= The Orville season 1 =

2017 season of an American television series

The Orville
- Season 1
- Promotional poster
- Starring: Seth MacFarlane; Adrianne Palicki; Penny Johnson Jerald; Scott Grimes; Peter Macon; Halston Sage; J Lee; Mark Jackson
- No. of episodes: 12

Release
- Original network: Fox
- Original release: September 10 – December 7, 2017

Season chronology
- Next → Season 2

The first season of the comedy-drama science fiction television series The Orville was broadcast on Fox from September 10 to December 7, 2017. The series was created and written by Seth MacFarlane, who stars as Captain Ed Mercer of the exploratory ship Orville. The series also stars Adrianne Palicki as Commander Kelly Grayson, Mercer's ex-wife and first officer. The Orville is set about 400 years in the future and follows the crew of the titular spaceship who face the dangers and wonders of outer space, while dealing with the familiar problems of everyday life.

== Summary ==
Storylines include Ed and Kelly repairing their relationship, Alara facing challenges as a Union officer, Bortus questioning his people's culture following the birth of his child and the crew's conflict with a hostile alien species, the Krill.

== Cast ==
=== Main ===
- Seth MacFarlane as Captain Ed Mercer, who commands the Orville. Mercer was an up-and-coming officer, on the fast track to commanding his own heavy cruiser. Following the end of his marriage to his wife Kelly due to her adultery, he is cited for being lax in performance of his duties and for being hung over on the job. Due to Kelly's intervention, however, he is allowed to remain on active duty by taking over as captain of the research and science ship Orville.
- Adrianne Palicki as Commander Kelly Grayson, first officer of the Orville and Ed Mercer's ex-wife. She persuades Union higher-ups to give her ex-husband a new command, on the sole condition that she is appointed as his second-in-command.
- Penny Johnson Jerald as Dr. Claire Finn, chief medical officer on the Orville, holding the rank of lieutenant commander. She has expertise in molecular surgery, DNA engineering, and psychiatry. Despite having the credentials to serve on more prestigious ships, she chooses a posting on the Orville as she prefers to be "where the action is".
- Scott Grimes as Lieutenant Gordon Malloy, the helmsman of the Orville and Mercer's best friend. Considered the best helmsman in the fleet, he was relegated to desk duty after he attempted to impress a girl with a precarious shuttle docking maneuver, damaging the vessel and losing cargo in the process. Mercer subsequently requests him when the Orville needs a new helmsman.
- Peter Macon as Lieutenant Commander Bortus, the tactical officer aboard the Orville and third in command after Mercer and Grayson. Bortus is from Moclus, a planet dominated by weapons manufacturing, and whose society is all male. He is noted for his strong sense of duty, disciplined demeanor, and open-mindedness when interacting with his comrades aboard the ship.
- Halston Sage as Lieutenant Alara Kitan, a Xelayan female who serves as security chief, communications officer, and fourth in command of the Orville. Despite her small stature, Alara possesses superhuman physical strength and resiliency. She is eager to prove herself after enlisting in the Union fleet against her parents' wishes.
- J Lee as Lieutenant (later Lieutenant Commander) John LaMarr, Gordon's partner-in-crime and navigation officer of the Orville.
- Mark Jackson as Isaac, a Kaylon recruited by the Union to serve as science officer of the Orville for diplomatic purposes. He is the only artificial life-form on the ship's crew.

=== Recurring ===
- Victor Garber as Admiral Tom Halsey
- Chad L. Coleman as Klyden
- Larry Joe Campbell as Lieutenant Commander Steve Newton, Chief Engineer
- Norm Macdonald as the voice of Lt. Yaphit
- Rachael MacFarlane as the voice of Orville Computer
- BJ Tanner as Marcus Finn
- Kai Wener as Ty Finn
- Mike Henry as Dann
- Kelly Hu as Admiral Ozawa
- Ron Canada as Admiral Tucker

=== Guest ===
- Rob Lowe as Darulio
- Brian George as Dr. Aronov
- Joel Swetow as Krill captain
- Jeffrey Tambor as Ben Mercer
- Holland Taylor as Jeannie Mercer
- DeObia Oparei as Captain Vorak
- Rena Owen as Heveena
- David Barrera as Vasquez
- Liam Neeson as Jahavus Dorahl (uncredited)
- Robert Knepper as Hamelac
- Max Burkholder as Tomlin
- James Morrison as Kemka
- Charlize Theron as Pria Levesque
- Michaela McManus as Teleya/Lt. Janel Tyler
- Giorgia Whigham as Lysella
- Steven Culp as Wiliks
- Brian Thompson as Drogen
- Robert Picardo as Ildis Kitan
- Molly Hagan as Drenala Kitan
- Lenny Von Dohlen as Valondis

== Development ==
The Orville was written by Seth MacFarlane as a spec script. Fox ordered thirteen episodes for the first season, but only twelve were broadcast due to a gap in broadcast dates caused by the broadcaster's lengthy Christmas programming. The leftover episode, "Primal Urges", aired during season 2, which was ordered by Fox on November 2, 2017.

== Episodes ==
The Orville's season 1 episodes
No. overall	No. in season	Title	Directed by	Written by	Original release date	Prod. code	U.S. viewers (millions)
1	1	"Old Wounds"	Jon Favreau	Seth MacFarlane	September 10, 2017	1LAB01	8.56
Twenty-fifth-century Union command officer Ed Mercer divorces his wife, Kelly Grayson, after catching her cheating on him, prompting an emotional and mental crisis that ruins his chance of receiving a high-level command. A year later, he is appointed by the sympathetic Admiral Halsey to command U.S.S. Orville, a mid-level exploratory vessel. To his dismay, his ex-wife has been assigned as his first officer. During the Orville's first mission, the hostile alien Krill captain (Joel Swetow) raids a Union lab to steal a device that accelerates time, which has both beneficial and dangerous applications. Mercer and Grayson rig the device to destroy itself and the Krill vessel.
2	2	"Command Performance"	Robert Duncan McNeill	Seth MacFarlane	September 17, 2017	1LAB03	6.63
The technologically advanced Calivon capture and imprison Mercer and Grayson for a new exhibit in a zoo filled with humanoid species from throughout the galaxy. Alara is left in command of the Orville, as Bortus has laid an egg and must incubate it. Alara is unsure of herself but gains confidence with Claire's mentoring. Mercer and Grayson speculate whether they could have made their relationship work, but conclude they were incompatible for a long-term romantic relationship, despite their strong camaraderie. Admiral Tucker orders Alara to return the Orville to Earth rather than risk angering the powerful Calivon in a rescue attempt; Alara disobeys orders and retrieves Mercer and Grayson, along with a kidnapped alien child, by trading an archive of Earth's 21st-century reality television for them. Mercer honors Alara with a commendation, and he and Grayson are certain she will not be disciplined for disobeying a direct order. A rare female offspring hatches from Bortus's egg, stunning him and Klyden.
3	3	"About a Girl"	Brannon Braga	Seth MacFarlane	September 21, 2017	1LAB04	4.05
When Doctor Finn refuses Bortus and Klyden's request to perform sex reassignment surgery on their daughter, a standard Moclan practice on the rare occasion a female is born, they petition Mercer to order the procedure. Mercer refuses, as he (and the rest of the crew) object to performing such a procedure on a healthy infant. Bortus and Klyden arrange to have the procedure done on a Moclan vessel. Bortus changes his mind after watching Rudolph the Red-Nosed Reindeer; Klyden wants to proceed, revealing that he was born female. The case is arbitrated on Moclus, where Grayson represents Bortus; Grayson disputes male superiority by demonstrating Alara's immense physical strength and Gordon's lesser intelligence. Mercer locates Heveena, an elderly female Moclan who testifies about living a secluded but happy and fulfilling life. Under the male pseudonym "Gondus Elden," she became an esteemed author on Moclus. Klyden and the tribunal are unconvinced, and the infant undergoes the surgery. Despite their disagreement, Bortus and Klyden remain committed to giving their son, Topa, a good life.
4	4	"If the Stars Should Appear"	James L. Conway	Seth MacFarlane	September 28, 2017	1LAB02	3.70
The Orville encounters an immense, 2,000-year-old derelict ship drifting into a star. Mercer, Grayson, Kitan, Finn, and Isaac enter, discovering an artificial biosphere and a civilization of three million who worship an entity called Dorahl. They are unaware they are on a ship. Grayson is held prisoner by their theocratic dictator, Hamelac, who imposes a death penalty on "Reformers" who believe anything exists beyond their known world. While Bortus takes the Orville to save the colony ship DrieAnn from a Krill attack, Grayson's crewmates rescue her and lead a group of Reformers to the alien ship's bridge. An ancient video recording from Captain Jahavus Dorahl (Liam Neeson) reveals that it is a generation ship disabled by an ion storm. Isaac initiates repairs, and opens the hull's window, enabling the populace to see stars for the first time, moving even Hamelac. Mercer arranges for Union staff to train the inhabitants to operate their ship. Meanwhile, Klyden grows frustrated that Bortus's duties leave him little time for family.
5	5	"Pria"	Jonathan Frakes	Seth MacFarlane	October 5, 2017	1LAB05	3.43
The Orville rescues Captain Pria Levesque (Charlize Theron) from her imperiled mining ship. The beautiful Pria charms the crew and romances Mercer. Grayson grows suspicious of Pria and enlists Alara to investigate. They discover a mysterious device hidden in Pria's quarters; Pria then hijacks the Orville, navigating it out of a dark matter storm. She reveals her real identity as that of a time-traveling 29th-century artifact dealer, and her intention to use an artificial wormhole to take the ship back to her own time and sell it to a collector while leaving the crew stranded. Isaac transfers his consciousness to the ship's computer and regains control, enabling Malloy to return the Orville to its own time. Mercer seals the wormhole with the Orville's weapons, thereby erasing Pria from existence. Meanwhile, Malloy pranks Isaac by sticking Mr. Potato Head pieces on his head and encourages him to retaliate with his own practical joke, a concept unfamiliar to Isaac, who responds by cutting off Malloy's leg (which is subsequently quickly regrown).
6	6	"Krill"	Jon Cassar	David A. Goodman	October 12, 2017	1LAB06	3.37
After recovering an intact Krill shuttle, Mercer and Malloy are ordered to pose as Krill soldiers to board one of their vessels and obtain a copy of the Ankhana, a sacred religious text ("the Krill Bible" as it's described) via which the Krill believe by divine right they are superior to all other species in the universe. Mercer and Malloy are forced to change priorities after learning the Krill plan to detonate a powerful bomb over a remote Union colony. Rather than destroy the bomb, and therefore the ship, they exploit the Krill's natural weakness to sunlight to eliminate the crew while sparing a classroom of children and their teacher, a female Krill named Teleya. She warns Mercer that his actions will only reinforce the Krill's hatred for the Union.
7	7	"Majority Rule"	Tucker Gates	Seth MacFarlane	October 26, 2017	1LAB07	4.18
Grayson and an undercover team land on Sargas 4, a planet with a similar culture to 21st-century Earth. While searching for two missing anthropologists, they discover that Sargas 4 practices absolute democracy, where citizens decide everything by majority vote, even overturning factual information, replacing it with opinion. LaMarr, repeatedly ignoring Grayson’s orders to be inconspicuous, is arrested after making lewd movements on a historical statue, receiving more than a million "down" votes by viewers watching a televised clip. LaMarr must persuade the public to pardon him or else be subjected to "treatment". Meanwhile, Alara and Claire locate one missing anthropologist whose treatment was an irreversible lobotomy after being sentenced by public opinion over a minor incident. With LaMarr facing a final vote to determine his guilt, Mercer takes Lysella, a Sargas 4 inhabitant, aboard the Orville after she witnesses Alara's true appearance. She explains that the Master Feed works by the public watching film footage and then mass voting on it. Isaac hacks into the Master Feed and uploads heartwarming, fake, images of LaMarr. The vote narrowly passes in his favor, and the Orville team leaves. Lysella decides against taking part in a public vote, contemplating the Orville crew's advice about the difference between opinion and knowledge.
8	8	"Into the Fold"	Brannon Braga	Brannon Braga & Andre Bormanis	November 2, 2017	1LAB08	3.83
While traveling to a recreational planet in a shuttle, Isaac, Finn, and her sons, Marcus and Ty, fall into a spatial fold, and crash land on a planet a thousand light-years away from their original location. The planet, devastated by famine and disease, is populated by cannibals. During the landing, the shuttle breaks in half, separating Finn from the others. She is captured by a survivalist named Drogen. While she works to escape, Isaac, unfamiliar with the care of human children, is forced to protect Ty and Marcus while simultaneously attempting to repair the shuttle's communication systems and send a distress signal. Ty becomes ill with the planet's indigenous disease. After Finn kills Drogen and reunites with the others, Isaac and Marcus fend off a cannibal attack long enough for the Orville to rescue them. After Finn cures Ty's infection, Isaac tells her that, for all the children's faults, he still thinks of them fondly.
9	9	"Cupid's Dagger"	Jamie Babbit	Liz Heldens	November 9, 2017	1LAB09	3.69
The Orville is dispatched to mediate talks between the Navarians and the Bruidians, two alien species at a centuries-old stalemate over which race lays proper claim over the planet Lapovius. Also assigned to the matter is Darulio (Rob Lowe), the Retepsian whose affair with Grayson ended her marriage to Mercer. He will scan an ancient artifact from the planet for DNA to reveal which species was the original inhabitant. Unbeknownst to the crew, Darulio secretes a powerful sex pheromone during his mating cycle which affects the crew, resulting in trysts between Darulio and Grayson, Darulio and Mercer, and Finn and Yaphit. The affected officers are incapacitated, causing the Navarian and Bruidian delegates to cancel the mediation, and a full-scale battle in orbit around the planet ensues. To avert the crisis, Darulio and Alara expose the ambassadors to a modified version of the pheromone, causing a temporary mutual infatuation that prompts a ceasefire. DNA test results reveal that the planet's inhabitants were common ancestors to both species, legitimizing a mutual claim to the planet. When Grayson asks Darulio if he was in heat when they had their tryst, he says, "maybe".
10	10	"Firestorm"	Brannon Braga	Cherry Chevapravatdumrong	November 16, 2017	1LAB10	3.32
When Lt. Payne is trapped beneath debris during a plasma storm, Alara's pyrophobia causes her to hesitate, resulting in his death. Blaming herself, she tenders her resignation, which Mercer declines. He suggests she discover the source of her fear. Her parents (Robert Picardo and Molly Hagan) tell her that when she was an infant, her mother fell asleep while cradling her when a kitchen fire broke out. Alara's cries awoke her mother in time. Soon, the Orville encounters strange phenomena, including a scary clown, a giant spider that devours Malloy, and murderous versions of Finn and Isaac. It is revealed that Alara is in the holographic simulator. She ordered Isaac to create a program to simulate all her potential fears. Finn erased her short-term memory to ensure an authentic reaction to the program. Alara completes the program, but Mercer threatens to court martial her for invoking Directive 38 (allowing the chief of security to override the captain's clearance) to prevent anyone from prematurely aborting the simulation. He decides to be lenient, impressed by Alara's ability to overcome every obstacle.
11	11	"New Dimensions"	Kelly Cronin	Seth MacFarlane	November 30, 2017	1LAB11	3.63
With Lt. Newton leaving the Orville, Mercer must find a new chief engineer. Although Yaphit is next in line for the position, Cmdr. Grayson discovers that LaMarr has been concealing his intellectual gifts, stemming from his wanting to be accepted by his childhood peers while growing up. Grayson convinces Mercer to assign LaMarr to lead an engineering team assignment in order to evaluate him as a candidate. When Mercer learns that Grayson similarly advocated for Admiral Halsey to consider him for the Orville's captaincy, he becomes wracked with doubt and resentment. Grayson insists that he received the position on merit alone. Halsey confirms that Mercer's performance has borne this out. Meanwhile, the Orville encounters a thief with a cache of plasma rifles stolen from the Krill. He is killed when he passes into a region of two-dimensional space. To elude the Krill pursuers, the Orville takes refuge in that region. When the protective quantum bubble around the ship begins to fail, LaMarr rises to the occasion, and he and Yaphit help the ship escape the realm. LaMarr is made chief engineer and promoted to the rank of lieutenant commander.
12	12	"Mad Idolatry"	Brannon Braga	Seth MacFarlane	December 7, 2017	1LAB13	3.54
Grayson leads a shuttle team that crashes on a suddenly appearing planet with a Bronze Age society. After leaving, the crew discovers that the planet phases in to the universe for a short period every 11 days as 700 years passes on the planet. They discover that their first visit has resulted in a religion that worships Kelly Grayson and has since grown into a theocracy resembling Earth's middle ages. Admiral Ozawa reprimands Mercer for omitting mention of the contamination, and orders no further contact with the planet. Mercer and Grayson defy this order by returning to the planet to reveal the truth to the society's religious leader, but a subordinate assassinates him. By the planet's next appearance, its society is comparable to early-21st-century Earth, with religious bickering and strife. Resolving to end the suffering, Isaac stays on the planet when it phases out, spending 700 years with them. When the planet reemerges, it has progressed to interstellar space travel, and two of its representatives return Isaac to the Orville where they inform the crew that despite the tumultuous effect his arrival created, its society evolved away from worshiping Cmdr. Grayson. They suggest that as they progress over millennia ahead, they may study the Union (see "Mortality Paradox").

== Reception ==
=== Critical response ===
The first season of The Orville was met with a negative response from critics. On Rotten Tomatoes, the season has a 30% approval rating from critics, with an average rating of 5.2/10 based on 53 critic reviews. The website's critics consensus reads, "An odd jumble of campiness and sincerity, homage, and satire, The Orville never quite achieves liftoff." On Metacritic, which uses a weighted average, it has a score of 36 out of 100, based on 21 reviews, indicating "generally unfavorable" reviews.

=== Ratings ===
Viewership and ratings per episode of The Orville season 1
No.	Title	Air date	Rating/share (18–49)	Viewers (millions)	DVR (18–49)	DVR viewers (millions)	Total (18–49)	Total viewers (millions)
1	"Old Wounds"	September 10, 2017	2.7/9	8.56	—N/a	—N/a	—N/a	—N/a
2	"Command Performance"	September 17, 2017	2.2/8	6.63	0.9	2.42	3.1	9.05
3	"About a Girl"	September 21, 2017	1.1/4	4.05	—N/a	—N/a	—N/a	—N/a
4	"If the Stars Should Appear"	September 28, 2017	1.1/4	3.70	1.0	3.11	2.1	6.81
5	"Pria"	October 5, 2017	0.9/3	3.43	1.2	3.35	2.1	6.79
6	"Krill"	October 12, 2017	1.0/4	3.37	1.1	3.32	2.1	6.69
7	"Majority Rule"	October 26, 2017	1.2/5	4.18	1.1	3.11	2.3	7.29
8	"Into the Fold"	November 2, 2017	1.0/4	3.83	1.0	2.89	2.0	6.72
9	"Cupid's Dagger"	November 9, 2017	1.0/4	3.69	1.1	3.01	2.1	6.70
10	"Firestorm"	November 16, 2017	0.9/3	3.32	1.0	2.83	1.9	6.13
11	"New Dimensions"	November 30, 2017	0.9/3	3.63	1.0	2.86	1.9	6.49
12	"Mad Idolatry"	December 7, 2017	0.9/4	3.54	1.0	2.97	1.9	6.53

=== Awards and nominations ===
Award nominations for The Orville, season 1
Year	Award	Category	Nominee(s)	Result	Ref.
2018	International Film Music Critics Association Awards	Best Original Score for Television	Bruce Broughton, John Debney, Joel McNeely, Andrew Cottee	Won	
2018	Make-Up Artists & Hair Stylists Guild Awards	Best Special Make-Up Effects – Television and New Media Series	Howard Berger, Tami Lane, Garrett Immel	Nominated	
2018	ICG Publicists Awards	Maxwell Weinberg Publicist Showmanship Television Award	Erin Moody	Nominated	
2018	Saturn Awards (44th)	Best Science Fiction Television Series	The Orville	Won	
2018	Saturn Awards (44th)	Best Actor on Television	Seth MacFarlane	Nominated	
2018	Saturn Awards (44th)	Best Actress on Television	Adrianne Palicki	Nominated	

== Home media release ==
The season was released on DVD on December 11, 2018.

== Music ==
The soundtrack album for season 1 was released by La-La Land Records on January 22, 2019.

Disc 1
No.	Title	Music	Episode	Length
1.	"The Orville Main Title"	Bruce Broughton		1:04
2.	"Shuttle to the Ship"	Bruce Broughton	Old Wounds (1LAB01)	1:54
3.	"She Requested It / Departing for Landing"	Bruce Broughton	Old Wounds (1LAB01)	1:09
4.	"Krill Attack / Shuttle Escape"	Bruce Broughton	Old Wounds (1LAB01)	4:14
5.	"Emergency Docking"	Bruce Broughton	Old Wounds (1LAB01)	2:27
6.	"Kelly Has a Plan / Asking Kelly to Stay"	Bruce Broughton	Old Wounds (1LAB01)	3:51
7.	"The Bio-Ship / Exploring the Hull"	Joel McNeely	If the Stars Should Appear (1LAB02)	2:22
8.	"Exploring the Bio-Ship"	Joel McNeely	If the Stars Should Appear (1LAB02)	2:45
9.	"Finding Alara / Space Battle"	Joel McNeely	If the Stars Should Appear (1LAB02)	2:53
10.	"Dorahl / The Roof Opens"	Joel McNeely	If the Stars Should Appear (1LAB02)	4:05
11.	"Distress Signal Received / Alara Freaks Out / Explosion"	John Debney	Command Performance (1LAB03)	5:54
12.	"Alara Gets the Cold Shoulder / Approaching Calivon"	John Debney	Command Performance (1LAB03)	3:52
13.	"Extermination Process Continues / Bortus Hatches His Egg"	John Debney	Command Performance (1LAB03)	2:39
14.	"Western Simulation"	Joel McNeely	About a Girl (1LAB04)	1:01
15.	"Asteroid Destroyed / Relieved of Duty"	Joel McNeely	About a Girl (1LAB04)	1:07
16.	"Arriving on Moclus"	Joel McNeely	About a Girl (1LAB04)	1:42
17.	"Trip to the Mountains"	Joel McNeely	About a Girl (1LAB04)	2:15
18.	"Tribunal Adjourned / Epilogue"	Joel McNeely	About a Girl (1LAB04)	3:27
19.	"Rescuing Pria"	John Debney	Pria (1LAB05)	3:51
20.	"Searching Pria's Room / Dark Matter Storm / Navigating the Storm"	John Debney	Pria (1LAB05)	4:06
21.	"Approaching the Coordinates / Isaac Saves the Crew"	John Debney	Pria (1LAB05)	3:19
22.	"Pria's Theme"	John Debney	Pria (1LAB05)	1:41
23.	"Distress Call"	Joel McNeely	Krill (1LAB06)	1:29
24.	"Krill Attack the Orville"	Joel McNeely	Krill (1LAB06)	2:49
25.	"Bomb Found"	Joel McNeely	Krill (1LAB06)	4:54
26.	"Intruder Alert / Preparing the Weapon"	Joel McNeely	Krill (1LAB06)	2:59
27.	"Turning on the Lights / New Enemies"	Joel McNeely	Krill (1LAB06)	2:29
Total length:				76:59

Disc 2
No.	Title	Music	Episode	Length
1.	"Lysella Wakes Up / Looks Like Earth / Rescue Mission"	John Debney	Majority Rule (1LAB07)	1:39
2.	"John Gets Arrested / Alara Seems Suspicious"	John Debney	Majority Rule (1LAB07)	2:05
3.	"Ed Has a Plan"	John Debney	Majority Rule (1LAB07)	1:33
4.	"Bringing Lysella Aboard / Casting the Votes / Their World Can Do Better"	John Debney	Majority Rule (1LAB07)	6:06
5.	"Sucked In"	Joel McNeely	Into the Fold (1LAB08)	2:44
6.	"Claire Breaks Out"	Joel McNeely	Into the Fold (1LAB08)	1:26
7.	"The Fight"	Joel McNeely	Into the Fold (1LAB08)	1:21
8.	"Claire Returns to the Wreck"	Joel McNeely	Into the Fold (1LAB08)	2:11
9.	"The Attack"	Joel McNeely	Into the Fold (1LAB08)	1:55
10.	"Claire Thanks Isaac"	Joel McNeely	Into the Fold (1LAB08)	1:21
11.	"Archaeologist Arrives / Claire Visits Yaphit / Claire Kisses Yaphit"	John Debney	Cupid's Dagger (1LAB09)	3:12
12.	"Fleets Approach / War Before Peace / Cleared for Duty / Darulio Departs"	John Debney	Cupid's Dagger (1LAB09)	4:38
13.	"Plasma Storm / It Was Late Evening"	John Debney	Firestorm (1LAB10)	3:08
14.	"Alara Blows off Steam / There Was a Clown"	John Debney	Firestorm (1LAB10)	3:04
15.	"Alara Hallucinates / Deserted Ship"	John Debney	Firestorm (1LAB10)	6:55
16.	"Cannot End Simulation / Back to Normal"	John Debney	Firestorm (1LAB10)	4:03
17.	"Damage Report / What Happened to the Plants?"	Andrew Cottee	New Dimensions (1LAB11)	2:00
18.	"Krill Ships Approaching"	Andrew Cottee	New Dimensions (1LAB11)	2:30
19.	"Within the Anomaly / Time to Reflect / Quantum Bubble Is Deteriorating"	Andrew Cottee	New Dimensions (1LAB11)	2:25
20.	"Engaging Tractor Beam"	Andrew Cottee	New Dimensions (1LAB11)	2:17
21.	"Mission Complete / Commander Lamarr"	Andrew Cottee	New Dimensions (1LAB11)	2:48
22.	"Investigating an Anomaly"	Joel McNeely	Mad Idolatry (1LAB13)	1:09
23.	"Emergency Landing"	Joel McNeely	Mad Idolatry (1LAB13)	3:41
24.	"Searching the Planet"	Joel McNeely	Mad Idolatry (1LAB13)	2:38
25.	"Walking Through Town"	Joel McNeely	Mad Idolatry (1LAB13)	2:21
26.	"Spread the Word"	Joel McNeely	Mad Idolatry (1LAB13)	1:17
27.	"Isaac Steps Up / Civilization Restored"	Joel McNeely	Mad Idolatry (1LAB13)	3:14
28.	"The Orville End Titles"	Bruce Broughton		0:34
Total length:				74:58
