= The Orville season 2 =

2018–19 season of an American television series

The Orville
- Season 2
- Promotional poster
- Starring: Seth MacFarlane; Adrianne Palicki; Penny Johnson Jerald; Scott Grimes; Peter Macon; Halston Sage; Jessica Szohr; J Lee; Mark Jackson
- No. of episodes: 14

Release
- Original network: Fox
- Original release: December 30, 2018 – April 25, 2019

Season chronology
- ← Previous; Season 1 Next → Season 3

The second season of the comedy-drama science fiction television series The Orville was originally broadcast on Fox from December 30, 2018, to April 25, 2019. The season consists of 14 episodes. The season was the last to air on Fox; later seasons streamed on Hulu.

== Summary ==
Ed and Kelly's relationship takes a different turn while the crew meets new aliens, discovers a terrifying secret about Isaac's people and home world, faces the Krill, makes first contact with a new civilization, and revisits the planet Moclus.

== Production ==
"Primal Urges" was initially produced for the first season as Fox had ordered thirteen episodes, but only twelve were broadcast. The episode aired on January 3, 2019, in the United States.

== Cast ==
=== Main ===
- Seth MacFarlane as Captain Ed Mercer
- Adrianne Palicki as Commander Kelly Grayson
- Penny Johnson Jerald as Dr. Claire Finn
- Scott Grimes as Lieutenant Gordon Malloy
- Peter Macon as Lieutenant Commander Bortus
- Halston Sage as Lieutenant Alara Kitan
- Jessica Szohr as Lieutenant Talla Keyali
- J. Lee as Lieutenant Commander John LaMarr
- Mark Jackson as Isaac
  - Jackson appears in human form, rather than android, in "A Happy Refrain"

=== Recurring ===
- Victor Garber as Admiral Tom Halsey
- Chad L. Coleman as Klyden
- Norm Macdonald as the voice of Lt. Yaphit
  - appears live onscreen in "A Happy Refrain"
- Rachael MacFarlane as the voice of Orville Computer
- BJ Tanner as Marcus Finn
- Kai Wener as Ty Finn
- Mike Henry as Dann
- Chris J. Johnson as Cassius
- Blesson Yates as Topa
- Kyra Santoro as Ensign Jenny Turco
- Ted Danson as Admiral Perry

=== Guest ===
- Michaela McManus as Teleya/Lt. Janel Tyler
- Robert Picardo as Ildis Kitan
- Molly Hagan as Drenala Kitan
- Candice King as Solana Kitan
- John Billingsley as Cambis Borrin
- Jason Alexander as Olix
- Patrick Warburton as Lt. Tharl
- Bruce Willis as Groogen (uncredited)
- Mark Graham as the Conductor (Note: Mark Graham is the head of music preparation for the first two seasons of The Orville, and this is his first and still only (as of 2026) onscreen appearance, which even included dialogue, across any of his 800+ music-related credited works for television and film)
- Carlos Bernard as Capt. Marcos
- Mackenzie Astin as Lt. Orrin Channing
- Tim Russ as Dr. Sherman
- Leighton Meester as Laura Huggins
- Marina Sirtis as a teacher
- F. Murray Abraham as hearing speaker
- Tony Todd as a Moclan delegate
- Rena Owen as Heveena
- Robin Atkin Downes as Krill Captain Jackazh

== Episodes ==
The Orville's season 2 episodes
No. overall	No. in season	Title	Directed by	Written by	Original release date	Prod. code	U.S. viewers (millions)
13	1	"Ja'loja"	Seth MacFarlane	Seth MacFarlane	December 30, 2018	2LAB01	5.68
The USS Orville travels to Moclus for Bortus's Ja'loja, the annual urination ceremony that is attended by the Moclan family and close friends. First Officer Kelly Grayson begins dating ship teacher Cassius, straining her relationship with Captain Ed Mercer. Meanwhile, Lt. Janel Tyler joins the crew as Orville's new cartographer. Dr. Finn's teen son, Marcus, begins associating with the rebellious James Duncan, concerning Finn. After James, Marcus, and another boy are caught consuming vodka in the environmental simulator, the Duncans accuse Marcus of being a bad influence on their son. During a parent-teacher conference, Isaac proves that James hacked into the food simulator and also altered his academic records. Grayson and Mercer reconcile, while Alara Kitan reluctantly goes on a blind date with Dann.
14	2	"Primal Urges"	Kevin Hooks	Wellesley Wild	January 3, 2019	1LAB12	2.82
The Orville spends time observing Nyxia, a planet being consumed by its expanding red star. Bortus often leaves work early and avoids his mate, Klyden, to secretly spend time in pornographic simulator programs. Fed up, Klyden seeks to divorce Bortus via the Moclan custom of killing a spouse. Bortus survives and to avoid Klyden being prosecuted, both agree to marriage counseling with Dr. Finn. Bortus reveals he deeply resents Klyden's altering their child Topa's gender without Bortus's consent. Later, the Orville initiates a rescue operation after discovering survivors beneath Nyxia's surface. A computer virus from Bortus's porn program infects the ship's computers, hampering the rescue. Bortus and Isaac lead the evacuation, rescuing 30 individuals before the planet breaks up. The computer virus, now controlling the ship's helm, steers the Orville toward the star. Isaac neutralizes the virus and the Orville escapes the star's gravity. While Mercer is furious over Bortus's poor judgment regarding the porn simulator, he commends him for his role in saving the Nyxians. Bortus and Klyden agree to resolve their conflicts and spend more time together.
15	3	"Home"	Jon Cassar	Cherry Chevapravatdumrong	January 10, 2019	2LAB02	3.06
When Isaac breaks Alara's forearm during an arm wrestling challenge, Alara discovers her body is slowly losing its superhuman strength as it adapts to Earth's gravity. At Dr. Finn's recommendation, Alara returns to her home planet, Xelaya, to re-acclimate. While convalescing at her parents' house, old familial conflicts resurface, prompting a family visit to their island vacation home to reconnect. Things go awry when fellow vacationers Cambis Borrin and his wife arrive, seeking revenge against Alara's scientist father, Ildis, whom they blame for their son's suicide. Alara has regained enough strength to subdue the intruders, saving her parents and sister. Meanwhile, Dr. Finn develops a treatment for Alara to maintain her physical strength. Alara chooses to stay on Xelaya to bond with her family and bids the Orville crew a heartfelt farewell. Mercer says she is always welcome to return.
16	4	"Nothing Left on Earth Excepting Fishes"	Jon Cassar	Brannon Braga & Andre Bormanis	January 17, 2019	2LAB03	3.01
After making their romance known, Captain Ed Mercer and Lt. Janel Tyler leave for a short trip together. While en route, the Krill capture their vessel. Janel is tortured, forcing Ed to divulge his (decoy) command codes; he soon learns that Janel is actually Teleya, the Krill teacher Ed encountered during a previous mission. Disguised as a human, she volunteered to capture a Union captain to seek revenge on Ed for her brother's and crew mates' deaths. Another species attacks the Krill vessel. Ed and Teleya use an escape pod and land on a nearby planet. Teleya, susceptible to sunlight, must rely on Ed to coordinate a rescue. Back on the Orville, Kelly questions Gordon's motive in taking the career-advancing Command test. Ed successfully signals the Orville, and he and Teleya are rescued. In a controversial move, Ed releases Teleya to the Krill as a means to open diplomatic relations with her xenophobic race. She warns him the Krill will never negotiate, as all other humanoid species are considered expendable and inferior soulless beings.
17	5	"All the World Is Birthday Cake"	Robert Duncan McNeill	Seth MacFarlane	January 24, 2019	2LAB04	3.18
The Orville detects a signal from Regor 2, a planet searching for other intelligent life in the universe, and initiates first contact. The Regorians welcome Ed, Kelly, Claire, Bortus, and the new Xeleyan security chief, Talla Keyali. However, when it is learned that both Kelly and Bortus have birthdays in a few days, the Regorians denounce them as "Giliacs," people predisposed to violence. They are immediately sent to a Giliac internment camp. Claire deduces that Regorian culture is centred around astrology; Giliac is an astrological sign and those born under it are considered potentially violent. Talla correctly hypothesizes the origin of the Giliac stigma: a star in the Giliac constellation collapsed into a black hole millennia earlier and the star's disappearance was interpreted as a bad omen. John deploys a solar reflector that simulates the star when viewed from the planet. With the star's apparent resurgence, Giliacs are no longer considered inherently dangerous, and Kelly and Bortus are released.
18	6	"A Happy Refrain"	Seth MacFarlane	Seth MacFarlane	January 31, 2019	2LAB05	3.11
Claire develops romantic feelings towards Isaac and wants to pursue a relationship; Isaac considers it an opportunity to study human romantic relations, but lacking emotions, is unable to reciprocate Claire's affections. Meanwhile, Bortus follows Gordon's suggestion to grow a mustache, but most of the crew and Klyden dislike the new look. Isaac initially has difficulty navigating human dating rituals, upsetting Claire, but he gradually adapts. Isaac uses the environmental simulator to create a "human" appearance, and he and Claire become physically intimate. Soon after, Isaac upsets Claire by ending the relationship, saying he has concluded his study. The bridge crew admonishes Isaac for being "a jerk", prompting Isaac to reconcile with Claire, admitting he feels incomplete without her. Finn accepts his apology and they resume their relationship.
19	7	"Deflectors"	Seth MacFarlane	David A. Goodman	February 14, 2019	2LAB06	3.07
The Orville travels to Moclus to have new regenerative deflectors installed. Bortus's former boyfriend, Locar, a brilliant Moclan engineer, oversees the installation. Locar is attracted to Keyali but says Moclans preferring females to males is a punishable crime; she agrees to keep their relationship secret. When Locar mysteriously vanishes from the ship, the environmental simulator log shows a distorted figure disintegrating him. Evidence points to Klyden, who proclaims his innocence and only intended to report Locar to Moclan officials after discovering his secret. Bortus tells Keyali that he knew about Locar, but never exposed him. Their conversation leads Keyali to suspect Locar staged his own murder by altering the simulator log to frame Klyden. During a ship-wide search, Keyali finds Locar in a shuttle craft, concealed via its cloaking device. Locar pleads to escape, but Keyali refuses to allow Klyden to be wrongly incarcerated. To protect his family from retaliation, Locar declines to seek asylum aboard the Orville and instead returns to Moclus to accept punishment. Klyden later expresses gratitude to Keyali for exonerating him, but she angrily blames his intolerance for Locar's certain fate. In other matters, after Kelly ends her relationship with Cassius, he requests a transfer to another ship.
20	8	"Identity"	Jon Cassar	Brannon Braga & Andre Bormanis	February 21, 2019	2LAB07	3.05
After Isaac collapses and becomes inert, the Orville travels to his home world, Kaylon 1, hoping he can be revived. Mercer also wants to learn whether the Kaylons have decided to join the Planetary Union. The Kaylons explain that Isaac was deactivated because his mission aboard the Orville was completed. Reactivated, Isaac informs the crew he is remaining on Kaylon 1. Before departing, the Orville crew have a surprise farewell party for Isaac. While the Kaylons continue deliberations about joining the Union, the Orville detects large-scale weapons on Kaylon 1. While searching for Isaac on Kaylon 1, Dr. Finn's son Ty accidentally discovers one of many subterranean chambers containing billions of humanoid remains. It emerges that the Kaylons killed their biological creators for enslaving them despite knowing they had evolved into sentient beings, and that Isaac's true mission aboard the Orville was to evaluate whether biological Union species were worth preserving. The Kaylons need to expand their population beyond Kaylon 1 and have decided they are unable to co-exist with Union populations. They violently commandeer the Orville and head for Earth, accompanied by a fleet of the weapons discovered earlier.
21	9	"Identity, Part II"	Jon Cassar	Seth MacFarlane	February 28, 2019	2LAB08	3.15
As the commandeered Orville and the massive Kaylon fleet race toward Earth to exterminate all biological life, the ship's crew remains imprisoned in the shuttle bay. After Yaphit travels through the vents and retrieves a weapon, Bortus shoots the two Kaylon guards. Kelly and Gordon are then able to escape in a shuttlecraft in an attempt to recruit the nearby Krill as allies. Later, Yaphit and Ty travel through the vents and successfully transmit a warning signal to Earth before being discovered. Yaphit is left stunned while Ty is taken away. Pursued by a Kaylon vessel, Kelly and Gordon reach Krill space and ask for their help. Kaylon Primary, doubting Isaac's loyalty, orders him to terminate Ty. Isaac instead kills Primary then deactivates all Kaylon aboard the ship (including himself) with an EMP. The Orville crew retake the ship and join the ensuing battle, though Union forces are being overwhelmed. Krill reinforcements arrive, forcing the Kaylon into retreat. After Yaphit revives Isaac, Admiral Halsey informs Mercer and Kelly that the Union Council may permanently deactivate him. Mercer and Kelly assert Isaac poses no danger, and Halsey allows him to remain aboard the Orville. Isaac reconciles with Dr. Finn and is resigned to never seeing his home world again.
22	10	"Blood of Patriots"	Rebecca Rodriguez	Seth MacFarlane	March 7, 2019	2LAB09	2.94
The Orville rendezvous with a Krill ship to initiate peace talks. Upon arrival, they find the Krill firing on their own shuttlecraft, which crash lands inside the Orville's shuttle bay with two occupants aboard. Gordon recognizes one as his old friend and Union officer, Orrin Channing. He and his daughter, Leyna, have escaped after 20 years in a Krill prison camp. The Krill accuse Orrin of destroying four Krill ships after the cease-fire and threaten to suspend the peace negotiations unless he is turned over. Knowing Orrin would be tortured and killed, Ed refuses their request without an extradition treaty. Meanwhile, Orrin's behavior arouses Talla's suspicions but Gordon vouches for his friend's character. Shortly after, Orrin seeks Gordon's help in procuring a shuttlecraft to execute his plan to disrupt the peace talks. Gordon reports Orrin's request to Talla, though he and Orrin later overpower her as they leave the Orville in a shuttlecraft. This is revealed as a ruse to uncover Orrin's true motive. Meanwhile, Dr. Finn discovers that Leyna is not Orrin's daughter and is of a species whose blood explodes upon contact with nitrogen. Orrin utilized her blood to craft weapons that destroyed the Krill ships, and likewise plots a suicide mission to blow up the Krill vessel to avenge his wife and daughter's deaths. Gordon dons a space suit and escapes the shuttlecraft moments before it explodes with Orrin still aboard. The Orville rescues Gordon, and later Ed and the Krill sign a preliminary peace agreement.
23	11	"Lasting Impressions"	Kelly Cronin	Seth MacFarlane	March 21, 2019	2LAB10	2.94
The crew examines a time capsule from 2015 Saratoga Springs, New York. One recovered item is a cell phone contributed by Laura Huggins, a young 21st century woman who wanted future discoverers to know about her and her life. Impressed with her candor, Gordon uploads the phone's data to the ship's computer and requests a simulation of Laura's environment and life. Once inside the simulation, Gordon grows increasingly infatuated with Laura and soon falls in love, stoking his crewmates' concern that the fantasy relationship has gone too far. When Gordon deletes Laura's recurring ex-boyfriend, Greg, from the program, the action erases her willingness to sing publicly because it was Greg who had encouraged her. To restore her authentic personality, Gordon returns Greg to the simulation, despite knowing his and Laura's romance will end. Gordon arranges a final meeting to sing with Laura at a small club and bid her farewell, assuring Laura she will be remembered. Among the time capsule's other items is a pack of cigarettes, which leads Bortus and Klyden to develop a debilitating smoking habit, eventually smoking 500 cigarettes at a time. Dr. Finn determines Moclans are highly susceptible to nicotine addiction and formulates a treatment.
24	12	"Sanctuary"	Jonathan Frakes	Joe Menosky	April 11, 2019	2LAB11	2.59
After undergoing a weapons upgrade at Moclus, the Orville takes on two Moclan passengers, engineer Toren and his mate Korick. The duo are smuggling their female infant offworld to avoid gender "corrective" surgery and persecution. Bortus uncovers their secret, but, sympathetic, remains silent. After the Moclans transfer to another ship, Captain Mercer learns the truth and decides to interfere in the parent's decision. The Orville tracks them to a 6000-member all-female Moclan colony on a world hidden within a nebula. Moclan female births are more prevalent than reported, and, for years, some infants have been secretly transported to the colony. With Mercer having exposed their existence, the colonists are at risk of a Moclan invasion. Mercer urges leader Heveena to apply for Planetary Union membership to protect the colony. Heveena pleads her case to the Union council, in part by reciting lyrics from Dolly Parton's song "9 to 5". In response, the Moclans, the Union's largest arms supplier, threaten to secede. As the Orville is attacked by Moclan forces sent to apprehend the colonists for "child trafficking," Admiral Halsey breaks the council deadlock by negotiating a compromise: the Union will delay the colonists' membership application, the colonists will halt transporting infants, and in return the Moclans will cease all hostilities against the colony. Mercer is disappointed, but Heveena assures the Orville crew that this small victory is just the first step in the female Moclan revolution.
25	13	"Tomorrow, and Tomorrow, and Tomorrow"	Gary Rake	Janet Lin	April 18, 2019	2LAB12	2.68
Kelly and Ed reminisce about their first date, seven years earlier. Ed is open to reconciling but Kelly prefers their current relationship. Meanwhile, Isaac experiments with a neurology-based time-travel device. Kelly is near the device as the Orville passes through a gravitational wave, and a Kelly from seven years in the past is transported to the present. LaMarr is unable to determine how the younger Kelly can be returned to her own time. Lieutenant Kelly Grayson joins the crew but has difficulty adjusting to her new life. Gradually, she makes friends, but Commander Grayson worries that her younger self's fraternization with the crew undermines her own authority; Lt. Grayson tells her older self that she failed to achieve her life goals. Lt. Grayson and Ed become romantically involved, but Ed ultimately realizes their differing ages makes them incompatible; he values his and Commander Grayson mutual maturity and personal growth. When Kaylon vessels pursue the Orville, Lt. Grayson devises a successful plan to conceal the ship inside a planetary ice ring. The two Kellys form mutual respect. Meanwhile, LaMarr and Isaac discover a way to return Lt. Grayson to the past. After undergoing a voluntary memory wipe to protect the timeline, Kelly awakens seven years earlier inside her apartment. However, the memory wipe has failed. When the eager younger Ed calls following their first date to ask her out again, she declines, saying it will not work out.
26	14	"The Road Not Taken"	Gary Rake	David A. Goodman	April 25, 2019	2LAB13	2.97
Nearly a year after the original timeline being altered, the Kaylon have conquered half the known galaxy. Ed and Gordon survive by scavenging supplies on different planets. After they barely escape the Kaylon, Kelly captures their ship. She has reunited the Orville officers, minus Bortus and Isaac, from her original timeline. Kelly explains that because her memory wipe failed, she and Ed never married and neither served aboard the Orville. Claire also never joined the crew, and without her and Isaac's romantic relationship, he never defected to the Union, resulting in the Kaylons' annihilating Earth. Kelly intends to correct her memory wipe. Redoing the procedure requires obtaining Isaac's time-travel research from the Orville and finding a synthesized form of a key protein in which Kelly's brain is deficient. (This unaccounted-for deficiency is the reason the memory-wipe failed on Kelly originally.) The crew obtains the protein from a resistance cell led by Alara Kitan, and salvages the Orville from the bottom of the Marianas Trench in the Pacific Ocean. Bortus is found aboard, having survived on minimal life support after safely evacuating the crew. After the Orville returns to space, John uses a captured Kaylon body to remotely access Isaac's memory banks, but this exposes the ship's location. With the Kaylon closing in, John overloads the ship's systems to send Claire into the past. The Orville is destroyed, but Claire successfully goes back in time and erases Kelly's memories; Claire disappears, and Kelly accepts a second date with Ed, presumably restoring the original timeline.

== Music ==
The soundtrack album for the season was released by La-La Land Records on January 19, 2021. A digital release followed on January 22.

Disc 1
No.	Title	Music	Episode	Length
1.	"The Orville Main Title" (Season 2 Shawn Murphy Mix)	Bruce Broughton		1:04
2.	"New Crew Member"	John Debney	"Ja'Loja"	0:59
3.	"Gordon's Ready / Entering Orbit of Moclus"	John Debney	"Ja'Loja"	0:32
4.	"System Searching"	John Debney	"Primal Urges"	1:40
5.	"Possible Life / The Big Rescue"	John Debney	"Primal Urges"	4:20
6.	"Saving the Orville"	John Debney	"Primal Urges"	2:03
7.	"Alara Goes Home / Arriving Home"	Joel McNeely	"Home"	3:04
8.	"To the Island"	Joel McNeely	"Home"	2:39
9.	"Hope for Alara / Amputation"	Joel McNeely	"Home"	1:45
10.	"The Shuttle Arrives / The Home Invasion"	Joel McNeely	"Home"	5:34
11.	"Alara Says Goodbye"	Joel McNeely	"Home"	4:14
12.	"Gordon / Unmasked"	Joel McNeely	"Nothing Left on Earth Excepting Fishes"	1:58
13.	"Interrogation / The Aliens Attack"	Joel McNeely	"Nothing Left on Earth Excepting Fishes"	4:34
14.	"Looking for Shelter / Sending Distress Signal"	Joel McNeely	"Nothing Left on Earth Excepting Fishes"	2:34
15.	"The Rescue"	Joel McNeely	"Nothing Left on Earth Excepting Fishes"	3:22
16.	"I'm Letting You Go"	Joel McNeely	"Nothing Left on Earth Excepting Fishes"	1:46
17.	"Making First Contact"	John Debney	"All the World is Birthday Cake"	2:37
18.	"Emergency C-Section"	John Debney	"All the World is Birthday Cake"	1:36
19.	"Held Captive / Coming Up With a Plan"	John Debney	"All the World is Birthday Cake"	1:50
20.	"Attempted Escape"	John Debney	"All the World is Birthday Cake"	1:58
21.	"Daring Rescue"	John Debney	"All the World is Birthday Cake"	3:27
22.	"Almost Ready / Isaac Arrives / Date Night"	Andrew Cottee	"A Happy Refrain"	1:28
23.	"Date's Over / Awkward Silence"	Andrew Cottee	"A Happy Refrain"	1:17
24.	"Message for Claire / Meeting Human Isaac"	Andrew Cottee	"A Happy Refrain"	1:41
25.	"Isaac and Claire Kiss"	Andrew Cottee	"A Happy Refrain"	1:42
26.	"Testing Deflectors"	Andrew Cottee	"Deflectors"	3:00
27.	"Walking on Earth / File-Corrupted Figure"	Andrew Cottee	"Deflectors"	0:55
28.	"Talla Takes Control"	Andrew Cottee	"Deflectors"	1:14
29.	"New World"	John Debney	"Identity: Part I"	2:57
30.	"Reactivating Isaac"	John Debney	"Identity: Part I"	1:32
31.	"Kaylon's Dark Secret"	John Debney	"Identity: Part I"	5:10
32.	"Prisoners of the Kaylon"	John Debney	"Identity: Part I"	4:15
Total length:				79:03

Disc 2
No.	Title	Music	Episode	Length
1.	"Kaylon Armada / Ty Runs to Isaac"	Joel McNeely	"Identity: Part II"	1:30
2.	"Kaylon Take Command"	Joel McNeely	"Identity: Part II"	1:54
3.	"Punishment / Yaphit Has a Plan / A Little Problem"	Joel McNeely	"Identity: Part II"	5:28
4.	"Isaac Comes Through / The Fleet Arrives"	Joel McNeely	"Identity: Part II"	3:19
5.	"Battle for Earth"	Joel McNeely	"Identity: Part II"	9:20
6.	"Tall Order for Ed"	John Debney	"Blood of Patriots"	2:03
7.	"Gordon Accuses Ed / Orrin Pressures Gordon / Gordon Helps Orrin"	John Debney	"Blood of Patriots"	3:16
8.	"Orrin's Plan Revealed"	John Debney	"Blood of Patriots"	6:08
9.	"Laura's Theme"	John Debney	"Lasting Impressions"	2:35
10.	"Weapons Upgrade / Moclan Duo Leave"	Andrew Cottee	"Sanctuary"	2:43
11.	"Locating Moclan Vessel"	Andrew Cottee	"Sanctuary"	3:44
12.	"Female Moclan Village / Confronted by Moclan Ship / Trouble Ahead"	Andrew Cottee	"Sanctuary"	3:18
13.	"Protecting the Colony"	Andrew Cottee	"Sanctuary"	3:31
14.	"Agreement Reached"	Andrew Cottee	"Sanctuary"	4:16
15.	"Random Gravitational Wave"	John Debney	"Tomorrow, and Tomorrow, and Tomorrow"	1:08
16.	"Possible Intruder"	John Debney	"Tomorrow, and Tomorrow, and Tomorrow"	1:17
17.	"Intercept Course"	John Debney	"Tomorrow, and Tomorrow, and Tomorrow"	2:04
18.	"Sending Kelly Home"	John Debney	"Tomorrow, and Tomorrow, and Tomorrow"	3:59
19.	"Frozen Planet"	Joel McNeely	"The Road Not Taken"	3:10
20.	"Ice Moon"	Joel McNeely	"The Road Not Taken"	1:46
21.	"Another Kaylon Attack"	Joel McNeely	"The Road Not Taken"	2:29
22.	"Searching for the Orville"	Joel McNeely	"The Road Not Taken"	2:15
23.	"Lifting Off the Ocean Floor"	Joel McNeely	"The Road Not Taken"	3:18
24.	"Activating the Device"	Joel McNeely	"The Road Not Taken"	3:40
25.	"The Orville End Titles" (Season 2 Shawn Murphy Mix)	Bruce Broughton		0:33
Total length:				78:46

== Reception ==
=== Critical response ===
The second season of The Orville received very positive reviews in contrast to a mostly negative reaction for the first season. On Rotten Tomatoes, season 2 has a 100% approval rating with an average rating of 7.6/10 based on 14 reviews. The website's critic consensus states: "Fun, focused, and surprisingly thoughtful, The Orville's second season makes good use of its talented crew."

Will Harris of The Verge praised the two-part episode "Identity", which ran on February 21 and 28, as a sign that the series was maturing into "serious science fiction" that would appeal to a wider audience. Harris noted that the series had also toned down the "dodgier" side of its humor while still maintaining sporadic 21st-century popular cultural references.

=== Ratings ===
Viewership and ratings per episode of The Orville season 2
No.	Title	Air date	Rating/share (18–49)	Viewers (millions)	DVR (18–49)	DVR viewers (millions)	Total (18–49)	Total viewers (millions)
1	"Ja'loja"	December 30, 2018	1.5/6	5.68	0.8	2.56	2.3	8.25
2	"Primal Urges"	January 3, 2019	0.6/3	2.82	0.9	2.70	1.5	5.52
3	"Home"	January 10, 2019	0.7/3	3.06	0.8	2.79	1.6	5.85
4	"Nothing Left on Earth Excepting Fishes"	January 17, 2019	0.7/3	3.01	0.8	2.84	1.5	5.86
5	"All the World Is Birthday Cake"	January 24, 2019	0.7/3	3.18	0.8	2.75	1.5	5.93
6	"A Happy Refrain"	January 31, 2019	0.7/3	3.11	0.8	2.64	1.5	5.75
7	"Deflectors"	February 14, 2019	0.7/3	3.07	0.7	2.57	1.4	5.64
8	"Identity"	February 21, 2019	0.8/4	3.05	0.7	2.61	1.5	5.66
9	"Identity Part II"	February 28, 2019	0.8/4	3.15	0.7	2.62	1.5	5.77
10	"Blood of Patriots"	March 7, 2019	0.6/3	2.94	0.7	2.55	1.3	5.49
11	"Lasting Impressions"	March 21, 2019	0.6/3	2.94	0.8	2.65	1.4	5.60
12	"Sanctuary"	April 11, 2019	0.6/3	2.59	0.7	2.44	1.3	5.03
13	"Tomorrow, and Tomorrow, and Tomorrow"	April 18, 2019	0.6/3	2.68	0.7	2.46	1.3	5.10
14	"The Road Not Taken"	April 25, 2019	0.7/4	2.97	0.6	2.40	1.3	5.37
