= The Orville season 3 =

2022 season of an American television series

The Orville
- Season 3
- Starring: Seth MacFarlane; Adrianne Palicki; Penny Johnson Jerald; Scott Grimes; Peter Macon; Jessica Szohr; J Lee; Mark Jackson; Anne Winters
- No. of episodes: 10

Release
- Original network: Hulu
- Original release: June 2 – August 4, 2022

Season chronology
- ← Previous; Season 2

The third season of the comedy-drama science fiction television series The Orville, also known as The Orville: New Horizons, debuted on June 2, 2022, and concluded on August 4. It streams on Hulu in the United States and on Disney+ internationally. It consists of ten episodes, and one unproduced episode released as a novella by Seth MacFarlane. Filming began in October 2019 but was halted due to the COVID-19 pandemic, and production was ultimately completed in August 2021. The season streamed exclusively on Hulu, after its previous two seasons aired first on Fox, (Note: Episodes from seasons 1 and 2 were released on Hulu the day after each episode aired.) and is the only season to premiere since the acquisition of 21st Century Fox by Disney in March 2019.

== Summary ==
Storylines for the season include the Union's conflict with the Kaylon, Claire's reconciliation with Isaac, Ed discovering that he shares a daughter with newly elected Krill chancellor Teleya, the reversal of Topa's sex-change operation and new crew member Charly Burke overcoming her bigotry towards Isaac for his part in her friend's death upon learning the origins of the Kaylon's own prejudice towards biologicals. Towards the end of the season, Moclus is expelled from the Union after Kelly and Bortus rescue Topa from a Moclan black site where she's tortured and nearly killed after agreeing to help Haveena smuggle newborn Moclan females (violating the agreement established in the previous season), so the Moclans form an alliance with the Krill against the Kaylon, who are coerced into a truce with the Union by a weapon powerful enough to wipe them out. Ironically, the Union is forced to ally with the Kaylon when the weapon falls into the hands of the Krill and the Moclans, culminating in a battle that does not come without sacrifice.

== Cast ==
=== Main ===
- Seth MacFarlane as Captain Ed Mercer
- Adrianne Palicki as Commander Kelly Grayson
- Penny Johnson Jerald as Dr. Claire Finn
- Scott Grimes as Lieutenant Gordon Malloy
- Peter Macon as Lieutenant Commander Bortus
- Jessica Szohr as Lieutenant/Lieutenant Commander Talla Keyali
- J Lee as Lieutenant Commander John LaMarr
- Mark Jackson as Isaac
- Anne Winters as Ensign Charly Burke (Note: Winters is not credited in the final episode, "Future Unknown".)

=== Recurring ===
- Norm Macdonald as Lt. Yaphit (voice)
- Kai Wener as Ty Finn
- BJ Tanner as Marcus Finn
- Victor Garber as Admiral Tom Halsey
- Kelly Hu as Admiral Ozawa
- Andi Chapman as Admiral Howland
- Chad L. Coleman as Klyden
- Imani Pullum as Topa

=== Guest ===
- Mike Henry as Dann
- Alexis Knapp as Irillia
- James Read as Vice Admiral Paul Christie
- Elizabeth Gillies as Dinal
- Ted Danson as Admiral Perry
- Michaela McManus as Teleya
- Bruce Boxleitner as Union President Alcuzan
- Lisa Banes as Speria Balask
- Rena Owen as Heveena
- Leighton Meester as Laura Huggins
- Johnny Knoxville and Jack McBrayer as themselves
- Eliza Taylor as Doctor Villka
- Sophina Brown as Captain Losha
- Christopher Larkin as Timmis
- William R. Moses as Yan
- Scott Speiser as Verell
- Elyse Levesque as Wenda
- Dolly Parton as a simulation of herself
- Giorgia Whigham as Lysella
- Halston Sage as Alara Kitan

== Development and production ==
Fox renewed the series for a third season in May 2019. In July 2019, it was announced that the series would be moving to Hulu, targeting a premiere date in late 2020.

Seth MacFarlane and Jon Cassar were the only directors for the third season. Filming began in October 2019, but was halted in March 2020 due to the COVID-19 pandemic, by which time approximately half of the season had been completed. Production resumed in December 2020 but was suspended once again in January 2021 following a COVID surge. Filming once again resumed in early February 2021 and wrapped in August. Norm Macdonald completed voiceover work as Lt. Yaphit prior to his death in September 2021, making it his final role. The premiere was dedicated to his memory. The episode "Gently Falling Rain" was dedicated to Lisa Banes, who completed her role as Speria Balask prior to her death in June 2021.

The season introduced some changes to the show's production design, such as updated uniforms and sets, as well as Isaac and the Kaylon being redesigned to appear more robotic.

== Episodes ==
The Orville's season 3 episodes
No. overall	No. in season	Title	Directed by	Written by	Original release date	Prod. code
27	1	"Electric Sheep"	Seth MacFarlane	Seth MacFarlane	June 2, 2022	3LAB01
As the Orville is refitted and repaired following the battle against the Kaylon, most of the crew, including Marcus Finn, Gordon Malloy, and newly assigned Ensign Charly Burke, struggle with Isaac's presence on board. After significant conflict with the crew and Marcus saying he wishes Isaac was dead, Isaac commits suicide via EMP. While Claire and Ty are devastated by Isaac's death, Marcus gradually expresses remorse for his actions. John LaMarr discovers how to restore Isaac, but it requires Charly's special skills, which she initially refuses to provide. Marcus pleads for her help and she relents. A subplot involves the Orville escaping a pursuing Kaylon sphere by fleeing into a giant gas planet and destroying a shuttlecraft as a decoy. Note: The episode opens with a screen declaring "In Memory of Norm Macdonald 1959 – 2021". The episode marks MacDonald's first of six voice appearances of season three (with 22 appearances in the series).
28	2	"Shadow Realms"	Jon Cassar	Brannon Braga & Andre Bormanis	June 9, 2022	3LAB02
As the Orville crew undergoes diplomatic negotiations with the Krill to access a previously unknown region of space, Claire reunites with her ex-husband, Vice Admiral Paul Christie, who is also her former mentor and the chief diplomat assigned to their mission. Meanwhile, despite the Krill's warning, the crew undertakes an exploratory mission in the uncharted Kalarr Expanse supposedly inhabited by demons. During their exploration, the Orville encounters a gigantic and seemingly abandoned space station. While aboard the space station, Christie is infected by spores, mutating him into an alien creature that then infects several other crew members by altering their DNA. Claire and the crew force Christie and the other mutated crew to leave the ship by threatening to release a synthetic virus to which they lack immunity. Following the showdown, Claire and Isaac begin repairing their relationship.
29	3	"Mortality Paradox"	Jon Cassar	Cherry Chevapravatdumrong	June 16, 2022	3LAB03
After Talla returns from shore leave, a strange signal leads the crew to Narran 1, a world previously believed to be desolate and uninhabitable, only to find a vastly populated world with contemporary technology. Ed takes Kelly, Talla, Bortus, and Gordon to the surface to investigate where they find themselves caught in a series of increasingly strange and dangerous situations. Each has a brush with death, culminating in a scenario where the Orville is nearly destroyed by a Kaylon vessel. Lamarr, on Orville, is frantically searching for the landing party when Talla contacts him, revealing that the earlier "Talla" who returned to the ship is an imposter. The illusions were created by immortal beings from the multiphasic world the crew discovered two years ago ("Mad Idolatry"), their civilization having advanced 50,000 years since their last meeting. It is revealed that the immortal beings subjected the crew to the scenarios to help themselves understand mortality, as their society had begun to stagnate. Back onboard the ship, the crew discusses the implications of immortality.
30	4	"Gently Falling Rain"	Jon Cassar	Brannon Braga & Andre Bormanis	June 23, 2022	3LAB04
The crew escorts a Union delegation to the Krill homeworld to sign a historic treaty. Matters become complicated after Admiral Halsey tells Ed that Teleya is running for Supreme Chancellor and has amassed a populist following. The incumbent Chancellor is projected to win but Teleya stages a coup and seizes power, having the incumbent Chancellor killed. She plots to kill the Union delegates but secretly arranges Ed's release to reciprocate his freeing her the prior year ("Nothing Left on Earth Excepting Fishes"). However, Krills who support the Union-Krill alliance intercept Ed. They introduced him to Anaya, a half-human/half-Krill child who is his and Teleya's daughter. Ed confronts Teleya, who fearing losing her following and newfound power, refuses to reveal Anaya. She then returns Ed for execution. Before the delegates are executed, Lamarr and Claire, disguised as Krill, arrive and stage a rescue. The delegates are safely returned to Orville and escape to Earth. Though the treaty is now dead, Ed resolves to somehow preserve the peace between the Union and the Krill to protect his daughter, even though it is unlikely he will see her again. As the episode ends, Teleya watches Anaya playing over a security feed. Note: The episode opens with a screen declaring "In Memory of Lisa Banes 1955 – 2021". The episode marked the first of three appearances by Banes in the series.
31	5	"A Tale of Two Topas"	Seth MacFarlane	Seth MacFarlane	June 30, 2022	3LAB05
Kelly mentors Topa to help him prepare for the Union Point entrance exam. Topa confides in Kelly that he feels something is wrong with him. Kelly feels that Bortus and Klyden should tell Topa that he was born female. Klyden steadfastly refuses and forbids Topa to continue training with Kelly, which leads to Topa having suicidal thoughts. Both Kelly and Bortus's actions lead Topa to the truth of his origins. Topa wants to be female and asks Claire to reverse the gender reassignment surgery. Klyden protests and threatens to leave Bortus, but Bortus consents. However, the admiralty refuses to allow the surgery because it would cause Moclus to leave the Union, making them vulnerable to the Kaylon. Claire volunteers to resign so she can perform the procedure without causing an interstellar incident; Isaac instead volunteers to perform the procedure, as he is not officially a Union officer. To maintain plausible deniability, Ed orders Isaac not to perform it, then arranges a concert for the crew to give Isaac time for the procedure. Despite Klyden's attempt to stop the surgery, it is successful, and Topa is restored to female form. Klyden furiously renounces his ties with Bortus and Topa, but Bortus reaffirms his love for his daughter, and Kelly resumes mentoring her.
32	6	"Twice in a Lifetime"	Jon Cassar	Seth MacFarlane	July 7, 2022	3LAB06
Lamarr upgrades the Aronov device to send an entire ship back in time. The Union orders the device be transferred to a secure research facility. Upon arriving, Orville and its escorting convoy are attacked by the Kaylon. Gordon attempts to destroy the device but a core overload hits the device and accidentally transports him to 2015. The crew mount a rescue but arrive ten years later in the year 2025. Gordon has made a family with Laura, the real-life version of the woman he had a holographic relationship with ("Lasting Impressions"). Gordon insists on remaining in the past, defying Union law and Ed and Kelly's insistence. Meanwhile, Isaac and Charly search for dysonium for the ship's core. Isaac, disguised holographically as a human, attempts to bond with her but is rebuffed. Charly reveals the woman she loved was killed during the Kaylon attack on Earth, and she blames on Isaac. Gordon again refuses to return, so the crew use the dysonium to jump back to 2015, rescuing Gordon roughly a month after his arrival but erasing his time with Laura. The strain of the trip burns out the Aronov device, so the Orville utilizes time dilation to return to their time. Ed and Kelly tell Gordon the whole story. He sympathizes with their guilt, but assures them it was the right decision.
33	7	"From Unknown Graves"	Seth MacFarlane	David A. Goodman	July 14, 2022	3LAB07
In flashbacks, the downfall of the Kaylons' creators is depicted: after the Kaylons, originally docile robotic servants, begin disobeying orders, a software update gives them the ability to feel pain, which their masters widely abuse. The robots rebel. In the present, to convince the matriarchal Janisi to join the Union, Kelly and Talla pose as captain and first officer. Meanwhile, the crew rescues cyberneticist Dr. Villka and a peaceful Kaylon named Timmis from an abandoned planet. Villka and her late father rewired Timmis to give him a full suite of emotions. Timmis shows deep regret for the Kaylons' actions. Claire convinces Isaac to undergo the procedure; it is successful, but he soon reverts to his original state due to being a later generation Kaylon. Although he can be modified to make his emotions permanent, all his memories would be erased; while he agrees to do this for Claire, she wants to preserve who he is. The Janisi appear willing to join the Union, but when they exhibit misandry toward the male crew, Ed reveals the truth. The negotiations are threatened, but when Ed shows his continuing respect for Kelly despite her infidelity, the Janisi agree to consider diplomatic relations. Lamarr continually suffers traumatic injuries having sex with Talla. Though they initially resolve to make it work, his repeated injuries lead them to end their relationship. After Timmis tells Charly about the Kaylons' history of slavery, she realizes that she cannot judge an entire race as evil and expresses a greater openness toward working with Isaac.
34	8	"Midnight Blue"	Jon Cassar	Brannon Braga & Andre Bormanis	July 21, 2022	3LAB08
Topa accompanies Kelly and Bortus when they inspect the female Moclan colony. Haveena confides to Topa that she has resumed smuggling female children from Moclus, violating an agreement with the Moclan government. She secretly recruits Topa to her cause, entrusting her with sensitive information and a Moclan contact name. After a Moclan inspection team kidnaps Topa, Haveena admits to Ed that she recruited Topa and suspects the Moclans uncovered her involvement. In order for Ed to investigate the Moclans and search for Topa, Haveena must first testify before the Union council that she violated the agreement. Fearful for the colony, Haveena initially refuses but reconsiders after an encounter with a simulation of her idol, Dolly Parton. Meanwhile, Kelly and Bortus track down and rescue Topa from a secret Moclan outpost, where Bortus brutally beats and blinds Topa's captor after learning he tortured her for information. The three arrive at the Union council and convince them to investigate the Moclans' secret activities and treatment of female Moclans. The council votes to expel Moclus from the Union, and also to recognize the colony as sovereign, making it a protectorate. Klyden returns to the Orville and apologizes to Topa, accepting her as his daughter. Bortus and Klyden renounce their Moclan citizenship.
35	9	"Domino"	Jon Cassar	Brannon Braga & Andre Bormanis	July 28, 2022	3LAB10
After the Planetary Union expels them, the Moclans ally with the Krill. Meanwhile, Charly and Isaac invent a device capable of destroying the Kaylon fleet. The Union votes to use the weapon as leverage for an armistice with the Kaylon. However, Union Admiral Perry, convinced the Kaylon will develop a countermeasure, betrays the Union and takes the weapon to the Krill, believing they will use it to wipe out the Kaylon. Krill Chancellor Teleya destroys Perry's shuttle on its return to Earth to prevent his prematurely revealing the new Krill/Moclan alliance to the Union. The Orville crew discovers this and Bortus informs them that the weapon will likely be taken to the brilliant Moclan scientist, Dr. Kalba. Ed reckons the Krill/Moclan alliance will be a strong threat to the Union and hesitantly forms a temporary alliance with the Kaylon. A large-scale battle between the two alliances erupts, ending with Charly sacrificing herself to destroy the weapon. Her sacrifice impresses Kaylon Primary and he reassess Kaylon's hostilities towards biological life. Teleya is captured and taken to Earth to stand trial for war crimes. However, she refuses to hand Anaya over to Ed. The Kaylon are offered an alliance with the Union and possible future membership, terms they accept. The Orville crew holds a memorial service honoring Charly's sacrifice, with Isaac giving the eulogy.
36	10	"Future Unknown"	Seth MacFarlane	Seth MacFarlane	August 4, 2022	3LAB11
After Bortus and Klyden renew their vows, the Orville is sent to check on researchers on Sargas 4 (last seen in "Majority Rule"), only to be surprised by a message from Lysella, who requests asylum onboard the ship. Meanwhile, Bortus and Klyden's reunion propels Isaac to renew his commitment to Claire by proposing to her. After some deliberation, Claire accepts and the crew begins planning the wedding. Kelly attempts to help Lysella adjust to Union life but, after witnessing the technological advances and interpersonal relationships between various species, Lysella regrets leaving her society and asks to return. Before she can depart, however, Kelly and Talla discover that Lysella is attempting to smuggle a comscanner loaded with information on futuristic technology to change her world. Kelly shows her a simulation of a world the Union attempted to help in a similar fashion only for it to fall into ruin just a few years later, leading the Union to ban interfering in a planet's natural development. In light of this, Lysella decides to stay. The crew, along with the Kaylon fleet, gather for the wedding, with Kelly as the maid of honor and Bortus as the best man. Alara returns for the reception and Gordon gives a touching speech followed by performing a song as the Orville sails off into the stars.

=== Novella ===
The season was initially announced as consisting of eleven episodes, but one episode was not filmed due to pandemic-related travel restrictions. Titled "Sympathy for the Devil", it was instead adapted as a novelization written by MacFarlane, and takes place between "Midnight Blue" and "Domino". The audiobook is narrated by guest star Bruce Boxleitner. The novella was released on July 19, 2022.

Title	Author	Publication date	ISBN
The Orville: Sympathy for the Devil	Seth MacFarlane	July 19, 2022	978-1-368-09263-0
In 1914 New York City, a woman leaves her baby at the front desk of a hotel and never returns. The staff decide to give the baby to a German couple staying in the hotel, who name the baby Otto and return with him to Germany. As a teenager, Otto begins to sympathize with the Nazi Party and develops a strong disdain for Jews, and joins the Schutzstaffel. Otto later marries and fathers a son. Otto becomes the commander of a concentration camp, where he kills Jewish prisoners to entertain himself. Ed and Kelly arrive at the camp and end the program, revealing Otto’s reality to be a simulation, and take Otto to the Orville and his parents, who reveal his true name to be Adam. Adam’s parents recount that they were energy researchers living and working in a below-ground laboratory when the Krill attacked their laboratory to steal their research. Adam’s mother hid him in their 1914 simulation before the Krill abducted and imprisoned them, and Adam was left to be raised by the simulator for nearly thirty years. Adam has difficulty adjusting to reality, and the Orville crew unsuccessfully attempt to deprogram him. Adam escapes from his quarters and takes an officer hostage, whom he has take him to the ship’s simulator, where he has the computer create a simulation of his wife and son in a reality where Germany won World War II. Ed and Talla apprehend Adam and arrange for him to be sent to a facility for extensive psychological deprogramming. Decades later, an elderly Adam is working as a baker and runs into Ty Finn, and mentions Ty’s mother helped him during a difficult time.

== Music ==
A soundtrack album for this third season of The Orville was released digitally by Hollywood Records on March 3, 2023.

The Orville: New Horizons (Original Television Soundtrack)
No.	Title	Music	Episode	Length
1.	"The Orville: New Horizons Main Title"	Bruce Broughton		1:36
2.	"Battling the Kaylon"	Kevin Kaska	"Electric Sheep"	2:27
3.	"Gordon Flies In"	Kevin Kaska	"Electric Sheep"	2:27
4.	"Claire Visits Isaac/Training Exercises"	Kevin Kaska	"Electric Sheep"	3:57
5.	"Isaac Is Found/Ed's Speech"	Kevin Kaska	"Electric Sheep"	3:21
6.	"Leaving the Dockyard/Under Fire"	Kevin Kaska	"Electric Sheep"	7:37
7.	"Powering Isaac Up/All Is Well"	Kevin Kaska	"Electric Sheep"	3:00
8.	"Meeting Dismissed/Krill Depart"	John Debney	"Shadow Realms"	3:04
9.	"Searching the Alien Station"	John Debney	"Shadow Realms"	8:54
10.	"Treating the Admiral"	John Debney	"Shadow Realms"	3:02
11.	"Shipwide Blackout"	John Debney	"Shadow Realms"	4:20
12.	"Claire Searches/Kids Narrowly Escape/Crew Reunites"	John Debney	"Shadow Realms"	4:38
13.	"New Patient"	John Debney	"Shadow Realms"	4:10
14.	"Aliens Evacuate"	John Debney	"Shadow Realms"	7:00
15.	"Talla Arrives"	Joel McNeely	"Mortality Paradox"	1:18
16.	"Signs of Life"	Joel McNeely	"Mortality Paradox"	5:13
17.	"Entering the School/Searching the School"	Joel McNeely	"Mortality Paradox"	3:44
18.	"Near-Death Experience"	Joel McNeely	"Mortality Paradox"	4:48
19.	"More Near-Death Experience"	Joel McNeely	"Mortality Paradox"	8:04
20.	"Destroying the Generator"	Joel McNeely	"Mortality Paradox"	6:25
21.	"Battle with the Kaylon"	Joel McNeely	"Mortality Paradox"	5:10
22.	"Dinal Explains the Situation"	Joel McNeely	"Mortality Paradox"	3:53
23.	"Dalakos Arrival"	Joel McNeely	"Gently Falling Rain"	5:07
24.	"Emergency Arrival"	Joel McNeely	"Gently Falling Rain"	1:29
25.	"Slums of Dalakos"	Joel McNeely	"Gently Falling Rain"	8:11
26.	"Detention Facility"	Joel McNeely	"Gently Falling Rain"	1:48
27.	"Chase Through the City/Rescuing the Team"	Joel McNeely	"Gently Falling Rain"	3:57
28.	"Working Toward Peace"	Joel McNeely	"Gently Falling Rain"	1:03
29.	"Archeological Ruins/Inside the Ruins"	Andrew Cottee	"A Tale of Two Topas"	3:08
30.	"Searching the Database/Confronting Bortus"	Andrew Cottee	"A Tale of Two Topas"	1:24
31.	"Heveena's Speech"	Andrew Cottee	"A Tale of Two Topas"	2:40
32.	"Union Has Decided/All Mapped Out"	Andrew Cottee	"A Tale of Two Topas"	2:29
33.	"Official Orders"	Andrew Cottee	"A Tale of Two Topas"	2:27
34.	"Topa Wakes Up"	Joel McNeely	"A Tale of Two Topas"	1:46
35.	"Kelly Invites Topa"	Kevin Kaska	"A Tale of Two Topas"	2:57
36.	"Transporting the Aronov Device"	Andrew Cottee	"Twice in a Lifetime"	1:50
37.	"Kaylon Ambush"	Andrew Cottee	"Twice in a Lifetime"	4:05
38.	"Initiating Sequence/Landing on Earth"	Andrew Cottee	"Twice in a Lifetime"	5:46
39.	"Leave, Now!"	Joel McNeely	"Twice in a Lifetime"	3:38
40.	"Gordon Returns"	Andrew Cottee	"Twice in a Lifetime"	2:46
41.	"Returning Home"	Andrew Cottee	"Twice in a Lifetime"	4:35
42.	"Guests Arrive/Subterranean Outpost"	John Debney	"From Unknown Graves"	4:03
43.	"Kaylon Bonding/Murderous Past"	John Debney	"From Unknown Graves"	1:27
44.	"Common Ground"	John Debney	"From Unknown Graves"	5:29
45.	"Isaac's Proposal/Isaac and Charly"	John Debney	"From Unknown Graves"	3:10
46.	"Moclan Colony/Meeting Heveena"	Joel McNeely	"Midnight Blue"	3:31
47.	"Sweet Moment/Beautiful Sight"	Joel McNeely	"Midnight Blue"	4:30
48.	"Rushing Back"	Joel McNeely	"Midnight Blue"	4:06
49.	"Union Central"	Joel McNeely	"Midnight Blue"	2:58
50.	"Canyon Basin"	Joel McNeely	"Midnight Blue"	1:37
51.	"Entering the Black Site"	Joel McNeely	"Midnight Blue"	3:48
52.	"Saving Topa"	Joel McNeely	"Midnight Blue"	4:57
53.	"It's Decided"	Joel McNeely	"Midnight Blue"	1:25
54.	"Traumatic Experience"	Joel McNeely	"Midnight Blue"	2:00
55.	"Klyden Returns/Family Dinner"	Joel McNeely	"Midnight Blue"	3:55
56.	"Meeting with Teleya/Closing In"	Kevin Kaska	"Domino"	4:10
57.	"Tactical Alert"	John Debney	"Domino"	4:41
58.	"Accessing the Device/Delivering the Device"	Kevin Kaska	"Domino"	6:13
59.	"Seeking Answers"	Kevin Kaska	"Domino"	4:49
60.	"Temporary Alliance"	John Debney	"Domino"	1:57
61.	"Breaking In"	Kevin Kaska	"Domino"	20:11
62.	"Locked Up"	Kevin Kaska	"Domino"	3:41
63.	"New Beginnings"	Kevin Kaska & Joel McNeely	"Domino"	4:09
64.	"Flowers Never Bend with the Rainfall" (Performed by Scott Grimes & Anne Winters)	Paul Simon	"Domino"	1:32
65.	"Preparing to Land/Bonding Ceremony"	Joel McNeely	"Future Unknown"	3:34
66.	"Isaac Proposes/Call for Help"	Joel McNeely	"Future Unknown"	1:49
67.	"Hey, Boys/Marriage Approval"	Joel McNeely	"Future Unknown"	1:37
68.	"Asteroid Simulation"	Joel McNeely	"Future Unknown"	2:06
69.	"Teaching Lysella"	Joel McNeely	"Future Unknown"	5:26
70.	"Surprise Guests/Newly Married"	Joel McNeely	"Future Unknown"	1:47
71.	"Secret O'Life" (Performed by Scott Grimes)	James Taylor	"Future Unknown"	2:46
72.	"The Orville: New Horizons End Title"	Bruce Broughton		1:06
Total length:				4:37:00

== Reception ==
=== Viewership ===
According to Parrot Analytics, which looks at consumer engagement in consumer research, streaming, downloads, and on social media, The Orville: New Horizons was the fourth most in-demand streaming show in the United States during the week ending August 26, 2022. It later moved to sixth place during the week ending September 9, 2022. JustWatch, a guide to streaming content with access to data from more than 20 million users around the world, reported that The Orville was the sixth most-streamed show in the U.S. from May 30 to June 5, 2022. The streaming aggregator Reelgood, which tracks 20 million monthly viewing decisions across all streaming platforms in the U.S. for original and acquired streaming programs and movies across subscription video-on-demand (SVOD) and ad-supported video-on-demand (AVOD) services, revealed that The Orville was the fifth most-streamed series during the week of June 11, 2022. Whip Media, which tracks viewership data for the more than 25 million worldwide users of its TV Time app, announced that it was the fifth most-streamed original series in the U.S. and Hulu's second most-streamed series behind Only Murders in the Building from August 1–7, 2022.

=== Critical reception ===
On Rotten Tomatoes, the third season has an approval rating of 94%, with an average rating of 8.2/10 based on 14 reviews.

Den of Geek reviewer Michael Winn Johnson awarded the first episode "Electric Sheep" five out of five stars. He gave a favorable appraisal of the Isaac-centric storyline for dealing with the themes of prejudice and suicide. Johnson also praised MacFarlane and his creative team for forging an "extremely strong identity" for the show despite its influence from other science fiction franchises, particularly Star Trek. Remus Norona of Collider gave the first episode an A minus, stating that the season premiere is "bigger, bolder, and a whole lot darker." He noted that the first episode explored themes such as trauma, suicide, and grief.

Tell-Tale TV reviewer Nick Hogan observed that the third season had a higher budget than the previous two seasons, allowing more investment in both the practical and special effects. Hogan described the second episode "Shadow Realms" as a "cool, Alien-esque horror story that thrills both psychologically and physically" but criticised the "bloated" storyline. Reviewing the third episode "Mortality Paradox," Johnson praised the episode's writer Cherry Chevapravatdumrong for mixing the third season with "thrills, humor, adventure and even a little horror.

Digital Trends reviewer Michael Green praised the third season, describing it as a "loving homage" and the spiritual successor to Star Trek: The Next Generation. Green also praised the family dynamic between the main cast members' characters Seth MacFarlane (Captain Ed Mercer), Adrianne Palicki (Commander Kelly Grayson), Penny Johnson Jerald (Dr Claire Finn), Mark Jackson (Isaac), Peter Macon (Bortus) and J. Lee (Chief Engineer John LaMarr). Green further praised The Orville's high production values and gave a favorable appraisal of its stories which explored philosophical, intellectual and human interest issues. Green praised the Season 3 episode "Midnight Blue" for exploring the ethical dimensions of gender reassignment surgery and its cameo featuring Dolly Parton. He also gave a favorable appraisal of the time travel episode "Twice in a Lifetime" which explored tampering with the past and sacrificing one's family for the "greater good."
