= Seven Stages to Achieve Eternal Bliss =

- Theatrical release poster
- Directed by: Vivieno Caldinelli
- Written by: Christopher Hewitson; Justin Jones; Clayton Hewitson
- Produced by: Daniel Noah; Josh C. Waller; Lisa Whalen; Elijah Wood
- Starring: Kate Micucci; Sam Huntington; Dan Harmon; Mark McKinney; Rhea Seehorn; Dana Gould; Maria Bamford; Brian Posehn; Lilan Bowden; Jon Dore; Josh Brener; Mindy Sterling; J. Lee; Brian Girard; Michael St. Michaels; Taika Waititi
- Cinematography: Mathew Rudenberg
- Edited by: Matt Latham
- Music by: Joe Wong
- Production companies: MarVista Entertainment; Company X SpectreVision; Tamperclean Films
- Distributed by: MarVista Entertainment
- Release dates: April 20, 2018 (Tribeca Film Festival); March 6, 2020 (United States)
- Running time: 88 minutes
- Country: United States
- Language: English

Seven Stages to Achieve Eternal Bliss is a 2018 American black comedy film directed by Vivieno Caldinelli and written by Christopher Hewitson, Justin Jones and Clayton Hewitson. The film stars Kate Micucci, Sam Huntington, Dan Harmon, Mark McKinney, Rhea Seehorn, Dana Gould, Maria Bamford, Brian Posehn, Lilan Bowden, Jon Dore, Josh Brener, Mindy Sterling, J. Lee, Brian Girard, Michael St. Michaels and Taika Waititi. The film was released on March 6, 2020, by MarVista Entertainment.

== Cast ==
- Kate Micucci as Claire
- Sam Huntington as Paul
- Dan Harmon as Cartwright
- Mark McKinney as Cultist
- Rhea Seehorn as Nordheim
- Dana Gould as Pearl
- Maria Bamford as Cultist
- Brian Posehn as Cultist
- Lilan Bowden as Anthea
- Jon Dore as Tony
- Josh Brener as Cultist
- Mindy Sterling as Beatrice
- J. Lee as Stone
- Brian Girard as Wallace
- Michael St. Michaels as Cultist
- Taika Waititi as Storsh
- Matt Jones as Phil
- Ryan Simpkins as Cultist
- Britney Young as Cultist
- Craig Cackowski as Golfer
- Ron Lynch as Cultist
- John Yuan as Cultist
- Matt Yuan as Cultist
- Lola Kelly as Cultist
- Adam Brodie as Cultist
- Robert Evans as Armund Nordheim
- John J. Lozada as The Mascot

== Release ==
The film premiered at the Tribeca Film Festival on April 20, 2018. The film was released on March 6, 2020, by MarVista Entertainment.
