= Saturn Award for Best Science Fiction Television Series =

Annual award

- Awarded for: Best television series of the year in the science fiction genre
- Country: United States
- Presented by: Academy of Science Fiction, Fantasy and Horror Films
- First award: 2016
- Currently held by: Andor (2024/2025)
- Website: www.saturnawards.org

The Saturn Award for Best Science Fiction Television Series is one of the annual awards given by the Academy of Science Fiction, Fantasy and Horror Films. The Saturn Awards, which are the oldest film and series-specialized awards to reward science fiction, fantasy, and horror achievements, included the category for the first time at the 42nd Saturn Awards ceremony, when the Saturn Award went through major changes in their television categories. It specifically rewards science fiction on television. At the 50th Anniversary Saturn Awards, the category was split to recognize both network/cable series and streaming series however, the categories were merged again at the subsequent 51st Saturn Awards.

== Winners and nominees ==
The winners are listed in bold.

(NOTE: Year refers to year of eligibility, the actual ceremonies are held the following year)

=== 2010s ===
Year	TV Series	Network
2015 **(42nd)**	**Continuum**	**Syfy**
2015 **(42nd)**	Colony	USA Network
2015 **(42nd)**	Doctor Who	BBC America
2015 **(42nd)**	The Expanse	Syfy
2015 **(42nd)**	The 100	The CW
2015 **(42nd)**	Wayward Pines	Fox
2015 **(42nd)**	The X-Files	Fox
2016 **(43rd)**	**Westworld**	**HBO**
2016 **(43rd)**	Colony	USA Network
2016 **(43rd)**	The Expanse	Syfy
2016 **(43rd)**	Falling Water	USA Network
2016 **(43rd)**	Incorporated	Syfy
2016 **(43rd)**	The 100	The CW
2016 **(43rd)**	Timeless	NBC
2017 **(44th)**	**The Orville**	**Fox**
2017 **(44th)**	Colony	USA Network
2017 **(44th)**	Doctor Who	BBC America
2017 **(44th)**	The Expanse	Syfy
2017 **(44th)**	The 100	The CW
2017 **(44th)**	Salvation	CBS
2017 **(44th)**	The X-Files	Fox
2018/2019 **(45th)**	**Westworld**	**HBO**
2018/2019 **(45th)**	Counterpart	Starz
2018/2019 **(45th)**	Doctor Who	BBC America
2018/2019 **(45th)**	Krypton	Syfy
2018/2019 **(45th)**	Manifest	NBC
2018/2019 **(45th)**	The 100	The CW
2018/2019 **(45th)**	The Orville	Fox
2018/2019 **(45th)**	Roswell, New Mexico	The CW
2019/2020 **(46th)**	**Star Trek: Discovery**	**CBS All Access**
2019/2020 **(46th)**	Doctor Who	BBC America
2019/2020 **(46th)**	Lost in Space	Netflix
2019/2020 **(46th)**	Pandora	The CW
2019/2020 **(46th)**	Raised by Wolves	HBO Max
2019/2020 **(46th)**	Star Trek: Picard	CBS All Access
2019/2020 **(46th)**	Westworld	HBO

=== 2020s ===
Year	TV Series	Network
2021/2022 **(50th)**	Network / Cable	
2021/2022 **(50th)**	**Superman & Lois**	**The CW**
2021/2022 **(50th)**	The Flash	The CW
2021/2022 **(50th)**	The Man Who Fell to Earth	Showtime
2021/2022 **(50th)**	Resident Alien	Syfy
2021/2022 **(50th)**	Supergirl	The CW
2021/2022 **(50th)**	Westworld	HBO
2021/2022 **(50th)**	Streaming	
2021/2022 **(50th)**	**Star Trek: Strange New Worlds**	**Paramount+**
2021/2022 **(50th)**	The Expanse	Amazon Prime Video
2021/2022 **(50th)**	For All Mankind	Apple TV+
2021/2022 **(50th)**	Lost in Space	Netflix
2021/2022 **(50th)**	The Mandalorian	Disney+
2021/2022 **(50th)**	The Orville: New Horizons	Hulu
2021/2022 **(50th)**	Star Trek: Discovery	Paramount+
2022/2023 **(51st)**	**Star Trek: Picard**	**Paramount+**
2022/2023 **(51st)**	Andor	Disney+
2022/2023 **(51st)**	Foundation	Apple TV+
2022/2023 **(51st)**	The Mandalorian	Disney+
2022/2023 **(51st)**	The Peripheral	Amazon Prime Video
2022/2023 **(51st)**	Silo	Apple TV+
2022/2023 **(51st)**	Star Trek: Strange New Worlds	Paramount+
2023/2024 **(52nd)**	**Fallout**	**Amazon Prime Video**
2023/2024 **(52nd)**	3 Body Problem	Netflix
2023/2024 **(52nd)**	Ahsoka	Disney+
2023/2024 **(52nd)**	The Ark	Syfy
2023/2024 **(52nd)**	Dark Matter	Apple TV+
2023/2024 **(52nd)**	Star Trek: Discovery	Paramount+
2024/2025 **(53rd)**	**Andor**	**Disney+**
2024/2025 **(53rd)**	The Ark	Syfy
2024/2025 **(53rd)**	Foundation	Apple TV+
2024/2025 **(53rd)**	Severance	Apple TV+
2024/2025 **(53rd)**	Silo	Apple TV+
2024/2025 **(53rd)**	Star Trek: Strange New Worlds	Paramount+

== Most nominations ==
- 5 nominations – The Expanse (Note: Includes nomination for Best Streaming Science Fiction, Action & Fantasy Series)
- 4 nominations – Doctor Who, The 100, Star Trek: Discovery, Westworld
- 3 nominations – Colony, The Orville, Lost in Space, Star Trek: Strange New Worlds
- 2 nominations – Andor, The Ark, Foundation, The Mandalorian, Silo, Star Trek: Picard, The X-Files

== Most wins ==
- 2 wins – Star Trek: Discovery, Westworld

== See also ==
- Saturn Award for Best Network Television Series
- Saturn Award for Best Syndicated/Cable Television Series
- Saturn Award for Best Youth-Oriented Television Series
- Saturn Award for Best Streaming Science Fiction, Action & Fantasy Series
