= The List (2023 film) =

2023 American romantic comedy film directed by Melissa Miller Costanzo

- Poster
- Directed by: Melissa Miller Costanzo
- Screenplay by: Rob Lederer; Steve Vitolo
- Story by: Richard Silverman
- Produced by: Mark Fasano; Annie Mahoney; Tobias Weymar
- Starring: Halston Sage; Christian Navarro; Chrissie Fit; Shelley Hennig; Clark Backo; Jonah Platt
- Cinematography: Broderick Engelhard
- Edited by: Russell Costanzo
- Music by: Maxton Waller
- Production companies: Nickel City Pictures; Universal Studios; New Legend Entertainment
- Distributed by: Universal Pictures
- Release date: August 22, 2023 (United States)
- Running time: 97 minutes
- Country: United States
- Language: English

The List is a 2023 romantic comedy film directed by Melissa Miller Costanzo and written by Rob Lederer and Steve Vitolo. The film stars Halston Sage, Christian Navarro, Chrissie Fit, Shelley Hennig, and Clark Backo.

== Plot ==
The film follows Abby (Halston Sage), a woman whose fiancé Matt (Jonah Platt) was unfaithful with a celebrity from his "free pass" list. Abby and best friend Chloe (Chrissie Fit) decide that Abby get revenge with a celebrity from her own list. The pursuit of this revenge has twists and turns aided by the perspective of Jake (Christian Navarro) and the connections of Sam (Shelley Hennig).

== Cast ==
- Halston Sage as Abby
- Christian Navarro as Jake
- Chrissie Fit as Chloe
- Shelley Hennig as Sam
- Clark Backo as Kenzie Scott
- Jonah Platt as Matt
- Geoff Pierson as Mayor Capozzi
- Lucy DeVito as Patty
- Gregg Sulkin as Cooper Grant
- Will Peltz as Avon
- Nick Viall as Nick Viall
- Delaney Marie Rowe as Leyna Stone
- Rich Morrow as Mac West
- Zach Reino as Connor

== Production ==
On October 25, 2021, Sage was announced to star in the film and serve as executive producer. Christian Navarro and Gregg Sulkin joined the cast on October 28. Jonah Platt, Chrissie Fit, Will Peltz and Zach Reino were added to the cast on November 1. Geoff Pierson and Clark Backo were added to the cast on November 8.

The trailer was released to YouTube by Universal on July 12, 2023.

== Release ==
The film was scheduled to be made available to purchase or rent on digital on August 22, 2023.
