= The Orville =

American science fiction comedy drama television series (2017–2022)

- Also known as: The Orville: New Horizons (S3)
- Genre: Action-adventure; Science fiction; Comedy-drama
- Created by: Seth MacFarlane
- Showrunner: Seth MacFarlane
- Starring: Seth MacFarlane; Adrianne Palicki; Penny Johnson Jerald; Halston Sage; Scott Grimes; Peter Macon; J. Lee; Mark Jackson; Jessica Szohr; Anne Winters
- Theme music composer: Bruce Broughton
- Composers: Bruce Broughton; Joel McNeely; John Debney; Andrew Cottee; Kevin Kaska
- Country of origin: United States
- Original language: English
- No. of seasons: 3
- No. of episodes: 36

Production
- Executive producers: Seth MacFarlane; Brannon Braga; David A. Goodman; Jason Clark; Jon Favreau (S1E1); Liz Heldens (S1); Jon Cassar (S2)
- Running time: 43–45 minutes (S1); 48 minutes (S2); 60–86 minutes (S3)
- Production companies: Fuzzy Door Productions; 20th Television (Note: Known as 20th Century Fox Television for the first two seasons.)

Original release
- Network: Fox
- Release: September 10, 2017 – April 25, 2019
- Network: Hulu
- Release: June 2 – August 4, 2022

The Orville is an American science fiction comedy drama television series created by Seth MacFarlane, who also stars as the protagonist Ed Mercer, an officer in the Planetary Union's line of exploratory space vessels in the 25th century. It was inspired primarily by the original Star Trek and Next Generation programs, and the series pays homage to both. The series also draws inspiration from the Star Wars franchise. Produced by Fuzzy Door Productions and 20th Television, it follows the crew of the starship USS Orville on their episodic adventures, as well as a serialized story which develops over the length of the series. According to MacFarlane, the series and the starship are named after the aviation pioneer Orville Wright.

The Orville premiered on September 10, 2017, and ran for two seasons on Fox and became available on streaming service Hulu the following day, followed – after the COVID-19 pandemic contributed to a three year pause – by a third season exclusively on Hulu in 2022, with the name adjusted to The Orville: New Horizons. After generally unfavorable reviews for season 1, season 2 onward received critical acclaim. The show had relatively successful ratings on Fox, becoming the broadcaster's highest-rated Thursday show as well as Fox's "most-viewed debut drama" since 2015. A fourth season has been in development since 2023, with scheduling conflicts pinpointed as an ongoing impediment as of 2026.

== Premise ==
The Orville is set on the titular spacecraft: USS Orville (ECV-197), a mid-level exploratory vessel in the Planetary Union, a 25th-century interstellar alliance of Earth and many other planets. The series begins in the year 2418, and consists of adventures encountered by the ship's crew, usually involving planet exploration and visits to various parts of the galaxy.

== Cast and characters ==
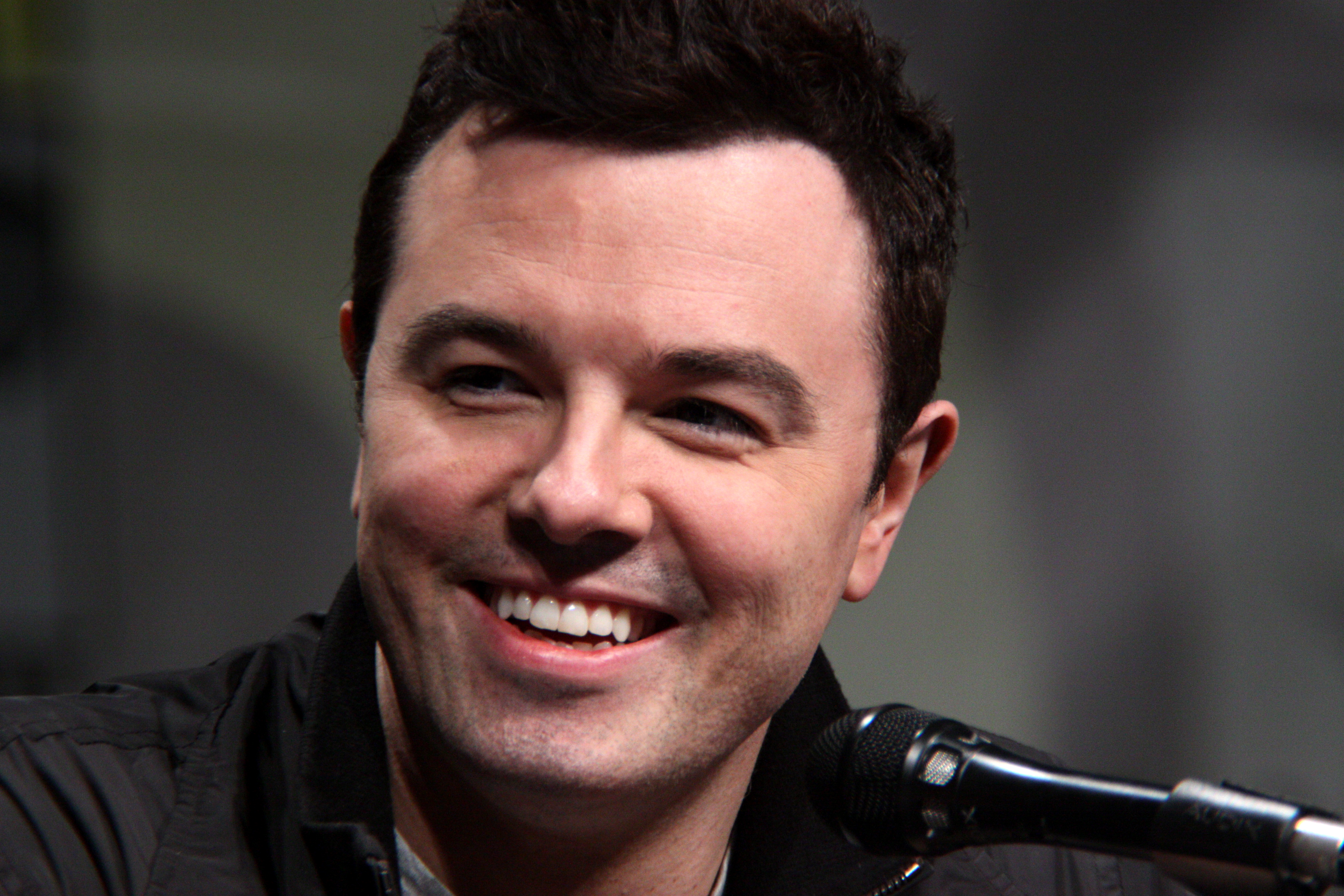
Series creator, star, and co-producer Seth MacFarlane in 2012.

- Seth MacFarlane as Captain Edward "Ed" Mercer:
  The commander of the Orville. Mercer was an up-and-coming officer, on the fast track to commanding his own heavy cruiser by age 40. Following the end of his marriage due to his wife Kelly's relationship with an alien, he is cited for being lax in performance of his duties and for being hung over while on duty. Despite this, he is informed that the Orville, a mid-level exploratory ship, needs a new commanding officer, and that he is the man for the job.
- Adrianne Palicki as Commander Kelly Grayson:
  The first officer of the Orville and Ed Mercer's ex-wife. The two divorced after Mercer caught Grayson in bed with a Retepsian named Darulio, triggering Mercer's year-long emotional crisis. Unbeknownst to Mercer, Grayson personally appealed to Admiral Halsey, asking him to give her ex-husband a command, insisting that, despite personal setbacks, he deserved it. Grayson asked that her involvement remain confidential. When Grayson is assigned as the Orville's first officer, she and Mercer agree to set aside their differences, to work as a team, and stay friends.
- Penny Johnson Jerald as Doctor Claire Finn:
  The chief medical officer on the Orville, holding the rank of lieutenant commander. She has expertise in molecular surgery, DNA engineering and psychiatry. These exceptional credentials gave her her choice of assignments on heavy cruisers. Instead, she chose a mid-level exploratory vessel. As she explains to Mercer in the pilot episode, she prefers to serve where she feels she is needed, finding such assignments more stimulating. When she tells Mercer that she felt that he could use her assistance on his first command, he misinterprets this as indicating her lack of confidence in him, although she denies this. She never found the ideal person to marry, and she chose to become a single mother, but she later starts dating Isaac in season 2, and marries him in season 3. Her two sons Marcus and Ty travel aboard the Orville with her. Although she repeatedly rebuffs Lt. Yaphit's advances, they become physically intimate in "Cupid's Dagger", after falling victim to a Retepsian sex pheromone.
- Scott Grimes as Lieutenant Gordon Malloy:
  The helmsman of the Orville and Mercer's best friend. Considered the best helmsman in the fleet, he was relegated to desk duty after he attempted to impress a girl with a precarious shuttle docking maneuver, damaging the vessel and losing cargo in the process. Mercer specifically requested Malloy's assignment to the Orville, despite Admiral Halsey's lingering concern over Malloy's history of sophomoric pranks. He is generally comfortable with his reputation for limited intelligence, to the point where he willingly answers a series of questions from Grayson, with the expectation that his answers would demonstrate in a Moclan court that males are not always intellectually superior to females.
- Peter Macon as Lieutenant Commander Bortus:
  The second officer aboard the USS Orville. Bortus is from Moclus, a planet where the primary industry is weapons manufacturing, and whose society is dominated by males. This is explained in the first season as the result of the rarity of female births, one of which occurs when Bortus and his Moclan spouse, Klyden, bear a female at the end of the series' second episode. Per Klyden's wishes, but against Bortus's, the infant undergoes a procedure to transform it into a male following a controversial legal ruling on their home planet. This development, and the attitudes prevalent among Moclans toward females that Klyden himself harbors, subsequently persist as a source of tension for the couple, and is a sensitive matter for Bortus in particular, who harbors resentment over it. It is later revealed in the second-season episode "Sanctuary" that female births are far more frequent than Moclan society publicly admitted, and that an extensive network of adult Moclan females exist in hiding from the Moclan authorities. Among the unique aspects of Moclan biology is that they urinate only once a year, with this event being of such significance that Moclans return to their home planet with those closest to them to urinate in a sacred spot chosen by each individual. Moclans also have strong jaws and digestive systems which allow them to eat almost anything, from any kind of meat and plants, to many types of metal and chemicals. Moclans reproduce by laying eggs, which must be incubated for 21 days by a parent. Moclus enjoys considerable political clout because it is a weapons manufacturer on which the Union depends.
- Halston Sage as Lieutenant Alara Kitan (seasons 1–2, special guest star after "Home"):
  The Orville's young chief of security. Kitan is from Xelaya, a high-gravity planet that gives her greater-than-human strength in Earth gravity. She can knock down doors and walls, and crush a solid block of titanium or reshape it into a sphere with her bare hands. She receives the Sapphire Star for her role as acting commanding officer after Mercer and Grayson are abducted by the Calivon during Bortus's incubation of his egg. Sage departed the series in the third episode of the second season when her character resigned her post to be with her family on her home planet after it was discovered that she was losing her strength due to her long period away from her home planet's gravity, using the opportunity to reconnect with her parents.
- J. Lee as Lieutenant (Lieutenant Commander after "New Dimensions") John LaMarr:
  The navigator of the Orville for most of the first season. He and Malloy strike up an immediate friendship in the first episode. Though intellectually gifted, he learned while growing up to hide his intelligence and settle for modest ambitions in order to fit in with his peers. When Grayson discovers his high aptitude in "New Dimensions", she encourages LaMarr to fulfill his potential. As a result, he acquits himself so well during that episode's crisis that he replaces the outgoing Lt. Commander Newton as the Orville's chief engineer.
- Mark Jackson as Isaac:
  Named after Isaac Newton, and serving as the Orville's science and engineering officer, Isaac is a member of the artificial, non-biological race from Kaylon-1 that views biological lifeforms, including humans, as inferior. In the pilot episode, Isaac explains to Mercer that the Union's Admiralty offered a posting to any willing Kaylon, as an attempt to initiate relations between the two powers. Isaac accepted the offer as an opportunity to study human behavior. During the course of his time with the crew, he comes to observe and understand aspects of human behavior, such as relationships, sarcasm, slang, and practical jokes. Isaac perceives his surroundings with his body's internal sensors. His two glowing blue "eyes" are purely anthropomorphic, with Gordon once putting a Mr. Potato Head face on him without Isaac realizing it. After returning to Kaylon-1, the other Kaylon engage in a campaign of genocide against biological lifeforms; Isaac chooses to side with the Union and betray his own people. He later marries Doctor Claire Finn.
- Jessica Szohr as Lieutenant Commander Talla Keyali (season 2–3):
  The ship's second Xelayan Chief of Security, who replaces Alara Kitan after her resignation in season 2. Like Kitan, she is from Xelaya, a high-gravity planet that gives her greater-than-human strength in Earth gravity.
- Anne Winters as Ensign Charly Burke (season 3):
  The ship's second navigator who replaces John LaMarr after his promotion to chief engineer. She distrusts Isaac because her best friend Amanda, whom she was in love with, was killed during the Kaylon attack on Earth.
- Norm Macdonald as Lieutenant Yaphit:
  A gelatinous engineering officer who develops a romantic interest in Doctor Finn. Recipient of the Sapphire Star medal for heroism during the Kaylon conflict.

== Episodes ==
Series overview of The Orville
Season	Episodes	Originally released		
Season	Episodes	First released	Last released	Network
1	12	September 10, 2017	December 7, 2017	Fox
2	14	December 30, 2018	April 25, 2019	Fox
3	10	June 2, 2022	August 4, 2022	Hulu

=== Season 1 (2017) ===
The Orville's season 1 episodes
No. overall	No. in season	Title	Directed by	Written by	Original release date	Prod. code	U.S. viewers (millions)
1	1	"Old Wounds"	Jon Favreau	Seth MacFarlane	September 10, 2017	1LAB01	8.56
2	2	"Command Performance"	Robert Duncan McNeill	Seth MacFarlane	September 17, 2017	1LAB03	6.63
3	3	"About a Girl"	Brannon Braga	Seth MacFarlane	September 21, 2017	1LAB04	4.05
4	4	"If the Stars Should Appear"	James L. Conway	Seth MacFarlane	September 28, 2017	1LAB02	3.70
5	5	"Pria"	Jonathan Frakes	Seth MacFarlane	October 5, 2017	1LAB05	3.43
6	6	"Krill"	Jon Cassar	David A. Goodman	October 12, 2017	1LAB06	3.37
7	7	"Majority Rule"	Tucker Gates	Seth MacFarlane	October 26, 2017	1LAB07	4.18
8	8	"Into the Fold"	Brannon Braga	Brannon Braga & Andre Bormanis	November 2, 2017	1LAB08	3.83
9	9	"Cupid's Dagger"	Jamie Babbit	Liz Heldens	November 9, 2017	1LAB09	3.69
10	10	"Firestorm"	Brannon Braga	Cherry Chevapravatdumrong	November 16, 2017	1LAB10	3.32
11	11	"New Dimensions"	Kelly Cronin	Seth MacFarlane	November 30, 2017	1LAB11	3.63
12	12	"Mad Idolatry"	Brannon Braga	Seth MacFarlane	December 7, 2017	1LAB13	3.54

=== Season 2 (2018–19) ===
The Orville's season 2 episodes
No. overall	No. in season	Title	Directed by	Written by	Original release date	Prod. code	U.S. viewers (millions)
13	1	"Ja'loja"	Seth MacFarlane	Seth MacFarlane	December 30, 2018	2LAB01	5.68
14	2	"Primal Urges"	Kevin Hooks	Wellesley Wild	January 3, 2019	1LAB12	2.82
15	3	"Home"	Jon Cassar	Cherry Chevapravatdumrong	January 10, 2019	2LAB02	3.06
16	4	"Nothing Left on Earth Excepting Fishes"	Jon Cassar	Brannon Braga & Andre Bormanis	January 17, 2019	2LAB03	3.01
17	5	"All the World Is Birthday Cake"	Robert Duncan McNeill	Seth MacFarlane	January 24, 2019	2LAB04	3.18
18	6	"A Happy Refrain"	Seth MacFarlane	Seth MacFarlane	January 31, 2019	2LAB05	3.11
19	7	"Deflectors"	Seth MacFarlane	David A. Goodman	February 14, 2019	2LAB06	3.07
20	8	"Identity"	Jon Cassar	Brannon Braga & Andre Bormanis	February 21, 2019	2LAB07	3.05
21	9	"Identity, Part II"	Jon Cassar	Seth MacFarlane	February 28, 2019	2LAB08	3.15
22	10	"Blood of Patriots"	Rebecca Rodriguez	Seth MacFarlane	March 7, 2019	2LAB09	2.94
23	11	"Lasting Impressions"	Kelly Cronin	Seth MacFarlane	March 21, 2019	2LAB10	2.94
24	12	"Sanctuary"	Jonathan Frakes	Joe Menosky	April 11, 2019	2LAB11	2.59
25	13	"Tomorrow, and Tomorrow, and Tomorrow"	Gary Rake	Janet Lin	April 18, 2019	2LAB12	2.68
26	14	"The Road Not Taken"	Gary Rake	David A. Goodman	April 25, 2019	2LAB13	2.97

=== Season 3: New Horizons (2022) ===
The Orville's season 3 episodes
No. overall	No. in season	Title	Directed by	Written by	Original release date	Prod. code
27	1	"Electric Sheep"	Seth MacFarlane	Seth MacFarlane	June 2, 2022	3LAB01
28	2	"Shadow Realms"	Jon Cassar	Brannon Braga & Andre Bormanis	June 9, 2022	3LAB02
29	3	"Mortality Paradox"	Jon Cassar	Cherry Chevapravatdumrong	June 16, 2022	3LAB03
30	4	"Gently Falling Rain"	Jon Cassar	Brannon Braga & Andre Bormanis	June 23, 2022	3LAB04
31	5	"A Tale of Two Topas"	Seth MacFarlane	Seth MacFarlane	June 30, 2022	3LAB05
32	6	"Twice in a Lifetime"	Jon Cassar	Seth MacFarlane	July 7, 2022	3LAB06
33	7	"From Unknown Graves"	Seth MacFarlane	David A. Goodman	July 14, 2022	3LAB07
34	8	"Midnight Blue"	Jon Cassar	Brannon Braga & Andre Bormanis	July 21, 2022	3LAB08
35	9	"Domino"	Jon Cassar	Brannon Braga & Andre Bormanis	July 28, 2022	3LAB10
36	10	"Future Unknown"	Seth MacFarlane	Seth MacFarlane	August 4, 2022	3LAB11

== Production ==
=== Development ===
MacFarlane originally wrote The Orville as a spec script, which was given a 13-episode order by Fox in May 2016, making it the first live-action television series created by MacFarlane. Following the project's greenlight, MacFarlane said, "I've wanted to do something like this show ever since I was a kid, and the timing finally feels right. [...] I think this is gonna be something special." According to MacFarlane, The Orville was inspired by The Twilight Zone and Star Trek. He was also encouraged to sell the series due to the success of Guardians of the Galaxy and Deadpool.

In November 2017, Fox renewed the series for a second season. "Primal Urges", one of the thirteen episodes for season 1, was held for the second season due to a gap in broadcast dates caused by the broadcaster's lengthy Christmas programming.

In December 2018, it was reported that the California Film Commission had approved $15.8 million of tax credits for a potential third season.

On November 29, 2023, Adrianne Palicki said that while there were talks of a potential fourth season, she had not been notified of the status of those talks. She also said that she does not plan to return for any future seasons either, citing the slow shooting pace, which prevented Palicki and other co-stars from taking on roles in other projects. On January 5, 2024, MacFarlane said the series had not been canceled by Hulu, but could not confirm further details of its future due to "too many factors". On August 8, 2024, actor Scott Grimes announced that Season 4 of The Orville would begin pre-production in early 2025. On March 3, 2026, while promoting season 2 of Ted, MacFarlane said that 10 episodes have been written for season 4 but his own time is needed for its production, as he is busy with other projects.

=== Casting ===
In July 2016, MacFarlane's role was revealed to be Ed Mercer, the captain of the Orville, while Adrianne Palicki had been cast as Kelly Grayson, Ed's ex-wife and newly appointed first officer of the Orville, and Scott Grimes (who voices Steve Smith on American Dad!, another show created by MacFarlane) was cast as Gordon Malloy, Ed's best friend whom he has assigned to pilot the Orville. In August Peter Macon and J. Lee were cast as series regulars. In October Halston Sage and Penny Johnson Jerald joined the cast while Mark Jackson was added in December. In April 2017, Chad L. Coleman was added as a series regular and Larry Joe Campbell in a recurring role.

At San Diego Comic-Con in July 2017, MacFarlane said that Charlize Theron would guest-star in an episode. The two had previously co-starred in A Million Ways to Die in the West. Theron appeared in the series' fifth episode "Pria".

In February 2018, Jessica Szohr was cast as a regular for season 2 and Chris Johnson in a recurring role. In November 2019, Anne Winters was cast as a regular for season 3.

=== Filming ===
In August 2016, actor and director Jon Favreau signed on to direct the pilot. Production on the pilot episode began in late 2016, and the rest of the episodes began filming in March 2017. Production wrapped in August, with a total of $56.2 million spent in California. Star Trek veterans Jonathan Frakes and Robert Duncan McNeill, who have directed episodes within the Star Trek franchise, have each directed one or more episodes of The Orville. Four episodes were directed by Brannon Braga, a long-time Star Trek alumnus who began his career as an intern on Star Trek: The Next Generation, was producer of Star Trek: Voyager, and co-created Star Trek: Enterprise.

Filming for the second season began in February 2018, and Frakes and McNeill each returned to direct another episode. Production for the second season concluded in October 2018, having spent $69.2 million.

Filming for the third season began in October 2019 but was halted due to the COVID-19 pandemic, and ultimately completed in August 2021. MacFarlane and Jon Cassar are the only directors for the third season.

=== Visual effects ===
Studios hired to work on the visual effects of the show include Tippett Studio, CoSA VFX, Pixomondo, Crafty Apes, FuseFX, Eight VFX and Zoic Studios.

=== Music ===
The show uses a 75-piece orchestra for the music in each episode, written by several different composers, such as John Debney, Joel McNeely and Bruce Broughton, who wrote the show's theme and composed the score for the pilot. MacFarlane said "We score it like a movie" and "We really put as much into that as we do into the effects." A soundtrack album for season 1 was released by La-La Land Records on January 22, 2019. On January 19, 2021, La-La Land and 20th Television released a soundtrack album for season 2.

== Marketing ==
On May 15, 2017, the Fox Broadcasting Company released the first trailer of The Orville as part of their upcoming slate of television series including the X-Men series The Gifted and the supernatural sitcom Ghosted. To promote the series, Fox organized a panel at the 2017 San Diego Comic-Con on July 22 featuring cast members Seth MacFarlane, Adrianne Palicki, Scott Grimes, Penny Johnson Jerald, Peter Macon, Halston Sage, J. Lee, Mark Jackson and Chad L. Coleman, and producers David A. Goodman and Brannon Braga. In addition, Fox established an Orville Space Training Station at the Hilton San Diego Bayfront Law with a "Cryopreservation program" for fans.

On July 22, 2018, Fox released the trailer for the second season of The Orville at the 2018 San Diego Comic-Con. To promote the series, Fox sponsored a series of Orville-themed pedi-cabs for people attending San Diego Comic-Con. In addition, Goodman moderated a Q&A panel on July 21 at the Comic Con alongside cast members MacFarlane, Palicki, Jerald, Grimes, Braga and Jon Cassar.

== Release ==
New episodes aired Thursdays on Fox during the 2017–18 season. On November 2, 2017, Fox renewed the series for a second season, which premiered on December 30, 2018. Fox renewed the series for a third season that was originally scheduled to be released on Hulu late in 2020. The third season titled as The Orville: New Horizons premiered on June 2, 2022.

The Orville is available for streaming in the United States on through Hulu, Amazon Prime, and the iTunes Store. In Canada, the series is available on Disney+ and was aired on Citytv. In the United Kingdom, the series is available on Disney+. In Australia, The Orville is available on the television channel SBS Viceland and most of season 3 streams on SBS On Demand and the complete series on Disney+ Star. The series is also available in New Zealand, on Disney+.

== Reception ==
=== Critical response ===
Critical response of The Orville
Season	Rotten Tomatoes	Metacritic
1	31% (55 reviews)	36 (21 reviews)
2	100% (15 reviews)	—N/a
3	95% (15 reviews)	—N/a

==== Season 1 ====
On Rotten Tomatoes, the first season has a 31% critic approval rating, with an average rating of 3.8/10 based on 55 reviews. The website's consensus reads, "An odd jumble of campiness and sincerity, homage, and satire, The Orville never quite achieves liftoff." Metacritic, which uses a weighted average, assigned a score of 36 out of 100, based on 21 reviews, indicating "generally unfavorable reviews".

Liz Miller writing for IndieWire compared the series to Star Trek, calling it a rip-off and "bankrupt: creatively, morally, and ethically". She criticized the lack of creativity, the blatant imitation, and was surprised that the show is "uninterested in being a comedy".

Kevin Yeoman of Screen Rant suggested, "The show might have stood a better chance with a different actor in the captain's chair, one better suited to navigating the inexplicable tonal shifts and maybe earn the audience's patience and empathy in the process".

Tim Surette at TV Guide says, "The truth is, The Orville was never going to win over critics because it's a throwback and goes against everything modern television is. It's not that The Orville doesn't know what it wants it to be, as critics assume, it's that it wants to be a little bit of everything". Surette also noted the discrepancy between audience response and critic response on sites such as Rotten Tomatoes and Metacritic, with audiences response being significantly more positive.

==== Season 2 ====
On Rotten Tomatoes, the second season has an approval rating of 100%, with an average rating of 7.6/10 based on 14 reviews. The website's critic consensus states: "Fun, focused, and surprisingly thoughtful, The Orville's second season makes good use of its talented crew."

Nick Wanserki of The A.V. Club praised the season's first episode "Ja'loja" for its character-driven drama and focus on low-stakes plots which built upon the first season's efforts to develop the crew of the Orville into a group of people that the audience cared about. Liz Miller of IndieWire awarded The Orville a B rating, expressing hope that the series could evolve into a character-driven "dramedy" set in space, which she described as something unique that could make the show worth watching. Ryan Britt of Den of Geek praised the second season for playing to its strengths as a sitcom and addressing the "wonkiness" of the first season.

Kevin Yeoman of Screen Rant opined that the series "had found its footing and maybe its identity in telling smaller, more character-driven stories, that better serve its sometimes confounding mix of sincerity and irreverence."

Will Harris of The Verge similarly noted that the two-part episode "Identity" demonstrated the series' ability to downplay its humor and "hold its own with any of the more traditional science fiction properties out there."

==== Season 3 ====
On Rotten Tomatoes, the third season has an approval rating of 95%, with an average rating of 8.25/10 based on 15 reviews.

Den of Geek reviewer Michael Winn Johnson awarded the first episode "Electric Sheep" five out of five stars. He gave a favorable appraisal of the Isaac-centric storyline for dealing with the themes of prejudice and suicide. Johnson also praised MacFarlane and his creative team for forging an "extremely strong identity" for the show despite its influence from other science fiction franchises, particularly Star Trek. Remus Norona of Collider gave the first episode an A minus, stating that the season premiere is "bigger, bolder, and a whole lot darker." He noted that the first episode explored themes such as trauma, suicide, and grief.

Tell-Tale TV reviewer Nick Hogan observed that the third season had a higher budget than the previous two seasons, allowing more investment in both the practical and special effects. Hogan described the second episode "Shadow Realms" as a "cool, Alien-esque horror story that thrills both psychologically and physically" but criticised the "bloated" storyline. Reviewing the third episode "Mortality Paradox," Johnson praised the episode's writer Cherry Chevapravatdumrong for mixing the third season with "thrills, humor, adventure and even a little horror."

Digital Trends reviewer Michael Green praised the third season, describing it as a "loving homage" and the spiritual successor to Star Trek: The Next Generation. Green also praised the family dynamic between the main characters Seth MacFarlane (Captain Ed Mercer), Adrianne Palicki (Commander Kelly Grayson), Penny Johnson Jerald (Dr. Claire Finn), Mark Jackson (Isaac), Peter Macon (Bortus) and J. Lee (Chief Engineer John LaMarr). Green further praised The Orville's high production values and gave a favorable appraisal of its stories which explored philosophical, intellectual and human interest issues. Green praised the Season 3 episode "Midnight Blue" for exploring the ethical dimensions of gender reassignment surgery and its cameo featuring Dolly Parton. He also gave a favorable appraisal of the time travel episode "Twice in a Lifetime" which explored tampering with the past and sacrificing one's family for the "greater good."

=== Ratings ===
After its premiere on Sunday, September 10, 2017, the show moved to Thursday nights at 9 p.m. In its first broadcast in the new time slot, The Orville became Fox's highest rated Thursday 9 p.m. broadcast in two years. After taking into account DVR and VOD, The Orville was Fox's most-viewed drama debut since the premiere of Empire in 2015.

Viewership and ratings per season of The Orville
Season	Timeslot (ET)	Episodes	First aired		Last aired		TV season	Viewership rank	Avg. viewers (millions)	18–49 rank	Avg. 18–49 rating
Season	Timeslot (ET)	Episodes	Date	Viewers (millions)	Date	Viewers (millions)	TV season	Viewership rank	Avg. viewers (millions)	18–49 rank	Avg. 18–49 rating
1	Sunday 8:00 pm (1–2); Thursday 9:00 pm (3–12)	12	September 10, 2017	8.56	December 7, 2017	3.54	2017–18	63	6.55	TBD	2.0
2	Sunday 8:00 pm (1); Thursday 9:00 pm (2–14)	14	December 30, 2018	5.68	April 25, 2019	2.97	2018–19	TBD	TBD	TBD	TBD

==== Streaming viewership ====
According to Parrot Analytics, which looks at consumer engagement in consumer research, streaming, downloads, and on social media, The Orville: New Horizons was the fourth most in-demand streaming show in the United States during the week ending August 26, 2022. It later moved to sixth place during the week ending September 9, 2022. JustWatch, a guide to streaming content with access to data from more than 20 million users around the world, reported that The Orville was the sixth most-streamed show in the U.S. from May 30 to June 5, 2022. The streaming aggregator Reelgood, which tracks 20 million monthly viewing decisions across all streaming platforms in the U.S. for original and acquired streaming programs and movies across subscription video-on-demand (SVOD) and ad-supported video-on-demand (AVOD) services, revealed that The Orville was the fifth most-streamed series during the week of June 11, 2022. Whip Media, which tracks viewership data for the more than 25 million worldwide users of its TV Time app, announced that it was the fifth most-streamed original series in the U.S. and Hulu's second most-streamed series behind Only Murders in the Building from August 1–7, 2022.

=== Accolades ===
Award nominations for The Orville
Year	Award	Category	Nominee(s)	Result	Ref.
2018	International Film Music Critics Association Awards	Best Original Score for Television	Bruce Broughton, John Debney, Joel McNeely, Andrew Cottee	Won	
2018	Make-Up Artists and Hair Stylists Guild Awards	Best Special Make-Up Effects – Television and New Media Series	Howard Berger, Tami Lane, Garrett Immel	Nominated	
2018	ICG Publicists Awards	Maxwell Weinberg Publicist Showmanship Television Award	Erin Moody	Nominated	
2018	Saturn Awards	Best Science Fiction Television Series	The Orville	Won	
2018	Saturn Awards	Best Actor on Television	Seth MacFarlane	Nominated	
2018	Saturn Awards	Best Actress on Television	Adrianne Palicki	Nominated	
2018	Young Artist Awards	Best Performance in a TV Series – Recurring Young Actor	Kai Wener	Nominated	
2018	Young Entertainer Awards	Best Recurring Young Actor 11 & Under – Television Series	Kai Wener	Nominated	
2019	Dragon Awards	Best Science Fiction or Fantasy TV Series	The Orville	Nominated	
2019	Saturn Awards	Best Science Fiction Television Series	The Orville	Nominated	
2019	Saturn Awards	Best Actor on Television	Seth MacFarlane	Nominated	
2019	Saturn Awards	Best Actress on Television	Adrianne Palicki	Nominated	
2019	Primetime Emmy Awards	Outstanding Special Visual Effects	Luke McDonald, Tommy Tran, Kevin Lingenfelser, Nhat Phong Tran, Brooke Noska, Melissa Delong, Brandon Fayette, Matt Von Brock, Joseph Vincent Pike (for "Identity Part II")	Nominated	
2019	Hollywood Professional Association Awards	Outstanding Visual Effects – Episodic (Over 13 Episodes)	Tommy Tran, Kevin Lingenfelser, Joseph Vincent Pike, Brandon Fayette, Brooke Noska (for "Identity Part II")	Won	
2020	International Film Music Critics Association Awards	Best Original Score for Television	Bruce Broughton, John Debney, Joel McNeely, Andrew Cottee	Nominated	
2022	Saturn Awards	Best Science Fiction Series (Streaming)	The Orville: New Horizons	Nominated	
2022	International Film Music Critics Association Awards	Best Original Score for a Television Series	John Debney, Joel McNeely, Andrew Cottee, Kevin Kaska, Bruce Broughton	Nominated	

== Home media ==
Season 1 of The Orville was released on DVD on December 11, 2018. Season 2 was released on December 10, 2019.

== Comics ==
In 2019, Dark Horse Comics released a pair of two-issue comic book miniseries set between the first and second seasons of The Orville, collected as The Orville: Season 1.5. Both miniseries were written by television series executive producer and writer David A. Goodman, illustrated by David Cabeza, and colored by Michael Atiyeh. The first storyline "New Beginnings" deals with Captain Mercer and Lieutenant Malloy responding to a distress call from a lost Union ship while Commander Grayson has to contend with a domestic dispute between Bortus and his spouse over their son's education. The second storyline "The Word of Avis" deals with the Orville crew investigating a Union ship heading into Krill space.

In 2020, Dark Horse Comics reunited the same creative team for The Orville: Season 2.5, beginning with the two-issue miniseries "Launch Day".

Issue	Story arc	Release date	Story	Art	Colors	Collection	Library Edition
#1	"New Beginnings"	July 17, 2019	David A. Goodman	David Cabeza	Michael Atiyeh	The Orville: Season 1.5—New Beginnings; Release date: February 5, 2020; ISBN 9781506711348	The Orville Library Edition – Volume 1 Release date: October 5, 2022; ISBN 9781506711379
#2	"New Beginnings"	August 14, 2019	David A. Goodman	David Cabeza	Michael Atiyeh	The Orville: Season 1.5—New Beginnings; Release date: February 5, 2020; ISBN 9781506711348	The Orville Library Edition – Volume 1 Release date: October 5, 2022; ISBN 9781506711379
#3	"The Word of Avis"	September 11, 2019	David A. Goodman	David Cabeza	Michael Atiyeh	The Orville: Season 1.5—New Beginnings; Release date: February 5, 2020; ISBN 9781506711348	The Orville Library Edition – Volume 1 Release date: October 5, 2022; ISBN 9781506711379
#4	"The Word of Avis"	October 16, 2019	David A. Goodman	David Cabeza	Michael Atiyeh	The Orville: Season 1.5—New Beginnings; Release date: February 5, 2020; ISBN 9781506711348	The Orville Library Edition – Volume 1 Release date: October 5, 2022; ISBN 9781506711379
#1	"Launch Day"	September 2, 2020	David A. Goodman	David Cabeza	Michael Atiyeh	The Orville: Season 2.5—Launch Day; Release date: March 24, 2021; ISBN 9781506711355	The Orville Library Edition – Volume 1 Release date: October 5, 2022; ISBN 9781506711379
#2	"Launch Day"	October 7, 2020	David A. Goodman	David Cabeza	Michael Atiyeh	The Orville: Season 2.5—Launch Day; Release date: March 24, 2021; ISBN 9781506711355	The Orville Library Edition – Volume 1 Release date: October 5, 2022; ISBN 9781506711379
#3	"Heroes"	November 4, 2020	David A. Goodman	David Cabeza	Michael Atiyeh	The Orville: Season 2.5—Launch Day; Release date: March 24, 2021; ISBN 9781506711355	The Orville Library Edition – Volume 1 Release date: October 5, 2022; ISBN 9781506711379
#4	"Heroes"	December 2, 2020	David A. Goodman	David Cabeza	Michael Atiyeh	The Orville: Season 2.5—Launch Day; Release date: March 24, 2021; ISBN 9781506711355	The Orville Library Edition – Volume 1 Release date: October 5, 2022; ISBN 9781506711379
#1	"Digressions"	May 5, 2021	David A. Goodman	David Cabeza	Michael Atiyeh	The Orville: Season 2.5—Digressions; Release date: March 16, 2022; ISBN 9781506711362	The Orville Library Edition – Volume 1 Release date: October 5, 2022; ISBN 9781506711379
#2	"Digressions"	June 2, 2021	David A. Goodman	David Cabeza	Michael Atiyeh	The Orville: Season 2.5—Digressions; Release date: March 16, 2022; ISBN 9781506711362	The Orville Library Edition – Volume 1 Release date: October 5, 2022; ISBN 9781506711379
#3	"Artifacts"	October 20, 2021	David A. Goodman	David Cabeza	Michael Atiyeh	The Orville: Season 2.5—Digressions; Release date: March 16, 2022; ISBN 9781506711362	The Orville Library Edition – Volume 1 Release date: October 5, 2022; ISBN 9781506711379
#4	"Artifacts"	November 24, 2021	David A. Goodman	David Cabeza	Michael Atiyeh	The Orville: Season 2.5—Digressions; Release date: March 16, 2022; ISBN 9781506711362	The Orville Library Edition – Volume 1 Release date: October 5, 2022; ISBN 9781506711379

== Books ==
Three books have been written about The Orville. On January 16, 2018, Jeff Bond released The World of The Orville. On April 26, 2021, Exploring The Orville: Essays on Seth MacFarlane's Space Adventure was published. On July 1, 2022, Cassandra Parvaz's Religion in The Orville: The Dangers Religion Poses To Modern Society as Reflected In Seth MacFarlane's The Orville based on her theses was released.

=== Sympathy for the Devil ===
The third season was initially announced as having eleven episodes, but one episode was not filmed due to pandemic-related delays. Titled "Sympathy for the Devil", it was instead adapted as a novelization written by MacFarlane, and takes place after "Midnight Blue", intending to be the ninth episode of season 3. The audiobook is narrated by guest star Bruce Boxleitner. The novella was released on July 19, 2022.
