= Mark Jackson (actor) =

English actor

- Born: 23 August 1982 (age 43); Rotterdam, Netherlands.
- Education: Bristol Old Vic Theatre School
- Alma mater: University of East Anglia
- Occupation: Actor
- Years active: 2000–present
- Known for: The Orville
- Website: markjacksonarts.com

Mark Jackson (born 23 August 1982) is an English actor, best known for portraying the artificial lifeform Isaac in the American science fiction television series The Orville (2017–2022).

== Early life ==
Mark Jackson was born on 23 August 1982 in Rotterdam, Netherlands, to British parents Jill Cornelius, a nurse from Coventry, and Andy Jackson, an engineer from Birkenhead. He has a younger sister named Danielle who works as an environmental professional.

== Career ==
Jackson confirmed his earliest television role was a two-episode arc in ITV's The Royal Today. Since 2017, he has had a starring role in the Fox/Hulu series The Orville as artificial lifeform Isaac. Beyond this, Jackson has worked in the theatre, starring in the Royal National Theatre's productions of War Horse and One Man, Two Guvnors, the latter of which he followed on their international tour.

== Personal life ==
Jackson has homes in London and Los Angeles.

== Filmography ==
| Year | Title | Role | Notes |
|---|---|---|---|
| 2007 | Shadowed | Brian | Short Movie |
| 2008 | The Royal Today | Gavin Peacock | Episode 1x49–1x50 |
| 2011 | Let Me In | Soul | Short Movie |
| 2013 | The Kissing Booth | Johnny | Direct-to-Video |
| 2013 | Peppermint | Sebastian | Short Movie |
| 2017–present | The Orville | Isaac | Main cast 36 episodes |
| 2017 | Planetary Union Network | as himself | Podcast-series episodes 1x09 |
| 2018 | The Man Cave Chronicles Podcast | as himself | Podcast-series |
| 2019 | Planetary Union Network | as himself | Podcast-series episodes 2x06 |
| 2022 | Courageous Nerd | as himself | Podcast-series episodes 3x26 |
| 2023 | Forever Young | Jim Petrak | |
