= Halston Sage =

American actress (born 1993)

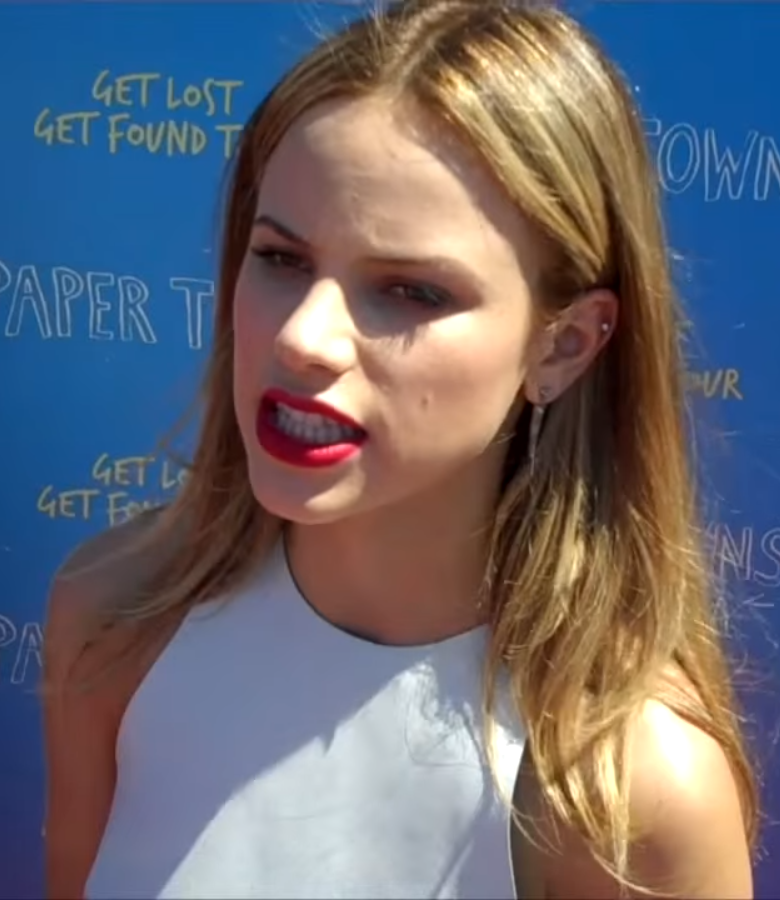
- Sage in 2015
- Born: May 10, 1993 (age 33); Los Angeles, California, U.S.
- Occupation: Actress
- Years active: 2011–present

Halston Sage (born May 10, 1993) is an American actress. She is best known for her television roles, such as Grace on the Nickelodeon series How to Rock (2012), Amber on the NBC series Crisis (2014), Alara Kitan on the Fox series The Orville (2017–2019), and Ainsley Whitly on the Fox television series Prodigal Son (2019–2021). Sage has also appeared in films, playing Lacey in Paper Towns and Kendall in Scouts Guide to the Zombie Apocalypse, both from 2015, and Lindsay in the 2017 film Before I Fall.

== Early life ==
Sage was born and raised in Los Angeles, California. She has a younger brother and a younger sister. Sage is Jewish. She rode horses competitively, and was the editor of her high school's newspaper.

== Career ==
=== Television ===
Sage's career was launched in 2011, when she was cast in the role of Grace on the Nickelodeon series How to Rock, which first aired on February 4, 2012, and ran for a single 25-episode season. She has also guest starred on Nickelodeon's Victorious and Bucket & Skinner's Epic Adventures. In February 2013, Sage was cast in the short-lived NBC television thriller series Crisis, playing Amber, the daughter of Gillian Anderson's character. In 2016, she was cast in a starring role as Alara Kitan on the science-fiction dramedy series The Orville, which premiered on Fox on September 10, 2017. It was reported in January 2019 that Sage had left the cast of The Orville after the episode "Home", though her departure was considered open-ended for a possible return in the future.

=== Film ===
Sage appeared as Brianna in the 2012 teen drama The First Time. In 2013, she appeared in the films The Bling Ring, Grown Ups 2 and Poker Night. She had a role in the 2014 film Neighbors, playing Zac Efron character's girlfriend Brooke Shy. Sage was a nominee for the MTV Movie Award "Best Kiss" for her onscreen kiss with Rose Byrne in Neighbors.

In 2015, Sage played Lacey Pemberton in the film Paper Towns. Also that year, she co-starred in Sony Pictures' Goosebumps, and was cast in the role of Kendall in Paramount's Scouts Guide to the Zombie Apocalypse which centers on a group of Boy Scouts who rise to the occasion as their small town is faced with a zombie outbreak. In 2017, she played another popular high school girl, Lindsay Edgecomb, in Before I Fall.

In 2016, Sage filmed her role in the dramatic comedy People You May Know, and was cast in the thriller film You Get Me. In 2018, she was cast in The Last Summer. She has a cameo appearance in the 2019 film Dark Phoenix playing the role of Dazzler. In 2023, Sage executive produced and starred in the independent comedy film The List.

== Filmography ==
=== Film ===
Year	Title	Role	Notes
2012	The First Time	Brianna	
2013	The Bling Ring	Amanda	
2013	Grown Ups 2	Nancy Arbuckle	
2014	Neighbors	Brooke Shy	
2014	Poker Night	Amy	
2015	Paper Towns	Lacey Pemberton	
2015	Goosebumps	Taylor	
2015	Scouts Guide to the Zombie Apocalypse	Kendall Grant	
2017	Before I Fall	Lindsay Edgecombe	
2017	People You May Know	Tasha Lorino	
2017	You Get Me	Alison "Ali" Hewitt	
2019	Late Night	Zoe Martlin	
2019	The Last Summer	Erin Sinclaire	
2019	Dark Phoenix	Alison Blaire / Dazzler	Cameo
2023	Daughter of the Bride	Kate York	
2023	The List	Abby Meyers	Also executive producer
2025	The Family McMullen	Patricia "Patty" McMullen	

=== Television ===
Year	Title	Role	Notes
2011	Victorious	Sadie	Episode: "Beggin' on Your Knees"
2012	How to Rock	Grace King	Main role
2012	Bucket & Skinner's Epic Adventures	Catherine Toms	Episode: "Epic Crashers"
2012	Figure It Out	Herself	Panelist; 4 episodes
2014	Crisis	Amber Fitch	Main role
2017–2019, 2022	The Orville	Alara Kitan	17 episodes (Note: Main role (season 1 to mid-season 2); special guest star (1 episode season 2, season 3 season finale))
2019	Magnum P.I.	Willa Stone	Episode: "Winner Takes All"
2019–2021	Prodigal Son	Ainsley Whitly	Main role

=== Music videos ===
- "Beggin' on Your Knees" (2011) by Victoria Justice, as Sadie
- "Loving You Easy" (2015) by Zac Brown Band, as Main Beautiful Girl

=== Video game ===
- The Quarry (2022), as Emma Mountebank (voice, performance capture, and likeness)
