= Penny Johnson Jerald =

American actress (born 1961)

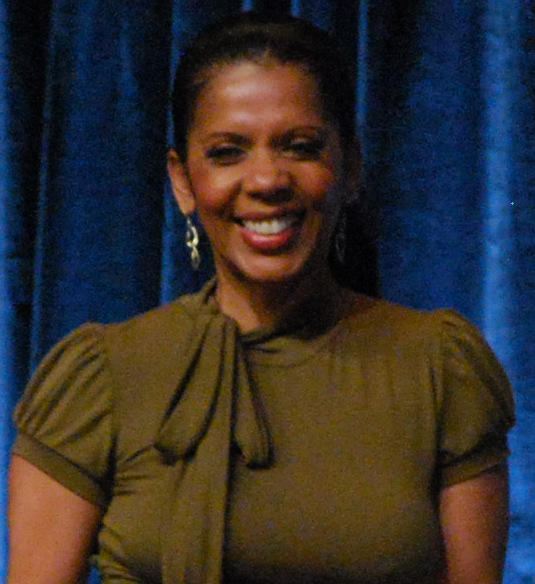
- Jerald at Paleyfest 2012
- Born: Penny Johnson; March 14, 1961 (age 65); Baltimore, Maryland, U.S.
- Education: Juilliard School (BFA)
- Occupation: Actress
- Years active: 1983–present
- Spouse: Gralin Jerald (m. 1982)
- Children: 1

Penny Johnson Jerald (born March 14, 1961) is an American actress. She played Beverly Barnes on the HBO comedy series The Larry Sanders Show, Kasidy Yates on the syndicated science fiction series Star Trek: Deep Space Nine, Sherry Palmer on the Fox series 24, Captain Victoria "Iron" Gates on the ABC comedy-drama series Castle, Dr. Claire Finn on the Fox/Hulu science-fiction series The Orville, and the voice of Sarafina in The Lion King.

== Early life ==
Johnson was born in Baltimore, Maryland, one of seven siblings. She aspired to be an actress as a child. She first attended Western High School before transferring to Park School of Baltimore. Johnson trained at the Juilliard School, where her classmates in 1982 included Megan Gallagher, Jack Kenny, Jack Stehlin, and Lorraine Toussaint.

== Career ==
Jerald began her career with small guest roles. She made her screen debut on an episode of American Playhouse in 1983. Her first major role on television was Vivian Conway in The Paper Chase from 1984 to 1986. She appeared in General Hospital in 1986 and Do the Right Thing in 1989. She portrayed Virginia "Vicki" Harper on short-lived sitcom Homeroom in 1989.

In 1992, Jerald landed the role of unflappable personal assistant, Beverly Barnes, on The Larry Sanders Show. For her work on Larry Sanders, Jerald received a CableACE Award nomination for Best Actress in a Comedy Series in 1996. Two years later, she earned an NAACP Image Award nomination in the category of Outstanding Supporting Actress in a Comedy Series. She continued playing Beverly until the show ended in 1998.

Throughout the 1990s, Jerald guest starred in several television series, including Parker Lewis Can't Lose, Star Trek: The Next Generation, Grace Under Fire, Cosby and Family Law. She appeared as Lavinia in television film Class of '61 and portrayed Lorraine in What's Love Got to Do with It (1993).

Following Larry Sanders, Jerald appeared in Star Trek: Deep Space Nine playing freighter captain Kasidy Yates, the love interest for the series's main character Benjamin Sisko, a recurring role which she played from 1995 to the show's end in 1999. In 1997, she played Laura Simon in the film Absolute Power. She also had a recurring guest role on ER as Lynette Evans from 1998 to 1999. She then appeared as Roscoe Dellums in the Emmy Award–winning TV movie The Color of Friendship. Jerald also guest starred on Frasier, The Practice, Touched by an Angel and The X-Files.

Jerald's most-recognized role came in 2001 when she appeared in the Kiefer Sutherland-led Fox series, 24, playing Sherry Palmer, the wife of Senator David Palmer. Jerald believed it was the first role to test her acting ability, claiming the majority of her previous characters were "easy-going." She appeared in all but two of the first season episodes and multiple episodes of the second and third seasons. She received a Screen Actors Guild Award nomination for Outstanding Performance by an Ensemble in a Drama Series in 2003 alongside her 24 co-stars.

In 2003, Jerald portrayed Condoleezza Rice in DC 9/11: Time of Crisis, a TV movie about the September 11 attacks in 2001. She reprised the role in the miniseries The Path to 9/11, which aired September 10–11, 2006.

Jerald also guest-starred on the sitcom Eve, playing Shelly's mother Beverly in four episodes. She portrayed Rebecca Parrish in three episodes of sci-fi series The 4400 in 2007. Jerald had a recurring role on ABC midseason drama October Road for the 2007–08 season.

She made guest appearances on episodes of Tyler Perry's House of Payne. Jerald gave voice to Amanda Waller in animated series Justice League: Gods and Monsters Chronicles in 2015.

Jerald joined the cast of ABC's Castle in its fourth season as the new captain of the 12th Precinct, Victoria "Iron" Gates, replacing Ruben Santiago-Hudson's deceased character Roy Montgomery as captain of the precinct. In 2015, Jerald announced on Twitter that she had been let go from the series, and was herself "saddened" and "surprised" by the news. Regarding Jerald's exit from the series, Castle showrunner Alexi Hawley stated it was "very difficult" writing her out of the series.

She was later cast in the role of Dr. Claire Finn in the Fox/Hulu science-fiction series The Orville. In 2019, Jerald provided the voice of Sarafina in The Lion King, a remake of the 1994 film.

== Personal life ==
She married Gralin Jerald in 1983. Jerald also teaches acting workshops and produces and directs for Outreach Christian Theater Company, which she and her musician husband founded in 1994. The couple have a daughter.

== Filmography ==
=== Film ===
| Year | Title | Role | Notes |
|---|---|---|---|
| 1984 | Swing Shift | Genevieve | |
| 1984 | The Hills Have Eyes Part II | Sue | |
| 1990 | Goin' to Chicago | Darlene | |
| 1993 | Fear of a Black Hat | Re-Re | |
| 1993 | What's Love Got to Do with It | Lorraine Taylor | |
| 1994 | Molly & Gina | Maria | |
| 1995 | Automatic | Julia Rodriguez | |
| 1997 | Absolute Power | Laura Simon | |
| 1998 | Krippendorf's Tribe | Teacher | |
| 2005 | Rent | Bohemian | |
| 2015 | Justice League: Gods and Monsters | President Amanda Waller | Voice role |
| 2018 | Parker's Anchor | Laurie | |
| 2019 | The Lion King | Sarafina | Voice role |
| 2020 | Celeste's Dreams | Penelope | Short film |
| 2025 | BLKNWS: Terms & Conditions | Herself | Documentary film |
| 2025 | Good Fortune | Elena's Mom | |

=== Television ===
| Year | Title | Role | Notes |
|---|---|---|---|
| 1983 | American Playhouse | Jill Hatch | Episode: "The Files on Jill Hatch: Part 1" |
| 1984 | T. J. Hooker | Lisa Cody | Episode: "Anatomy of a Killing" |
| 1984 | Hill Street Blues | Jackie DeWitt | Episode: "Blues for Mr. Green" |
| 1984 | The Impostor | Michelle | TV movie |
| 1984–1986 | The Paper Chase | Vivian Conway | Main cast (seasons 2-4) |
| 1985 | The Jeffersons | Danelle | Episode: "Last Dance" |
| 1985 | The Grand Baby | Betty | TV movie |
| 1985 | Simon & Simon | Hanna McKenzie | Episode: "Out-of-Town Brown" |
| 1986 | General Hospital | Debbie | Episode: "14 & 15 May 1986" |
| 1987 | 1st & Ten | Phyllis | Recurring role (season 4) |
| 1987 | Women in Prison | Patty | Episode: "Walk This Way" |
| 1988 | Simon & Simon | Evelyn Jacobson | Episode: "Zen and the Art of the Split-Finger Fastball" |
| 1989 | Tour of Duty | Jan Hudson | Episode: "For What It's Worth" |
| 1989 | She's the Sheriff | Dorothy | Episode: "Divorce, Wiggins Style" |
| 1989 | Homeroom | Virginia Harper | Main cast |
| 1990 | Freddy's Nightmares | Elaine Alamo | Episode: "Life Sentence" |
| 1990 | Coach | Susan Birch | Episode: "The Day That Moses Came to Town" |
| 1990 | Kaleidoscope | Paula | TV movie |
| 1990 | Night Visions | Luanne | TV movie |
| 1990 | Parker Lewis Can't Lose | Ms. Miriam Donnelly | Episode: "Teacher, Teacher" |
| 1991 | Columbo | Maxine Jarrett | Episode: "Caution: Murder Can Be Hazardous to Your Health" |
| 1992–1998 | The Larry Sanders Show | Beverly Barnes | Main cast |
| 1993 | Class of '61 | Lavinia | TV movie |
| 1993 | Empty Cradle | Gail Huddle | TV movie |
| 1994 | Star Trek: The Next Generation | Dobara | Episode: "Homeward" |
| 1995 | Sweet Justice | Marcy Lerner | Episode: "Greener Grass" |
| 1995–1999 | Star Trek: Deep Space Nine | Kasidy Yates | Recurring role (seasons 3-7) |
| 1996 | Grace Under Fire | Bailey Alford | Episode: "Love Thy Neighbor" & "Pregnant Pause" |
| 1996 | The Road to Galveston | Laney Roosevelt | TV movie |
| 1996 | Death Benefit | Sylvia Guzman | TV movie |
| 1996 | The Writing on the Wall | Geraldine | TV movie |
| 1997 | Cosby | Penny | Episode: "Brave New Hilton" |
| 1997 | The Gregory Hines Show | Elizabeth | Episode: "Pilot" |
| 1998–1999 | ER | Lynette Evans | Supporting cast (season 5) |
| 1999 | The Test of Love | Hope | TV movie |
| 2000 | Family Law | Christine Webber | Episode: "Family Values" |
| 2000 | The Color of Friendship | Roscoe Dellums | TV movie |
| 2000 | Deliberate Intent | Laura Harmon | TV movie |
| 2001 | The X-Files | Dr. Hellura Lyle | Episode: "Medusa" |
| 2001 | The Practice | Atty. Laura Garrett | Episode: "Awakenings" |
| 2001 | Citizen Baines | Denise Willis | Episode: "A Day Like No Other" |
| 2001–2004 | 24 | Sherry Palmer | Recurring role (seasons 1 & 3), main cast (season 2) |
| 2002 | Touched by an Angel | Eleanor | Episode: "The Impossible Dream" |
| 2003 | Frasier | Carol | Episode: "Maris Returns" |
| 2003 | DC 9/11: Time of Crisis | Condoleezza Rice | TV movie |
| 2004 | Secrets of the International Spy Museum | Guest | TV movie |
| 2005–2006 | Eve | Beverly Williams | Recurring role (season 3) |
| 2006 | Law & Order | Ms. Booker | Episode: "Choice of Evils" |
| 2007 | The 4400 | Rebecca Parrish | Recurring role (season 4) |
| 2007–2008 | October Road | Dean Leslie Etwood | Recurring role |
| 2009–2010 | NCIS | Joanne Torrence | Episode: "Endgame" & "Flesh and Blood" |
| 2010 | Bones | Rachel Adams | Episode: "The X in the File" |
| 2010 | Tyler Perry's House of Payne | Maxine | Recurring role (season 6) |
| 2011–2015 | Castle | Capt. Victoria Gates | Main cast (seasons 4-7) |
| 2015 | Gods and Monsters Chronicles | President Amanda Waller | Episode: "Bomb" (voice role) |
| 2017 | Media | Jackie Jones | TV movie |
| 2017–2022 | The Orville | Dr. Claire Finn | Main cast |
| 2018 | Sideswiped | Cynthia | Episode: "The Rock Star" |
| 2024 | Ted | Principal | Episode: "Just Say Yes" & "Desperately Seeking Susan" |
