= J. Lee =

American actor writer and musician

- Born: St. Louis, Missouri, US
- Education: Indiana University
- Occupations: Actor; writer; musician
- Years active: 2005–present
- Known for: The Orville

J. Lee (sometimes credited as J Lee) is an American actor, writer, and musician known for playing Lt. Commander John LaMarr on the Fox/Hulu science fiction comedy drama television series The Orville.

== Early life and career ==
Lee was born and grew up in St. Louis. He grew up playing piano and plays professionally. "I started playing classical piano when I was 3. I did that all throughout my youth and in high school. I played at Carnegie Hall when I was 12 or 13." He obtained a bachelor's degree from Indiana University's Jacob's School of Music. He worked at Fuzzy Door Productions as a receptionist where he befriended Seth MacFarlane. "People would come up and just have a conversation with me. And Seth and I became cool because when he would come out of his office or the writers room just to get a break, we would just talk about regular life and laugh." He soon began working for MacFarlane on many of his projects, furthering his acting career.

== Filmography ==
=== Film ===
Year	Title	Role	Notes
2005	Stewie Griffin: The Untold Story		Direct-to-video; production assistant
2005	American Dad: The New CIA	Black Dude	Short film
2006	Idlewild	Band Member	Uncredited
2007	A Horror Movie: Starring Smart People	Tony	Short film; also executive producer and editor
2007	Battle for the Crown		Director, writer, producer and editor
2008	Backyard Battle Monsters	Molten Menace	Short film
2008	Coupled with Love	Steve Collins	
2012	Naked Eye		Director, writer and producer
2013	I Forgot My Phone	Partygoer 1	Short film
2017	Career Suicide: Arthur's Edge		Director, writer and producer
2018	Seven Stages to Achieve Eternal Bliss By Passing; Through the Gateway Chosen By the Holy Storsh	Stone	
2019	The Lion King	Hyena (voice)	

=== Television ===
Year	Title	Role	Notes
2007–2009	American Dad!	Various (voice)	3 episodes
2008–2010	Family Guy	Various (voice)	3 episodes; also production assistant (2005-2008)
2009	Seth MacFarlane's Cavalcade of Cartoon Comedy	Bouncer (voice)	Episode: "Fred and Barney Try to Get Into a Club"
2009	Pay It Off		Production assistant
2010	The Cleveland Show	Additional Voices	Episode: "Field of Streams" also writer (2012-2013)
2011	Bandwagon: The Series	J Lee	3 episodes
2015	Lego Marvel Super Heroes: Avengers Reassembled	NYC Citizens / HYDRA Troopers / S.H.I.E.L.D. Walla (voice)	TV special
2016	Sidetracked	Howard	Episode: "Doughnut Sociology"
2017–2022	The Orville	Lt. Cmdr. John LaMarr	Main role
