= Saturn Awards =

Annual awards for film and TV production

- Previous: 53rd Saturn Awards; March 8, 2026; Next: 54th Saturn Awards; Date TBD
- Official event logo
- Awarded for: Best in genre fiction film, television and home media releases
- Country: United States
- Presented by: Academy of Science Fiction, Fantasy and Horror Films
- First award: 1973
- Website: www.saturnawards.tv

The Saturn Awards are American awards presented annually by the Academy of Science Fiction, Fantasy and Horror Films. The awards were created to honor science fiction, fantasy, and horror in film, but have since grown to reward other films belonging to genre fiction, as well as television and home media releases. The Saturn Awards were created in 1973 and were originally referred to as Golden Scrolls.

== History ==
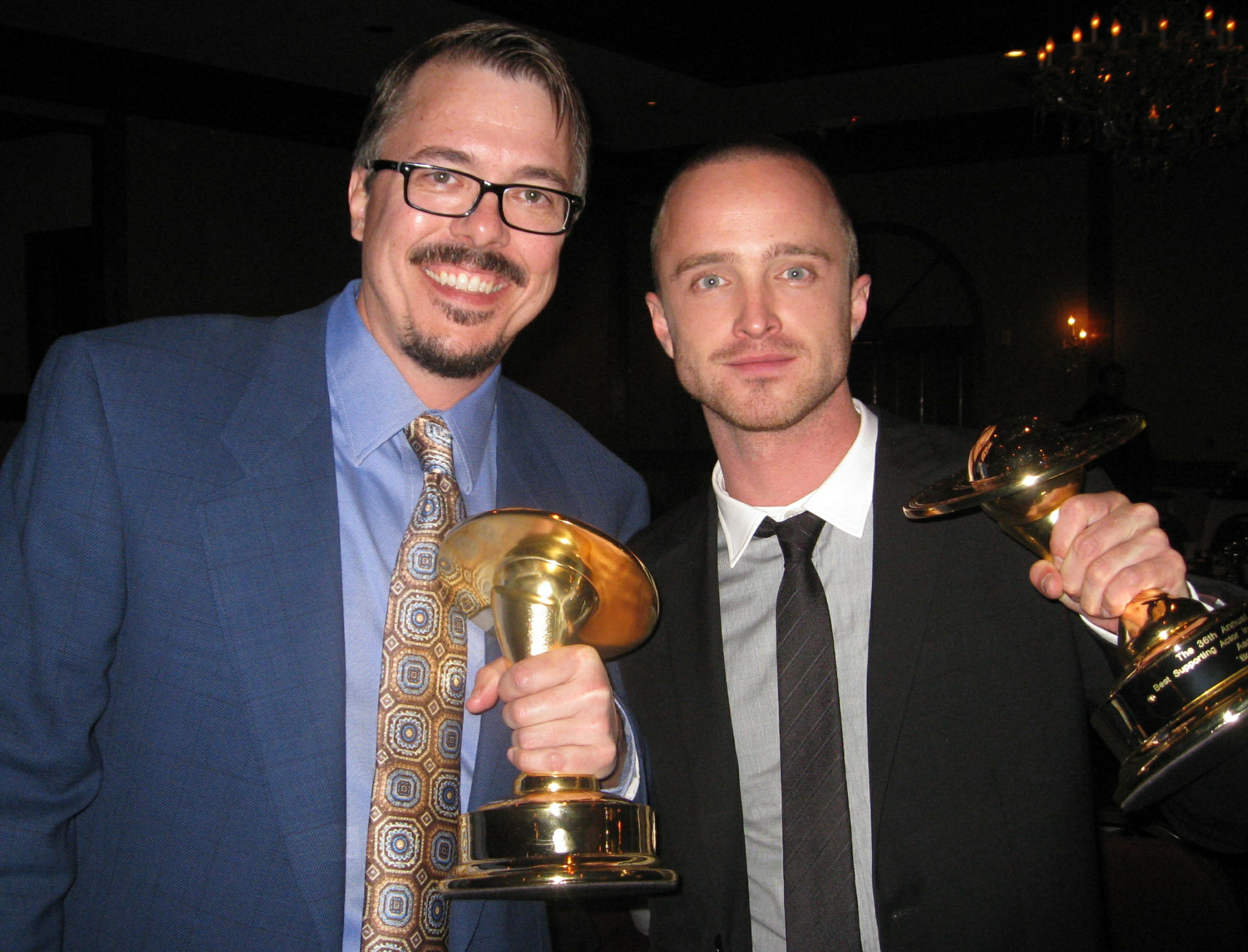
Vince Gilligan and Aaron Paul at the 2010 Saturn Awards

The Saturn Awards were devised by Donald A. Reed in 1972, who felt that work in films in the genre of science fiction at that time lacked recognition within the established Hollywood film industry's award system. Initially, the award given was a Golden Scroll certificate. In the late 1970s, the award was revamped to a representation of the planet Saturn, with its ring(s) composed of a film reel.

The Saturn Awards are voted upon by members of the presenting Academy. The Academy is a non-profit organization with membership open to the public. Its president and executive producer is Robert Holguin, and producer/writers Bradley Marcus and Kevin Marcus. Its members include filmmakers J. J. Abrams, Bryan Singer, Steven Spielberg, Bryan Fuller, Mark A. Altman, Vince Gilligan and James Cameron, among others.

Although the Awards still primarily focus on films and television in the science fiction, fantasy and horror categories, the Saturns have also recognized productions in other dramatic genres. There are also special awards for lifetime achievement in film production.

For the first televised Science Fiction Film Awards in 1978 (as it was called at the time), the production team needed a physical golden award statue to present the winners. Prior to 1978, there was no award statue. The unique statue, with film tape circling Saturn, was created by 19 year old Robert John Wold, the son of Robert Norman Wold, who founded The Robert Wold Company and Wold Communications, located in Los Angeles. The Robert Wold Company was responsible for the televised broadcast of the 1978 Science Fiction Film Awards show, which was held at the Beverly Hilton Hotel. Karen Black was a hostess, and William Shatner performed Bernie Taupin's Rocket Man, while seated at a stool on stage smoking a cigarette.

Following the 46th ceremony held in 2021, the decision to rebrand what would have been the 47th as the "50th Saturn Awards" was made in order to celebrate the 50th anniversary of the Saturn Awards, which were founded in 1973. Subsequent ceremonies have continued with the new numbering. The television categories were majorly overhauled at the 50th ceremony, with several categories being split to recognise both network/cable and streaming series. These changes were reverted at the following ceremony, however. In 2023, the nominations announcement and awards process for the 51st Saturn Awards was postponed by several months in solidarity with the 2023 Hollywood labor disputes.

== Award categories ==
=== Film ===
- Best Science Fiction Film (since 1972)
- Best Horror Film (since 1972)
- Best Fantasy Film (since 1973)
- Best Animated Film (1978, 1982, since 2002)
- Best International Film (1979–1982, since 2006)
- Best Action or Adventure Film (since 1994)
- Best Independent Film (since 2012)
- Best Thriller Film (since 2013)
- Best Cinematic Adaptation Film (since 2026)
- Best International Animated Film (since 2026)
- Best Film Director (since 1974)
- Best Film Writing (since 1973)
- Best Actor in a Film (since 1974)
- Best Actress in a Film (since 1974)
- Best Supporting Actor in a Film (since 1974)
- Best Supporting Actress in a Film (since 1974)
- Best Performance by a Younger Actor in a Film (since 1984)
- Best Music (since 1973)
- Best Film Editing (1977–1978, since 2011)
- Best Film Production Design (since 2009)
- Best Film Costume (since 1976)
- Best Film Make-Up (since 1973)
- Best Film Special Effects (since 1973)

=== Television ===
- Best Television Presentation (since 1994)
- Best Science Fiction Television Series (since 2015)
- Best Fantasy Television Series (since 2015)
- Best Horror Television Series (since 2015)
- Best Action-Thriller Television Series (since 2015)
- Best Superhero Television Series (since 2015)
- Best Animated Series on Television (since 2017)
- Best New Genre Television Series (since 2024)
- Best Actor on Television (since 1996)
- Best Actress on Television (since 1996)
- Best Supporting Actor on Television (since 1999)
- Best Supporting Actress on Television (since 1999)
- Best Guest Starring Role on Television (since 2008)
- Best Performance by a Younger Actor in a Television Series (since 2013)

=== Home media ===
- Best Classic Film Home Media Release (since 2001)
- Best Television Home Media Release (since 2002)
- Best Film Home Media Collection Release (since 2003)
- Best 4K Home Media Release (since 2021)

=== Special awards ===
- The George Pal Memorial Award
- The Life Career Award
- The President's Memorial Award
- Special Recognition Award
- Breakthrough Performance Award

=== Discontinued awards ===
- Best Low-Budget Film (1980–1982)
- Best Comic-to-Movie Film (2013–2024)
- Best Network Television Series (1988–2014)
- Best Streaming Science Fiction, Action & Fantasy Series (2019)
- Best Streaming Superhero Series (2017–2018)
- Best Syndicated/Cable Television Series (1996–2014)
- Best International Series (2007)
- Best Youth-Oriented Television Series (2011–2014)
- Best New Media Television Series (2015–2017)
- Best Streaming Limited Event Television Series (2022)
- Best Streaming Action/Adventure Television Series (2022)
- Best Streaming Fantasy Television Series (2022)
- Best Streaming Horror & Thriller Series (2018, 2022)
- Best Streaming Science Fiction Television Series (2022)
- Best Actor in a Streaming Television Series (2018, 2022)
- Best Actress in a Streaming Television Series (2018, 2022)
- Best Supporting Actor in a Streaming Television Series (2022)
- Best Supporting Actress in a Streaming Television Series (2022)
- Best Performance by a Younger Actor in a Streaming Television Series (2022)
- Best Guest-Starring Performance in a Streaming Television Series (2022)
- Best DVD or Blu-ray Release (2001–2018)
- Best DVD or Blu-ray Special Edition Release (2001–2018)
- Best Home Video Release (1991–2000)
- Best Live Stage Production (2016–2021)

== Records ==
Superlative	Record-holder	Record set	Year	Notes
Most awards for a person	James Cameron	10 awards (Note: Also received 3 honorary awards.)	2022/23	Awards resulted from 15 nominations
Most awards for a person	John Williams	10 awards (Note: Also received 1 honorary award.)	2022/23	Awards resulted from 23 nominations
Most nominations for a person	John Williams	23 nominations	2022/23	Nominations resulted in 10 wins
Most awards for a film	Avatar	10 awards	2009	Awards resulted from 10 nominations (Note: Largest sweep (winning awards in every nominated category).)
Most nominations for a film	Star Wars: The Force Awakens	15 nominations	2015	Nominations resulted in 8 wins
Most awards for a TV series	The Walking Dead	24 awards (Note: The Walking Dead (2010–2022) was nominated for 62 and won 24 competitive awards throughout its run, which lasted for 11 seasons. In addition, the series received a special award in 2024 for the cast and creators of the Walking Dead franchise.)	2021/22	Awards resulted from 62 nominations
Most nominations for a TV series	The Walking Dead	62 nominations	2021/22	Nominations resulted in 24 wins
Most awards for acting	Anna Torv	4 awards	2012	Awards resulted from 5 nominations
Most awards for acting	Robert Downey Jr.	4 awards	2018/19	Awards resulted from 8 nominations
Most awards for acting	Caitríona Balfe	4 awards	2022/23	Awards resulted from 8 nominations
Most awards for acting	Patrick Stewart	4 awards	2022/23	Awards resulted from 7 nominations
Most awards for acting	Mark Hamill	4 awards	2023/24	Awards resulted from 6 nominations
Most nominations for acting	Tom Cruise	12 nominations	2021/22	Nominations resulted in 2 wins
Most awards for directing	James Cameron	6 awards	2022/23	Awards resulted from 7 nominations
Most nominations for directing	Steven Spielberg	14 nominations	2021/22	Nominations resulted in 4 wins
Most awards for writing	Christopher Nolan	4 awards	2014	Awards resulted from 6 nominations
Most awards for writing	James Cameron	4 awards	2022/23	Awards resulted from 7 nominations
Most nominations for writing	Peter Jackson	7 nominations	2014	Nominations resulted in 1 win
Most nominations for writing	Fran Walsh	7 nominations	2014	Nominations resulted in 1 win
Most nominations for writing	Quentin Tarantino	7 nominations	2019/20	Nominations resulted in 2 wins
Most nominations for writing	Guillermo del Toro	7 nominations	2021/22	Nominations resulted in 1 win
Most nominations for writing	James Cameron	7 nominations	2022/23	Nominations resulted in 4 wins
Most awards for a film series	Star Wars	49 awards (Note: Those include 14 (8 competitive plus 6 special awards) wins for Star Wars (1977), 4 wins for The Empire Strikes Back (1980), 5 wins for Return of the Jedi (1983), 2 wins for The Phantom Menace (1999), 2 wins for Attack of the Clones (2002), 2 wins for Revenge of the Sith (2005), 8 wins for The Force Awakens (2015), 3 wins for Rogue One (2016), 3 wins for The Last Jedi (2017), and 5 wins for The Rise of Skywalker (2019). Furthermore, the franchise had 1 win in home video categories.)	2019/20	Awards resulted from 114 nominations (Note: Those include 12 nominations for Star Wars (1977), 8 nominations for The Empire Strikes Back (1980), 10 nominations for Return of the Jedi (1983), 10 nominations for The Phantom Menace (1999), 7 nominations for Attack of the Clones (2002), 10 nominations for Revenge of the Sith (2005), 1 nomination for The Clone Wars (2008), 15 nominations for The Force Awakens (2015), 11 nominations for Rogue One (2016), 13 nominations for The Last Jedi (2017), 1 nomination for Solo (2018), and 12 nominations for The Rise of Skywalker (2019). Moreover, the franchise has garnered 3 nominations in home video categories.)
Most nominations for a film series	Marvel Cinematic Universe	180 nominations (Note: Those include 8 nominations for Iron Man (2008), 1 nomination for The Incredible Hulk (2008), 4 nominations for Iron Man 2 (2010), 4 nominations for Thor (2011), 7 nominations for Captain America: The First Avenger (2011), 6 nominations for The Avengers (2012), 5 nominations for Iron Man 3 (2013), 5 nominations for Thor: The Dark World (2013), 11 nominations for Captain America: The Winter Soldier (2014), 9 nominations for Guardians of the Galaxy (2014), 4 nominations for Avengers: Age of Ultron (2015), 6 nominations for Ant-Man (2015), 8 nominations for Captain America: Civil War (2016), 10 nominations for Doctor Strange (2016), 4 nominations for Guardians of the Galaxy Vol. 2 (2017), 4 nominations for Spider-Man: Homecoming (2017), 2 nominations for Thor: Ragnarok (2017), 14 nominations for Black Panther (2018), 2 nominations for Avengers: Infinity War (2018), 3 nominations for Captain Marvel (2019), 14 nominations for Avengers: Endgame (2019), 4 nominations for Spider-Man: Far From Home (2019), 7 nominations for Shang-Chi and the Legend of the Ten Rings (2021), 1 nomination for Eternals (2021), 9 nominations for Spider-Man: No Way Home (2021), 4 nominations for Doctor Strange in the Multiverse of Madness (2022), 3 nominations for Thor: Love and Thunder (2022), 3 nominations for Black Panther: Wakanda Forever (2022), 1 nomination for Ant-Man and the Wasp: Quantumania (2023), 7 nominations for Guardians of the Galaxy Vol. 3 (2023), and 10 nominations for Deadpool & Wolverine (2024).)	2023/24	Nominations resulted in 43 wins (Note: Those include 3 wins for Iron Man (2008), 1 win for Thor (2011), 4 wins for The Avengers (2012), 3 wins for Iron Man 3 (2013), 4 wins for Guardians of the Galaxy (2014), 1 win for Avengers: Age of Ultron (2015), 1 win for Ant-Man (2015), 1 win for Captain America: Civil War (2016), 2 wins for Doctor Strange (2016), 1 win for Guardians of the Galaxy Vol. 2 (2017), 1 win for Spider-Man: Homecoming (2017), 5 wins for Black Panther (2018), 1 win for Avengers: Infinity War (2018), 6 wins for Avengers: Endgame (2019), 2 wins for Spider-Man: Far From Home (2019), 1 win for Shang-Chi and the Legend of the Ten Rings (2021), 1 win for Spider-Man: No Way Home (2021), 1 win for Doctor Strange in the Multiverse of Madness (2022), 1 win for Guardians of the Galaxy Vol. 3 (2023), and 3 wins for Deadpool & Wolverine (2024).)
Most nominations for a television franchise at a single ceremony	Star Trek	14 nominations (Note: Those include 7 nominations for the third and final season of Picard, six nominations for the second season of Strange New Worlds, and one nomination for the third season of animated series Lower Decks.)	2022/23	Nominations resulted in 5 wins

== Criticism ==
The Saturn Awards has been criticized for having broadened its scope, nominating and awarding prestige movies genre awards (sci-fi, fantasy, or horror) and thereby stretching the meanings of the genres too far.

== Year-by-year results ==
The year indicates the year of release of the films eligible.

- 1972: 1st Saturn Awards
- 1973: 2nd Saturn Awards
- 1974–1975: 3rd Saturn Awards
- 1976: 4th Saturn Awards
- 1977: 5th Saturn Awards
- 1978: 6th Saturn Awards
- 1979: 7th Saturn Awards
- 1980: 8th Saturn Awards
- 1981: 9th Saturn Awards
- 1982: 10th Saturn Awards
- 1983: 11th Saturn Awards
- 1984: 12th Saturn Awards
- 1985: 13th Saturn Awards
- 1986: 14th Saturn Awards
- 1987: 15th Saturn Awards
- 1988: 16th Saturn Awards
- 1989–1990: 17th Saturn Awards
- 1991: 18th Saturn Awards
- 1992: 19th Saturn Awards
- 1993: 20th Saturn Awards
- 1994: 21st Saturn Awards
- 1995: 22nd Saturn Awards
- 1996: 23rd Saturn Awards
- 1997: 24th Saturn Awards
- 1998: 25th Saturn Awards
- 1999: 26th Saturn Awards
- 2000: 27th Saturn Awards
- 2001: 28th Saturn Awards
- 2002: 29th Saturn Awards
- 2003: 30th Saturn Awards
- 2004: 31st Saturn Awards
- 2005: 32nd Saturn Awards
- 2006: 33rd Saturn Awards
- 2007: 34th Saturn Awards
- 2008: 35th Saturn Awards
- 2009: 36th Saturn Awards
- 2010: 37th Saturn Awards
- 2011: 38th Saturn Awards
- 2012: 39th Saturn Awards
- 2013: 40th Saturn Awards
- 2014: 41st Saturn Awards
- 2015: 42nd Saturn Awards
- 2016: 43rd Saturn Awards
- 2017: 44th Saturn Awards
- 2018–2019: 45th Saturn Awards
- 2019–2020: 46th Saturn Awards
- 2021–2022: 50th Anniversary Saturn Awards
- 2022–2023: 51st Saturn Awards
- 2023–2024: 52nd Saturn Awards
- 2024–2025: 53rd Saturn Awards

== See also ==
- Hugo Award
- Nebula Award
- Scream Awards
