= 51st Saturn Awards =

2024 science fiction/fantasy/horror awards ceremony

- Date: February 4, 2024
- Site: Los Angeles Marriott Burbank Airport Hotel, Burbank, California
- Hosted by: Joel McHale

Highlights
- Most awards: Film: Avatar: The Way of Water (4); Television: Star Trek: Picard (4)
- Most nominations: Film: Avatar: The Way of Water (12); Television: Star Trek: Picard (7)

Television coverage
- Network: ElectricNOW

The 51st Saturn Awards were presented by the Academy of Science Fiction, Fantasy and Horror Films to honor the best in science fiction, fantasy, horror, and other genres belonging to genre fiction in film, television, and home entertainment.

The change in the number of the awards name was introduced at the previous ceremony, which was renamed from "47th Saturn Awards" to "50th Saturn Awards" to celebrate 50 years of the Saturn Awards (founded in 1972); this change was also implemented for this edition of the awards. The ceremony was held on February 4, 2024, at Los Angeles Marriott Burbank Airport Hotel in Burbank, California, and was live-streamed for the second consecutive year on Electric Entertainment's OTT app and FAST channel ElectricNow. Joel McHale hosted the event for the second year in a row. This year's show was dedicated to the memory of actor and former Saturn Awards host Lance Reddick (1962–2023), and filmmaker and George Pal Memorial Award past recipient William Friedkin (1935–2023).

The nominations announcement and awards process was postponed in solidarity with the 2023 Hollywood labor disputes, which took place from May 2 to November 9. Ultimately, the nominees were revealed on December 6, 2023. The epic science fiction film Avatar: The Way of Water led the film nominations with twelve — two more than what the original received in 2010 — including Best Science Fiction Film and four acting nominations, followed by Oppenheimer with eleven.

The aforementioned second installment of the Avatar franchise won the most awards with four, including Best Science Fiction Film and Best Film Direction (James Cameron). For the television categories, Star Trek: Picard led the nominations with seven, for its third and final season, followed by Star Trek: Strange New Worlds with six. Overall for television, the Star Trek Universe series, all from Paramount+, received a total of 14 nominations across 3 different shows — Picard (7), Strange New Worlds (6), and Lower Decks (1) — a franchise record for the Saturn Awards for the television categories in a single year. The franchise went on to dominate at the ceremony, winning five awards (4 for Picard and 1 for Strange New Worlds), including Best Science Fiction Television Series for Picard.

This year's Saturn Awards eligibility period for television was from July 2022 through July 2023 while film was extended to September 2023.

== Category changes ==
Introduced

- Best New Genre Television Series

Revived

- Best Superhero Television Series

Discontinued

- Best Actor in a Streaming Television Series
- Best Actress in a Streaming Television Series
- Best Streaming Horror/Thriller Television Series
- Best Supporting Actor in a Streaming Television Series
- Best Supporting Actress in a Streaming Television Series

== Winners and nominees ==
=== Film ===
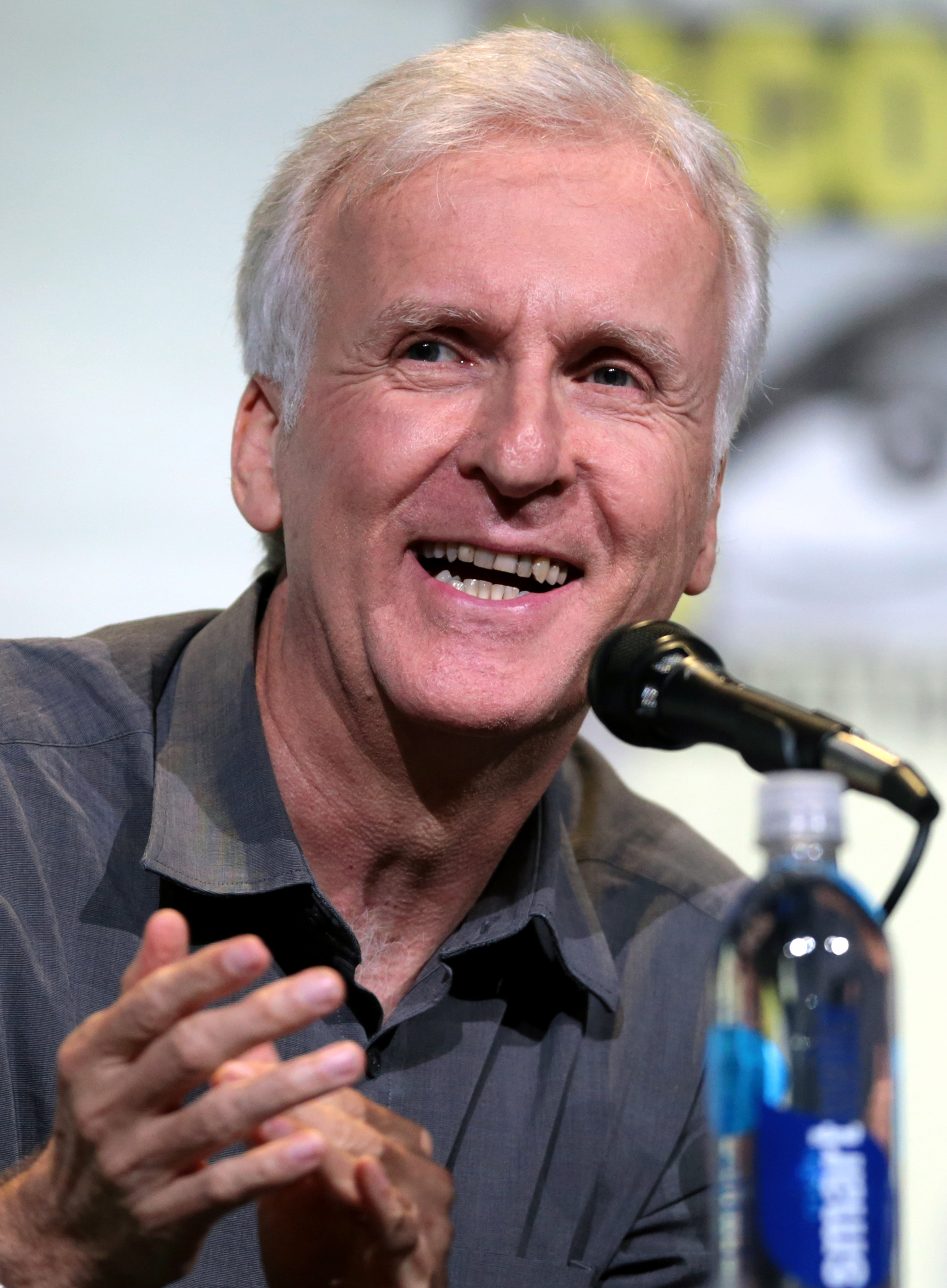
James Cameron, Best Film Direction winner and Best Film Writing co-winner

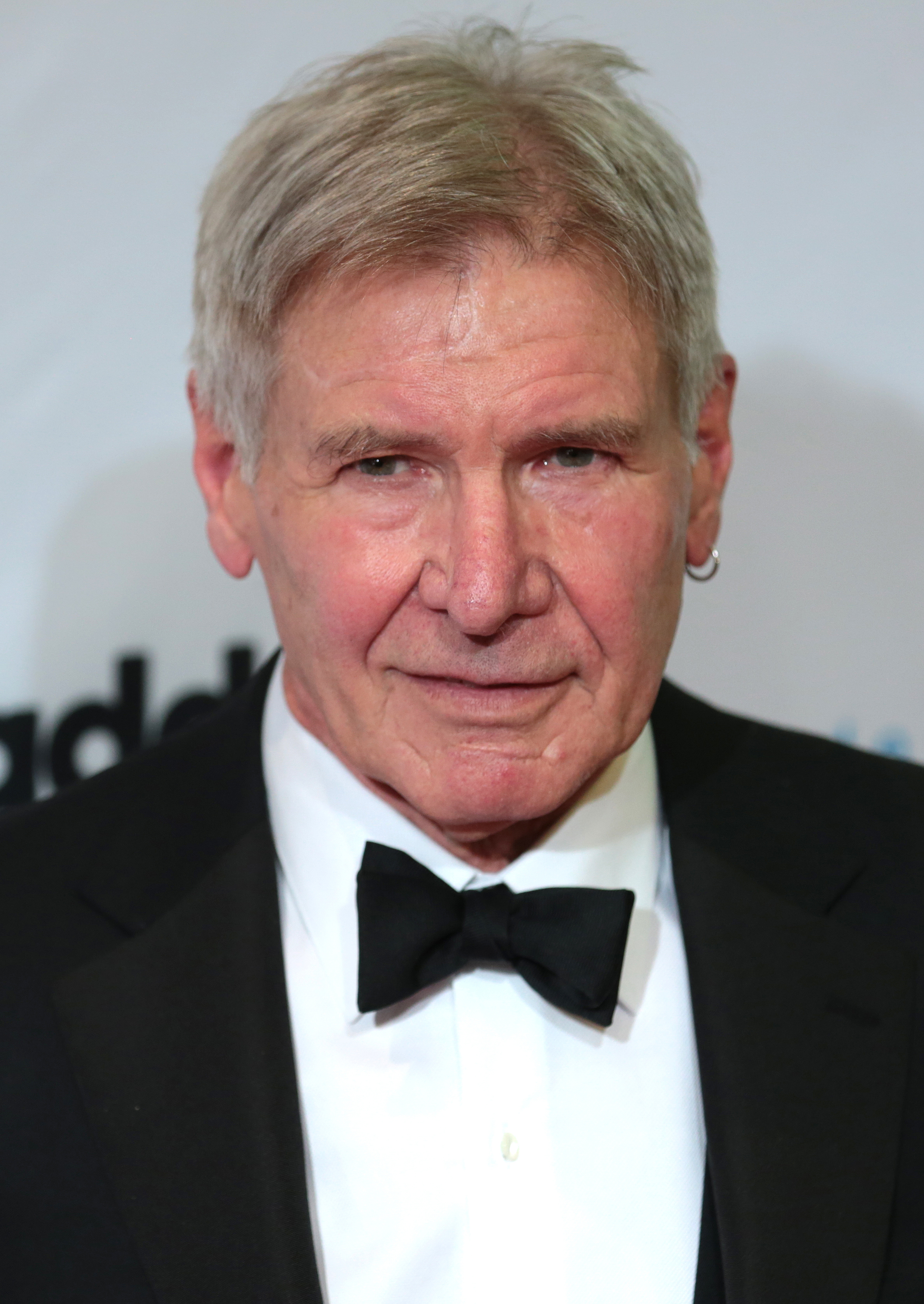
Harrison Ford, Best Actor in a Film winner

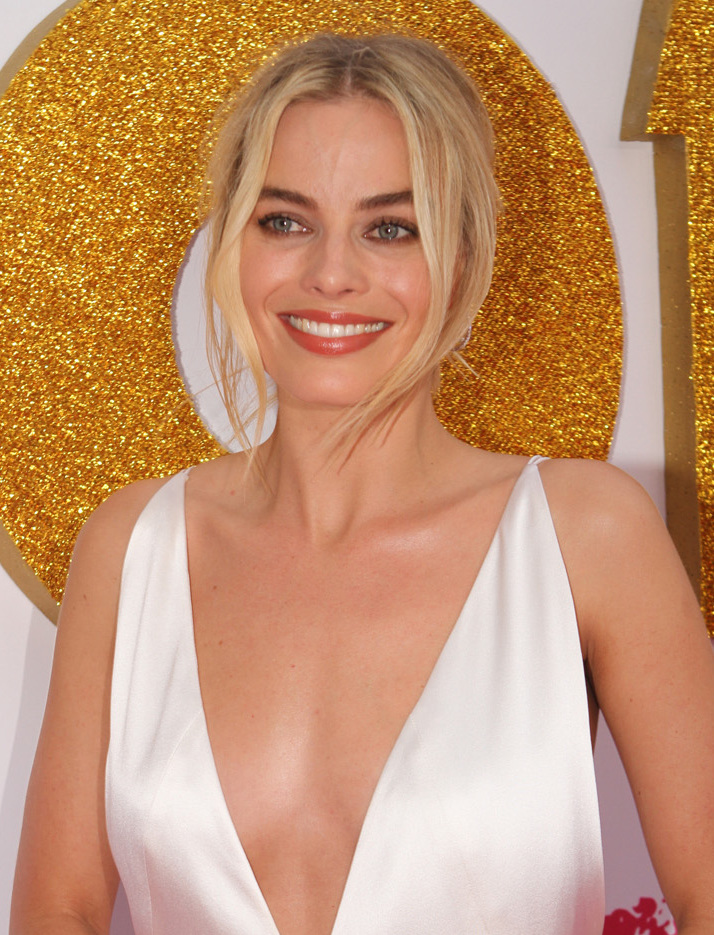
Margot Robbie, Best Actress in a Film winner

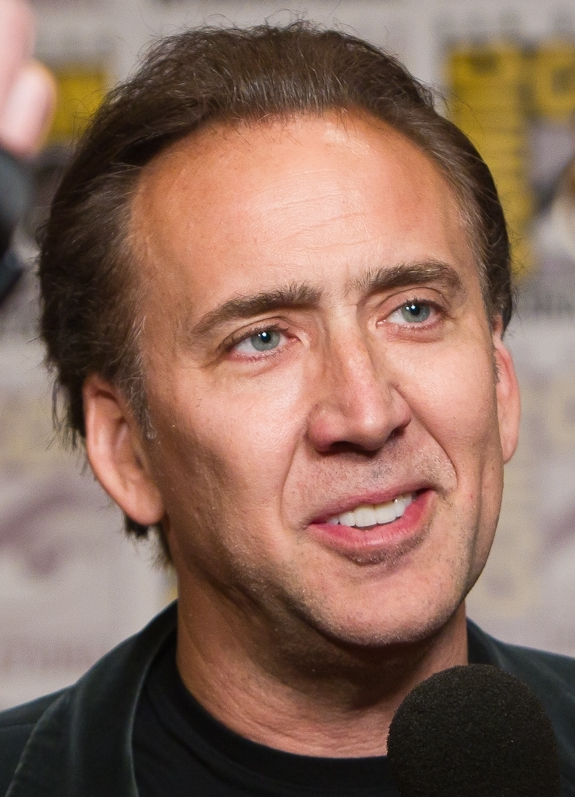
Nicolas Cage, Best Supporting Actor in a Film winner

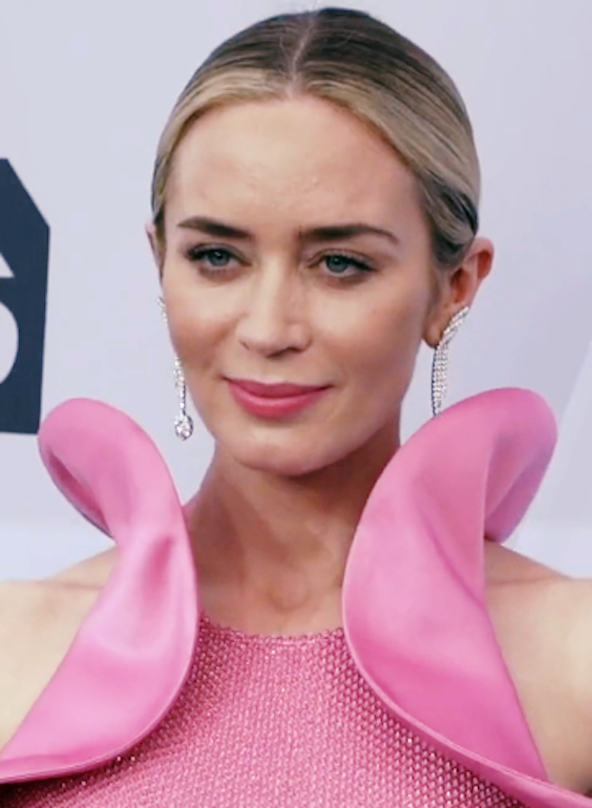
Emily Blunt, Best Supporting Actress in a Film winner

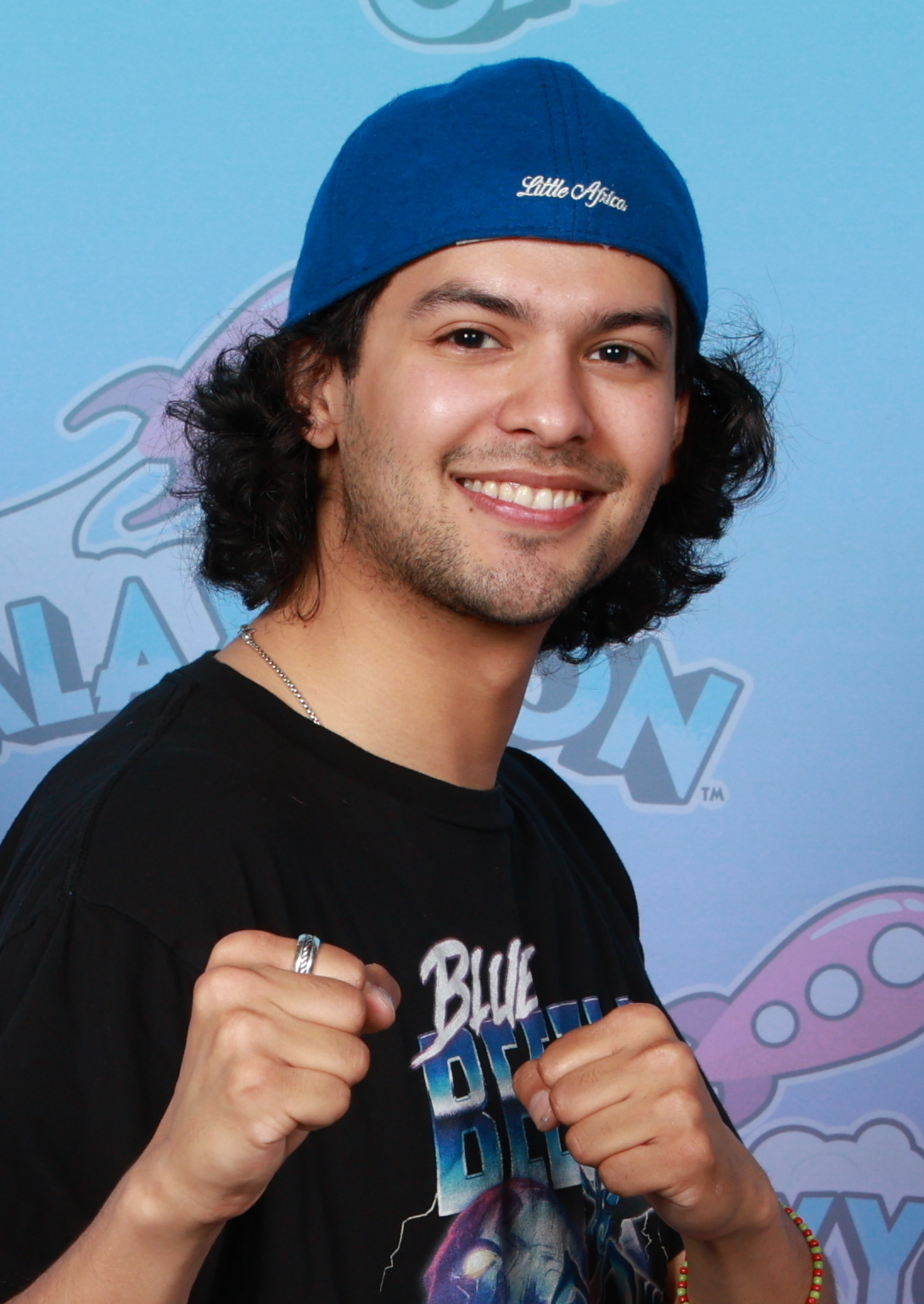
Xolo Maridueña, Best Younger Actor in a Film winner

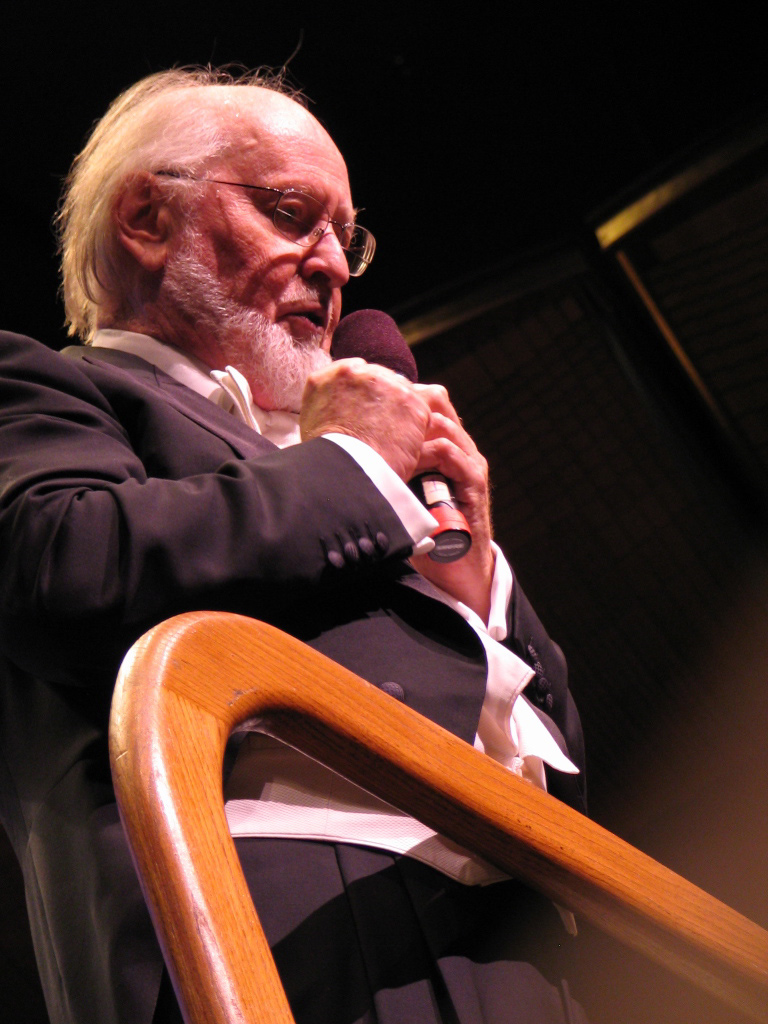
John Williams, Best Music in a Film winner

Best Superhero Film	Best Science Fiction Film
Guardians of the Galaxy Vol. 3; Ant-Man and the Wasp: Quantumania; Black Panther: Wakanda Forever; Blue Beetle; The Flash	Avatar: The Way of Water; The Creator; M3GAN; Prey; Transformers: Rise of the Beasts
Best Fantasy Film	Best Horror Film
Indiana Jones and the Dial of Destiny; Barbie; Dungeons & Dragons: Honor Among Thieves; Haunted Mansion; The Little Mermaid	Talk to Me; Barbarian; Evil Dead Rise; Insidious: The Red Door; Renfield; Scream VI; Smile
Best Action / Adventure Film	Best Thriller Film
Mission: Impossible – Dead Reckoning Part One; Bullet Train; The Equalizer 3; Fast X; John Wick: Chapter 4; The Woman King	Oppenheimer; Don't Worry Darling; Glass Onion: A Knives Out Mystery; Knock at the Cabin; The Lesson; The Menu
Best Animated Film	Best International Film
Spider-Man: Across the Spider-Verse; Elemental; Puss in Boots: The Last Wish; The Super Mario Bros. Movie; Suzume; Teenage Mutant Ninja Turtles: Mutant Mayhem	Sisu (Finland); Madeleine Collins (France); The Missing (Philippines); The Origin of Evil (Canada); Ransomed (South Korea); Speak No Evil (Denmark)
Best Film Direction	Best Film Writing
James Cameron – Avatar: The Way of Water; Greta Gerwig – Barbie; James Gunn – Guardians of the Galaxy Vol. 3; James Mangold – Indiana Jones and the Dial of Destiny; Mark Mylod – The Menu; Christopher Nolan – Oppenheimer; Danny and Michael Philippou – Talk to Me	Avatar: The Way of Water – James Cameron and Rick Jaffa & Amanda Silver; Barbie – Noah Baumbach and Greta Gerwig; The Menu – Seth Reiss and Will Tracy; Mission: Impossible – Dead Reckoning Part One – Erik Jendresen and Christopher McQuarrie; Oppenheimer – Christopher Nolan; Pearl – Mia Goth and Ti West
Best Actor in a Film	Best Actress in a Film
Harrison Ford – Indiana Jones and the Dial of Destiny as Indiana Jones; Ralph Fiennes – The Menu as Chef Julian Slowik; Ben Kingsley – Jules as Milton Robinson; Cillian Murphy – Oppenheimer as J. Robert Oppenheimer; Chris Pratt – Guardians of the Galaxy Vol. 3 as Peter Quill / Star-Lord; Keanu Reeves – John Wick: Chapter 4 as John Wick; Sam Worthington – Avatar: The Way of Water as Jake Sully	Margot Robbie – Barbie as Barbie; Viola Davis – The Woman King as General Nanisca; Mia Goth – Pearl as Pearl; Amber Midthunder – Prey as Naru; Zoe Saldaña – Avatar: The Way of Water as Neytiri; Anya Taylor-Joy – The Menu as Margot Mills / Erin
Best Supporting Actor in a Film	Best Supporting Actress in a Film
Nicolas Cage – Renfield as Dracula; Robert Downey Jr. – Oppenheimer as Lewis Strauss; Ryan Gosling – Barbie as Ken; Michael Keaton – The Flash as Bruce Wayne / Batman; Stephen Lang – Avatar: The Way of Water as Miles Quaritch; Mads Mikkelsen – Indiana Jones and the Dial of Destiny as Jürgen Voller	Emily Blunt – Oppenheimer as Kitty Oppenheimer; Angela Bassett – Black Panther: Wakanda Forever as Queen Ramonda; Jane Curtin – Jules as Joyce; Melissa McCarthy – The Little Mermaid as Ursula; Phoebe Waller-Bridge – Indiana Jones and the Dial of Destiny as Helena Shaw; Sophie Wilde – Talk to Me as Mia
Best Younger Actor in a Film	Best Film Editing
Xolo Maridueña – Blue Beetle as Jaime Reyes / Blue Beetle; Halle Bailey – The Little Mermaid as Ariel; Vivien Lyra Blair – The Boogeyman as Sawyer Harper; Jack Champion – Avatar: The Way of Water as Miles "Spider" Socorro; Violet McGraw – M3GAN as Cady; Noah Schnapp – The Tutor as Jackson	Oppenheimer – Jennifer Lame; Avatar: The Way of Water – Stephen Rivkin, David Brenner, John Refoua, and James Cameron; Fast X – Dylan Highsmith, Kelly Matsumoto, Corbin Mehl, and Laura Yanovich; Indiana Jones and the Dial of Destiny – Andrew Buckland, Michael McCusker, and Dirk Westervelt; John Wick: Chapter 4 – Nathan Orloff; Mission: Impossible – Dead Reckoning Part One – Eddie Hamilton
Best Music in a Film	Best Film Production Designer
Indiana Jones and the Dial of Destiny – John Williams; Avatar: The Way of Water – Simon Franglen; Barbie – Mark Ronson and Andrew Wyatt; The Little Mermaid – Alan Menken; Renfield – Marco Beltrami; Spider-Man: Across the Spider-Verse – Daniel Pemberton	Barbie – Sarah Greenwood; Avatar: The Way of Water – Dylan Cole and Ben Procter; Guardians of the Galaxy Vol. 3 – Beth Mickie; John Wick: Chapter 4 – Kevin Kavanaugh; Oppenheimer – Ruth De Jong; Renfield – Alec Hammond
Best Film Costume Design	Best Make-Up in a Film
Barbie – Jacqueline Durran; Avatar: The Way of Water – Bob Buck and Deborah Scott; Black Panther: Wakanda Forever – Ruth E. Carter; Guardians of the Galaxy Vol. 3 – Judianna Makovsky; Indiana Jones and the Dial of Destiny – Joanna Johnston; Oppenheimer – Ellen Mirojnick	The Covenant – Donald Mowat; Evil Dead Rise – Luke Polti; Guardians of the Galaxy Vol. 3 – Alexei Dmitriew, Lindsay MacGowan, and Shane Mahan; Oppenheimer – Luisa Abel and Jason Hamer; Prey – Alec Gillis and Tom Woodruff Jr.; Renfield – Christien Tinsley
Best Film Special / Visual Effects	Best Independent Film
Avatar: The Way of Water – Joe Letteri, Richard Baneham, Eric Saindon, and Daniel Barrett; The Creator – Jay Cooper, Ian Comley, Andrew Roberts, and Neil Corbould; Guardians of the Galaxy Vol. 3 – Stéphane Ceretti, Alexis Wajsbrot, Guy Williams, and Dan Sudick; Indiana Jones and the Dial of Destiny – Andrew Whitehurst, Kathy Siegel, Robert Weaver, and Alistair Williams; Mission: Impossible – Dead Reckoning Part One – Alex Wuttke, Simone Coco, Jeff Sutherland, and Neil Corbould; Oppenheimer – Andrew Jackson, Giacomo Mineo, Scott R. Fisher, and Dave Drzewiecki	Pearl; Aporia; Brooklyn 45; Fall; Jules; The Tutor

=== Television ===
==== Programs ====
Best Science Fiction Television Series	Best Fantasy Television Series
Star Trek: Picard (Paramount+); Andor (Disney+); Foundation (Apple TV+); The Mandalorian (Disney+); The Peripheral (Prime Video); Silo (Apple TV+); Star Trek: Strange New Worlds (Paramount+)	Wednesday (Netflix); Ghosts (CBS); Good Omens (Prime Video); House of the Dragon (HBO / Max); The Lord of the Rings: The Rings of Power (Prime Video); Mayfair Witches (AMC); Schmigadoon! (Apple TV+)
Best Horror Television Series	Best Action / Adventure / Thriller Television Series
The Last of Us (HBO / Max); American Horror Story (FX / Hulu); Anne Rice's Interview with the Vampire (AMC); Chucky (Syfy / USA Network); Fear the Walking Dead (AMC); From (MGM+); What We Do in the Shadows (FX / Hulu)	Outlander (Starz); La Brea (NBC); Manifest (Netflix); Quantum Leap (NBC); Tom Clancy's Jack Ryan (Prime Video); The Witcher (Netflix); Yellowjackets (Showtime)
Best Animated Television Series or Special	Best Superhero Television Series
Star Wars: The Bad Batch (Disney+); Chainsaw Man (Crunchyroll); Gremlins: Secrets of the Mogwai (HBO / Max); Guillermo del Toro's Pinocchio (Netflix); Harley Quinn (HBO / Max); My Adventures with Superman (Adult Swim); Star Trek: Lower Decks (Paramount+)	Superman & Lois (The CW); Doom Patrol (HBO / Max); The Flash (The CW); The Sandman (Netflix); Secret Invasion (Disney+); She-Hulk: Attorney at Law (Disney+); Stargirl (The CW)
Best Television Presentation	Best New Genre Television Series
Werewolf by Night (Disney+); Black Mirror (Netflix); Guillermo del Toro's Cabinet of Curiosities (Netflix); Hocus Pocus 2 (Disney+); The Midnight Club (Netflix); Mrs. Davis (Peacock); The Munsters (Netflix)	Andor (Disney+); The Ark (Syfy); The Last of Us (HBO / Max); The Lord of the Rings: The Rings of Power (Prime Video); Silo (Apple TV+); The Walking Dead: Dead City (AMC); Wednesday (Netflix)

==== Acting ====
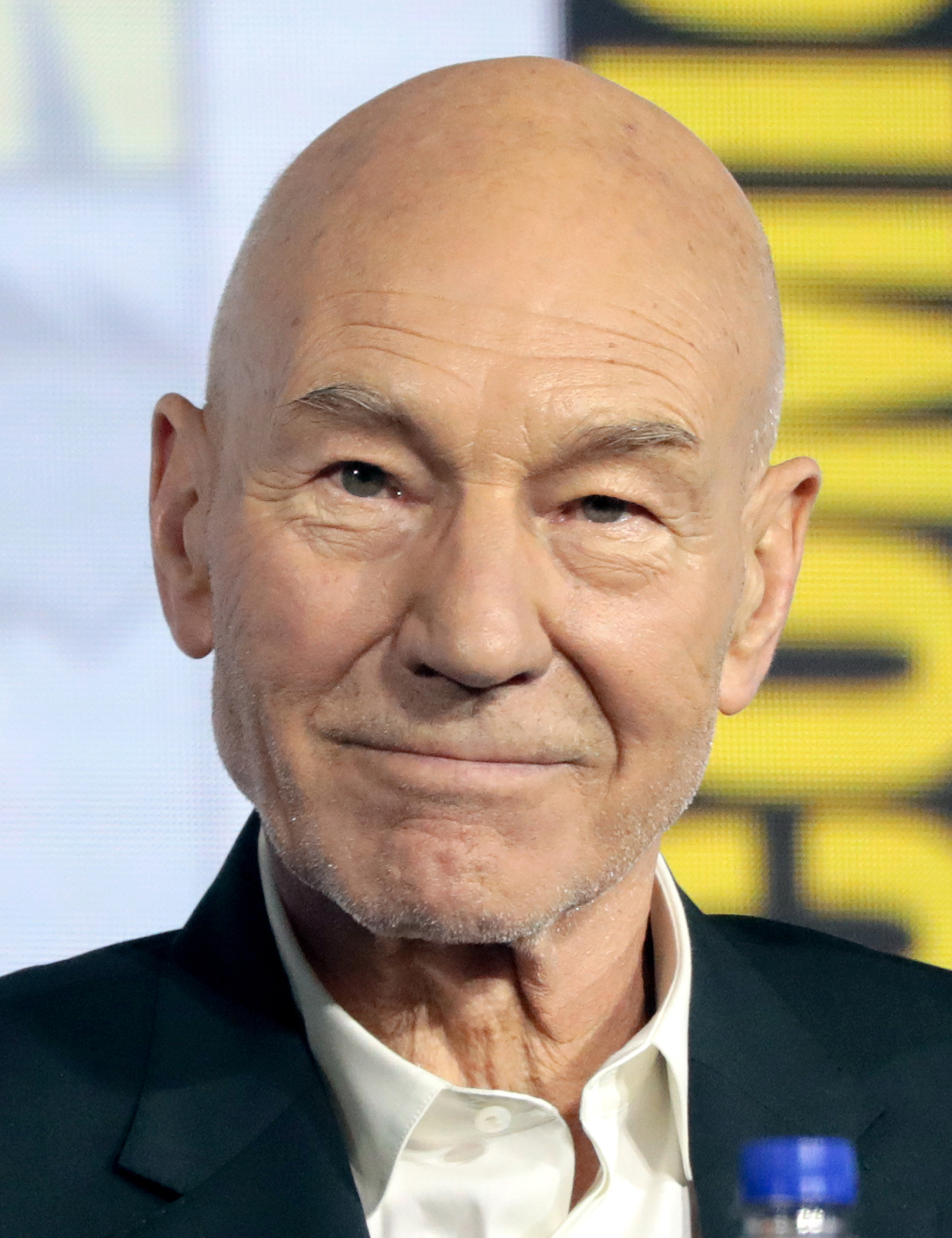
Patrick Stewart, Best Actor in a Television Series winner

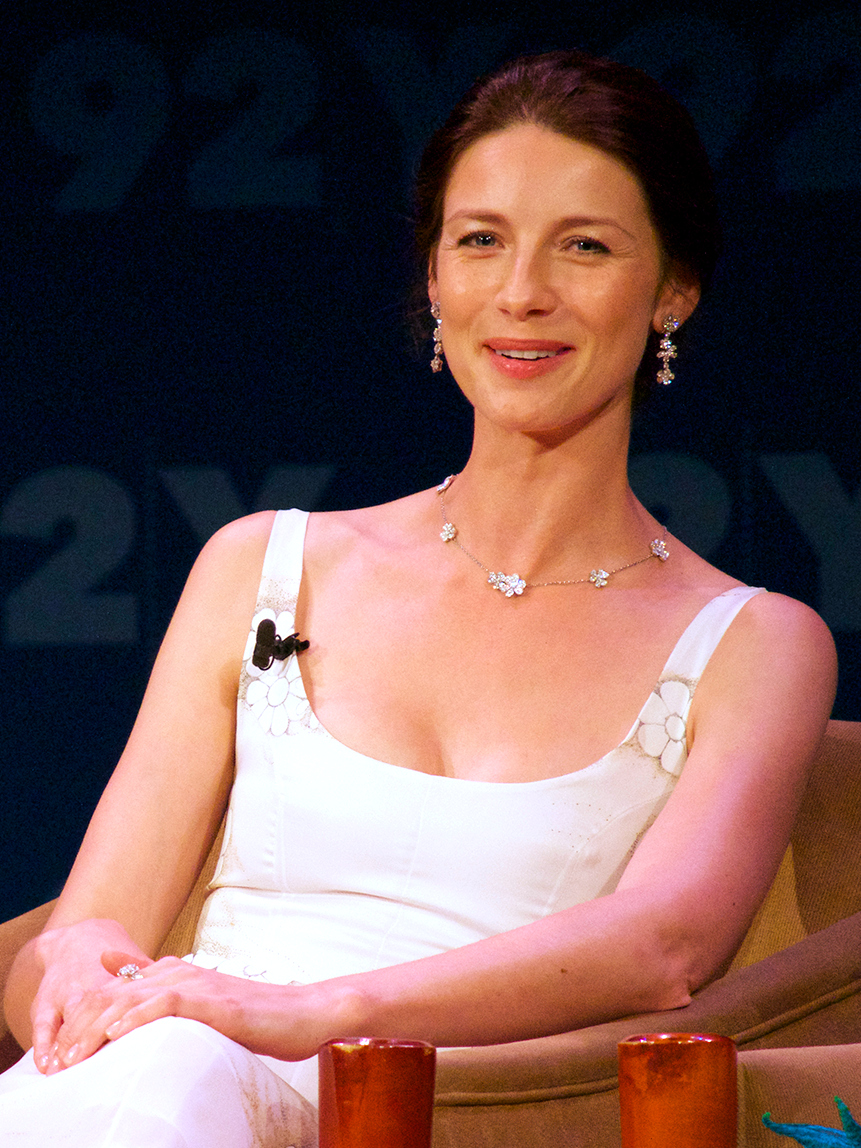
Caitríona Balfe, Best Actress in a Television Series winner

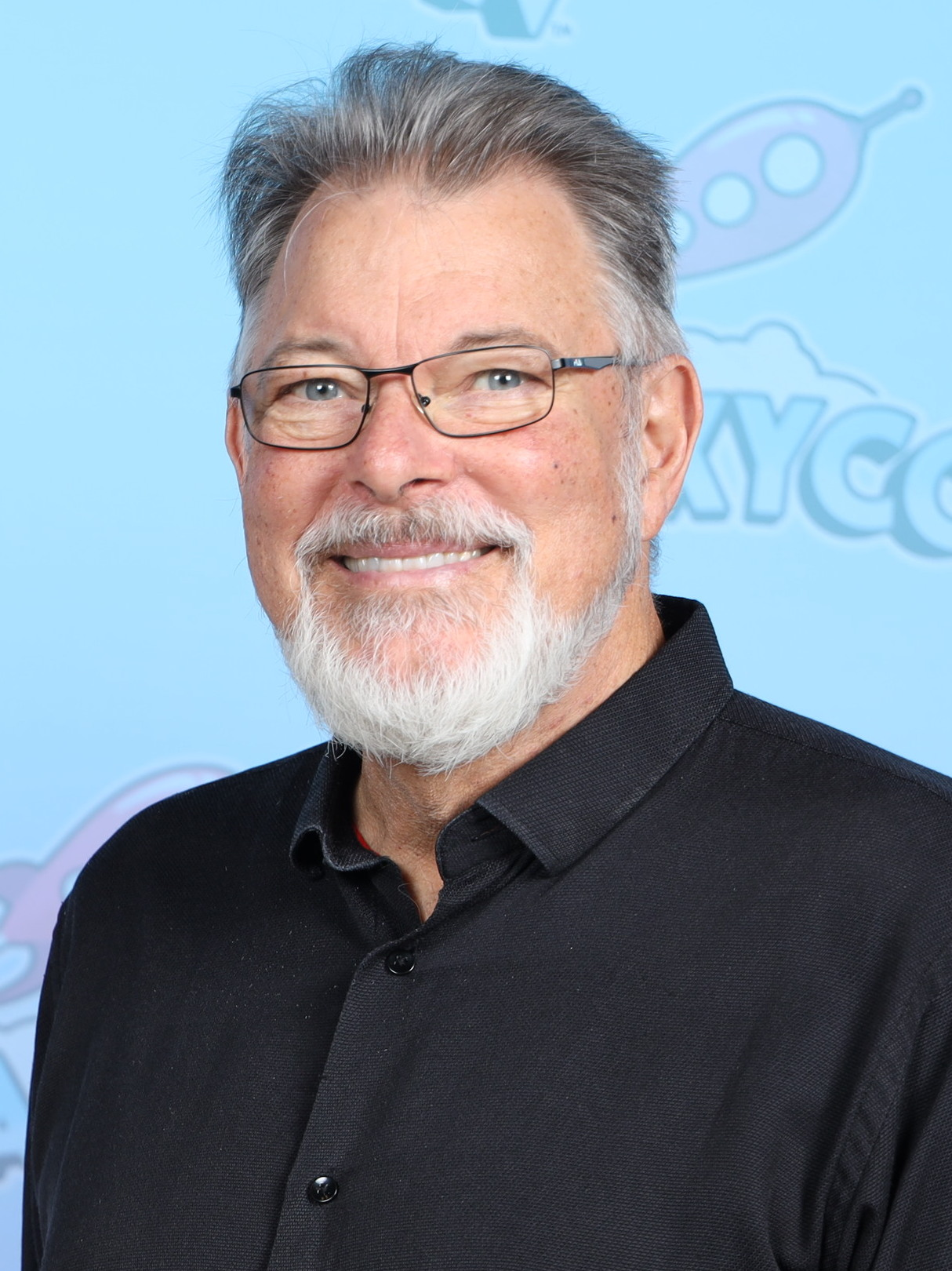
Jonathan Frakes, Best Supporting Actor in a Television Series winner

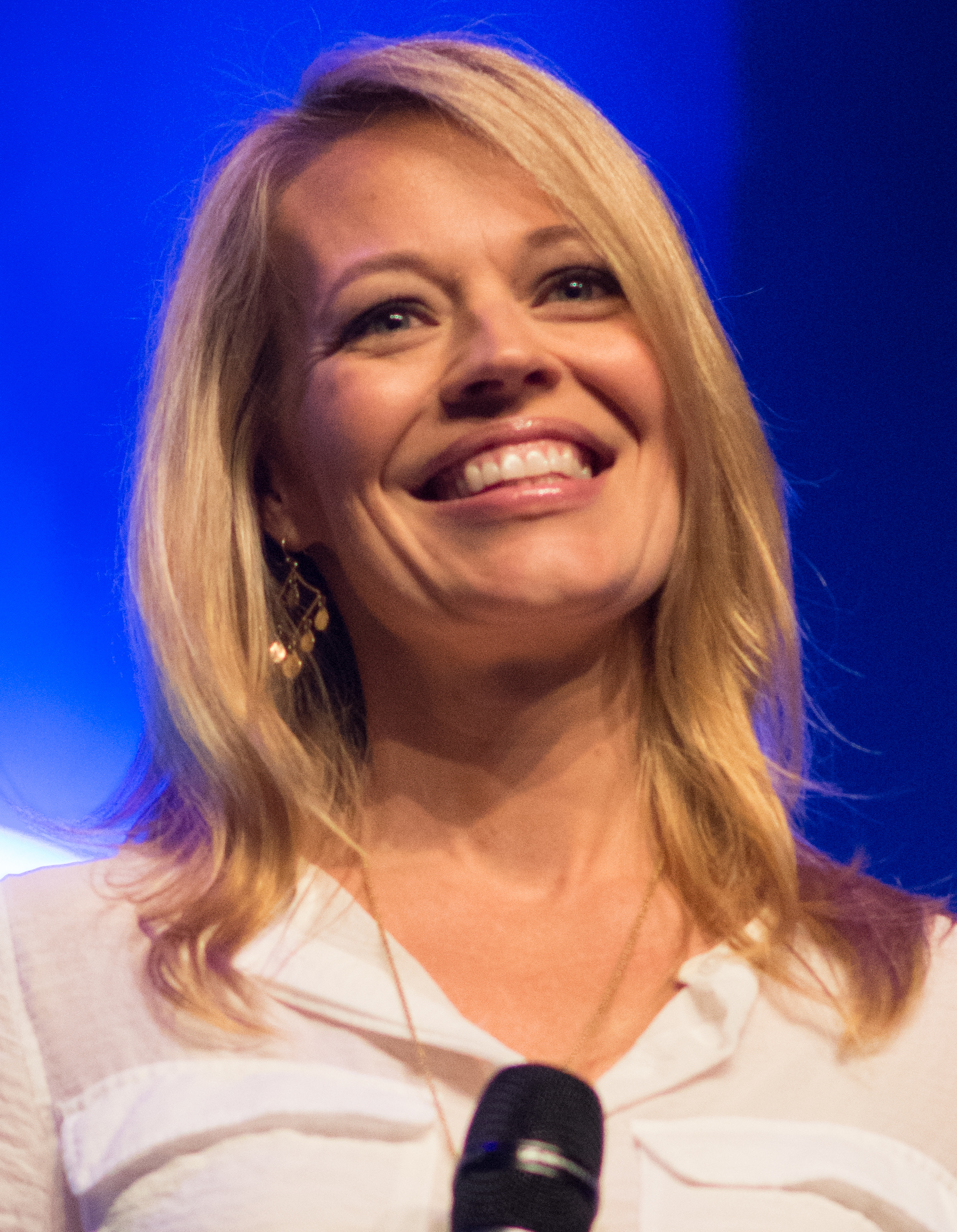
Jeri Ryan, Best Supporting Actress in a Television Series winner

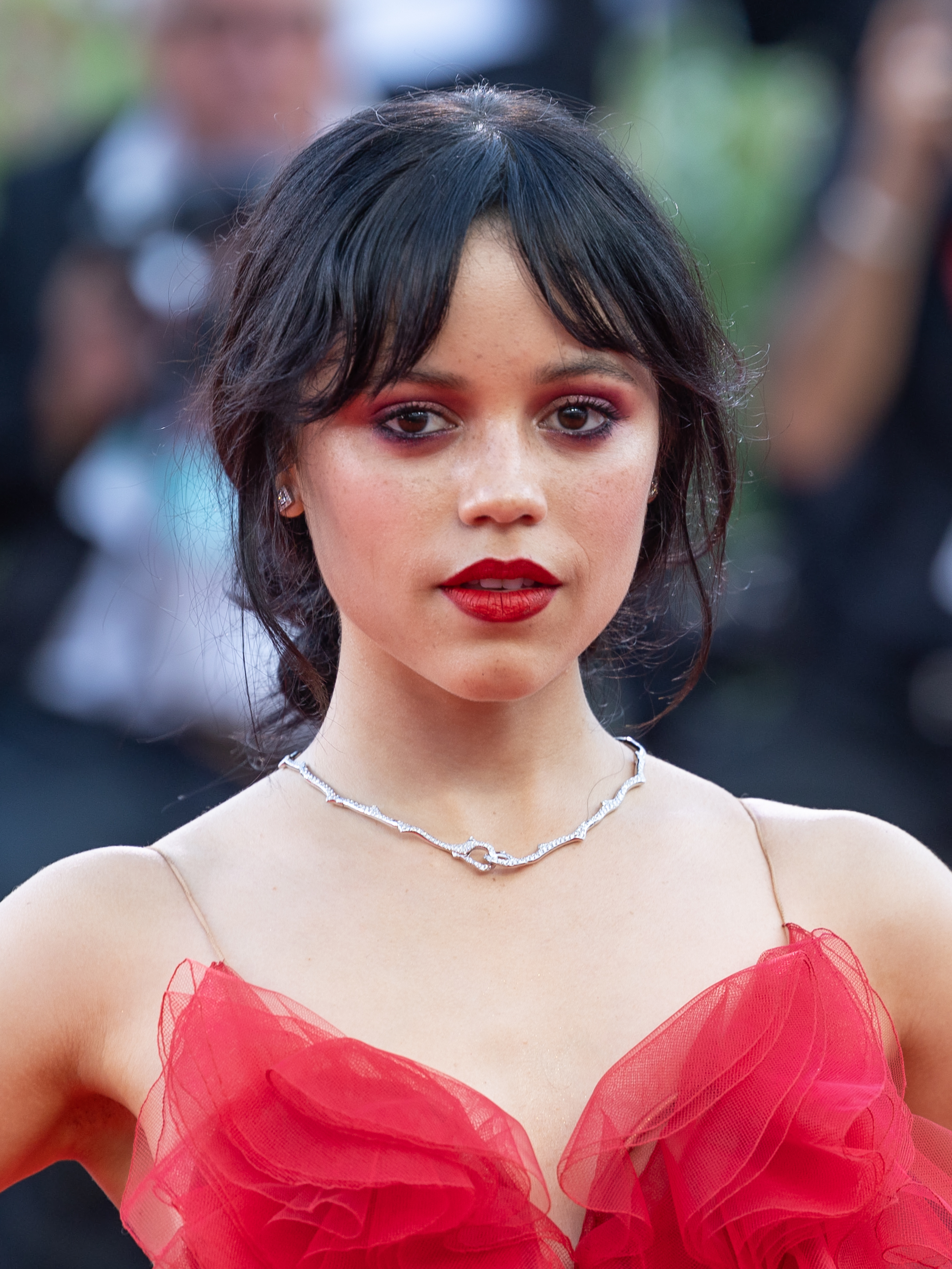
Jenna Ortega, Best Performance by a Younger Actor in a Television Series winner

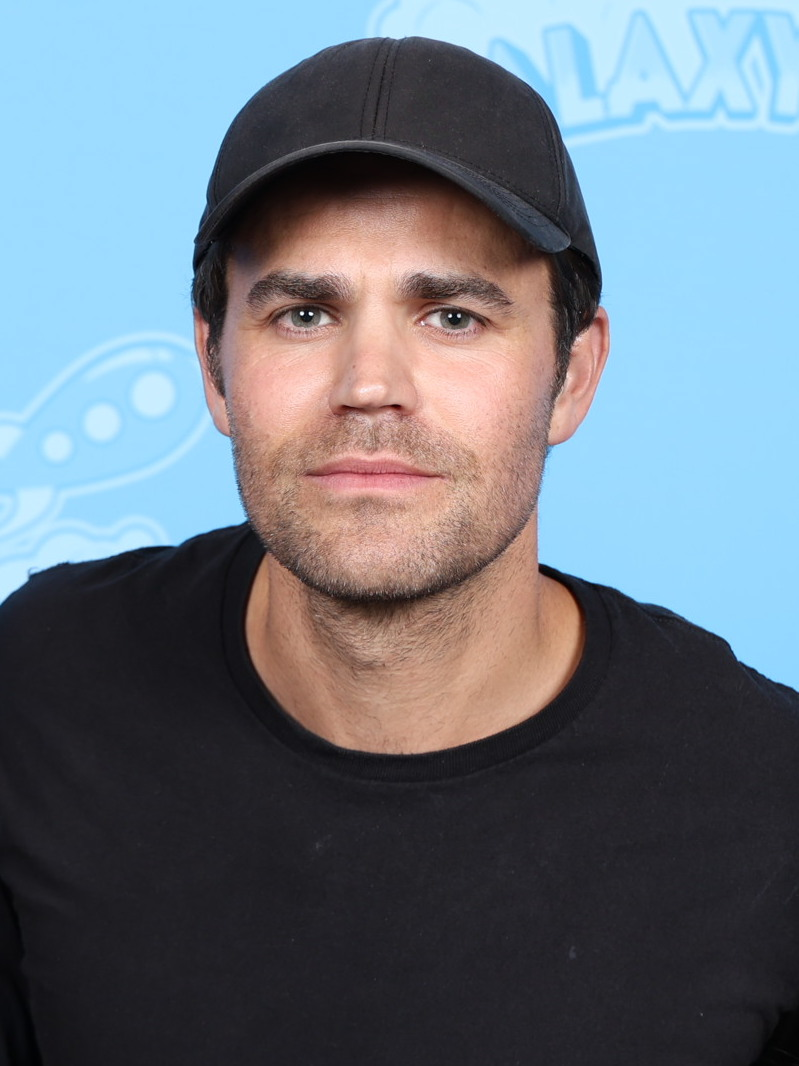
Paul Wesley, Best Guest Star in a Television Series winner

Best Actor in a Television Series	Best Actress in a Television Series
Patrick Stewart – Star Trek: Picard (Paramount+) as Jean-Luc Picard; Sam Heughan – Outlander (Starz) as Jamie Fraser; Tyler Hoechlin – Superman & Lois (The CW) as Clark Kent / Superman; Diego Luna – Andor (Disney+) as Cassian Andor; Anson Mount – Star Trek: Strange New Worlds (Paramount+) as Christopher Pike; Pedro Pascal – The Last of Us (HBO / Max) as Joel Miller; Harold Perrineau – From (MGM+) as Boyd Stevens	Caitríona Balfe – Outlander (Starz) as Claire Fraser; Lauren Cohan – The Walking Dead: Dead City (AMC) as Maggie Rhee; Emma D'Arcy – House of the Dragon (HBO / Max) as Princess / Queen Rhaenyra Targaryen; Rebecca Ferguson – Silo (Apple TV+) as Juliette Nichols; Tatiana Maslany – She-Hulk: Attorney at Law (Disney+) as Jennifer Walters / She-Hulk; Rose McIver – Ghosts (CBS) as Samantha "Sam" Arondekar; Elizabeth Tulloch – Superman & Lois (The CW) as Lois Lane
Best Supporting Actor in a Television Series	Best Supporting Actress in a Television Series
Jonathan Frakes – Star Trek: Picard (Paramount+) as Captain William Riker; Harvey Guillén – What We Do in the Shadows (FX / Hulu) as Guillermo de la Cruz; Ernie Hudson – Quantum Leap (NBC) as Herbert "Magic" Williams; Ethan Peck – Star Trek: Strange New Worlds (Paramount+) as Spock; Matt Smith – House of the Dragon (HBO / Max) as Prince Daemon Targaryen; Ed Speleers – Star Trek: Picard (Paramount+) as Jack Crusher; Todd Stashwick – Star Trek: Picard (Paramount+) as Captain Liam Shaw	Jeri Ryan – Star Trek: Picard (Paramount+) as Seven of Nine; Jess Bush – Star Trek: Strange New Worlds (Paramount+) as Christine Chapel; Celia Rose Gooding – Star Trek: Strange New Worlds (Paramount+) as Nyota Uhura; Genevieve O'Reilly – Andor (Disney+) as Mon Mothma; Katee Sackhoff – The Mandalorian (Disney+) as Bo-Katan Kryze; Sophie Skelton – Outlander (Starz) as Brianna "Bree" Randall Fraser; Rebecca Wisocky – Ghosts (CBS) as Henrietta "Hetty" Woodstone
Best Performance by a Younger Actor in a Television Series	Best Guest Star in a Television Series
Jenna Ortega – Wednesday (Netflix) as Wednesday Addams; Milly Alcock – House of the Dragon (HBO / Max) as Young Princess Rhaenyra Targaryen; Freya Allan – The Witcher (Netflix) as Ciri; Zackary Arthur – Chucky (Syfy / USA Network) as Jake Wheeler; Brec Bassinger – Stargirl (The CW) as Courtney Whitmore / Stargirl; Bella Ramsey – The Last of Us (HBO / Max) as Ellie; Igby Rigney – The Midnight Club (Netflix) as Kevin	Paul Wesley – Star Trek: Strange New Worlds (Paramount+) as Captain James T. Kirk; Gael García Bernal – Werewolf by Night (Disney+) as Jack Russell / Werewolf by Night; Giancarlo Esposito – The Mandalorian (Disney+) as Moff Gideon; Nick Offerman – The Last of Us (HBO / Max) as Bill; Amanda Plummer – Star Trek: Picard (Paramount+) as Captain Vadic; Andy Serkis – Andor (Disney+) as Kino Loy; Catherine Zeta-Jones – Wednesday (Netflix) as Morticia Addams

=== Home Entertainment ===
Best 4K Home Media Release	Best Classic Film Home Media Release
John Wick: Chapter 4 (Lionsgate); The Adventures of Baron Munchausen (Criterion); Cujo (Kino Lorber); The Exorcist: 50th Anniversary Edition (Warner Bros.); Needful Things (Kino Lorber); Star Trek: The Motion Picture – The Director's Edition (Paramount); To Live and Die in L.A. (Kino Lorber)	Invaders from Mars [4K] (Ignite); Attack of the 50 Foot Woman (Warner Archives); It Came from Outer Space [4K] (Universal); It! The Terror from Beyond Space [4K] (Kino Lorber); The Manchurian Candidate [4K] (Kino Lorber); The Night of the Hunter [4K] (Kino Lorber); Secret of the Incas (Kino Lorber)
Best Film Home Media Collection Release	Best Television Home Media Release
Superman: 5-Film Collection (1978 – 1987) [4K Ultra HD + Blu-ray] (Warner Bros.); Arsène Lupin Collection (Kino Lorber); Irwin Allen: Master of Disaster Collection (Shout! Factory); Mr. Wong Collection (Kino Lorber); Shawscope: Volume Two (Arrow Video); Universal Classic Monsters: Icons of Horror, Volume 2 [4K Ultra HD + Blu-ray] (Universal); Warner Bros. 100th Anniversary 25-Film Collection: Volume Four (Thrillers, Sci-Fi & Horror) (Warner Bros.)	Night Gallery (Season 3) (Kino Lorber); Anne Rice's Interview with the Vampire (Season 1) (AMC); Better Call Saul (The Complete Collection) (AMC); Creepshow (Season 3) (RLJ Entertainment); Doctor Who: The Abominable Snowman (BBC); Loki (Season 1) – 4K Steelbook (Disney Home Media); Quantum Leap (Season 1) (Universal)

=== Special Achievement Awards ===
- Life Career Award – Jodie Foster
- Visionary Award – Christopher Nolan
- George Pal Memorial Award – Dave Filoni
- Lance Reddick Legacy Award – Keanu Reeves
- Robert Forster Artist's Award – Seth MacFarlane
- Dan Curtis Legacy Award – The Walking Dead franchise
- Lifetime Achievement Award – The Cast of Star Trek: The Next Generation (Note: "The Lifetime Achievement Award is usually presented to an individual for their contributions to genre entertainment. Top luminaries like Stan Lee and Leonard Nimoy, Mr. Spock himself, have received this top honor. It's not new, but we extended this award to cover the entire cast of Star Trek: The Next Generation, due to its continued influence on the face of general television. It was originally doomed to failure since it was following in the footsteps of the original Star Trek, yet it carved its own identity, and its diverse cast was light years ahead of its time!" —Academy of Science Fiction, Fantasy and Horror Films)

== Multiple nominations ==
Film
Nominations	Film	Genre	Distributor
12	Avatar: The Way of Water	Science Fiction	Disney
11	Oppenheimer	Thriller	Universal
9	Indiana Jones and the Dial of Destiny	Fantasy	Disney
8	Barbie	Fantasy	Warner Bros.
7	Guardians of the Galaxy Vol. 3	Superhero	Disney
5	John Wick: Chapter 4	Action / Adventure	Lionsgate
5	The Menu	Thriller	Searchlight Pictures
5	Renfield	Horror	Universal
4	The Little Mermaid	Fantasy	Disney
4	Mission: Impossible – Dead Reckoning Part One	Action / Adventure	Paramount
3	Black Panther: Wakanda Forever	Superhero	Disney
3	Jules	Science Fiction	Bleecker Street
3	Pearl	Horror	A24
3	Prey	Science Fiction	Hulu
3	Talk to Me	Horror	A24
2	Blue Beetle	Superhero	Warner Bros.
2	The Creator	Science Fiction	20th Century Studios
2	Evil Dead Rise	Horror	Warner Bros.
2	Fast X	Action / Adventure	Universal
2	The Flash	Superhero	Warner Bros.
2	M3GAN	Science Fiction	Universal
2	Spider-Man: Across the Spider-Verse	Animation	Sony
2	The Tutor	Thriller	Vertical Entertainment
2	The Woman King	Action / Adventure	TriStar

Television
Nominations	Series	Genre	Network(s)
7	Star Trek: Picard	Science Fiction	Paramount+
6	Star Trek: Strange New Worlds	Science Fiction	Paramount+
5	Andor	Science Fiction	Disney+
5	The Last of Us	Horror	HBO / Max
4	House of the Dragon	Fantasy	HBO / Max
4	Outlander	Action / Adventure / Thriller	Starz
4	Wednesday	Fantasy	Netflix
3	Ghosts	Fantasy	CBS
3	The Mandalorian	Science Fiction	Disney+
3	Quantum Leap	Action / Adventure / Thriller	NBC
3	Silo	Science Fiction	Apple TV+
3	Superman & Lois	Superhero	The CW
2	Anne Rice's Interview with the Vampire	Horror	AMC
2	Chucky	Horror	Syfy; USA Network
2	From	Horror	MGM+
2	The Lord of the Rings: The Rings of Power	Fantasy	Prime Video
2	The Midnight Club	Horror	Netflix
2	She-Hulk: Attorney at Law	Superhero	Disney+
2	Stargirl	Superhero	The CW
2	The Walking Dead: Dead City	Horror	AMC
2	Werewolf by Night	Superhero	Disney+
2	What We Do in the Shadows	Horror	FX / Hulu
2	The Witcher	Fantasy	Netflix

== Multiple wins ==
Film
Wins	Film	Genre	Distributor
4	Avatar: The Way of Water	Science Fiction	Disney
3	Barbie	Fantasy	Warner Bros.
3	Indiana Jones and the Dial of Destiny	Fantasy	Disney
3	Oppenheimer	Thriller	Universal

Television
Wins	Series	Genre	Network
4	Star Trek: Picard	Science Fiction	Paramount+
2	Outlander	Action / Adventure / Thriller	Starz
2	Wednesday	Fantasy	Netflix
