= Saturn Award for Best Youth-Oriented Television Series =

Former annual US media award

The following is a list of Saturn Award winners for Best Youth-Oriented Television Series.

The award was presented annually by the Academy of Science Fiction, Fantasy and Horror Films, honoring the work of television series in science fiction, fantasy, and horror fiction, particularly those aimed at a younger audience. It was created in 2011, and discontinued in 2015 when the Saturn Award went through major changes in their television categories.

Teen Wolf won the award three times, with The 100 winning once. Teen Wolf and The Vampire Diaries hold the record for the most nominations, receiving a nomination for each of the four years it was awarded.

(NOTE: Year refers to year of eligibility, the actual ceremonies are held the following year)

The winners are listed in bold.

== Winners and nominees ==
Year	TV Series
2011 **(38th)**	**Teen Wolf**
2011 **(38th)**	Being Human
2011 **(38th)**	Doctor Who
2011 **(38th)**	The Nine Lives of Chloe King
2011 **(38th)**	The Secret Circle
2011 **(38th)**	The Vampire Diaries
2012 **(39th)**	**Teen Wolf**
2012 **(39th)**	Arrow
2012 **(39th)**	Beauty & the Beast
2012 **(39th)**	Doctor Who
2012 **(39th)**	Merlin
2012 **(39th)**	The Vampire Diaries
2013 **(40th)**	**Teen Wolf**
2013 **(40th)**	Arrow
2013 **(40th)**	Pretty Little Liars
2013 **(40th)**	Supernatural
2013 **(40th)**	The Tomorrow People
2013 **(40th)**	The Vampire Diaries
2014 **(41st)**	**The 100**
2014 **(41st)**	Doctor Who
2014 **(41st)**	Pretty Little Liars
2014 **(41st)**	Supernatural
2014 **(41st)**	Teen Wolf
2014 **(41st)**	The Vampire Diaries

== Multiple wins ==
3 awards

- Teen Wolf (consecutive)

== See also ==
- Saturn Award for Best Action-Thriller Television Series
- Saturn Award for Best Fantasy Television Series
- Saturn Award for Best Horror Television Series
- Saturn Award for Best Network Television Series
- Saturn Award for Best Science Fiction Television Series
- Saturn Award for Best Superhero Television Series
- Saturn Award for Best Syndicated/Cable Television Series
