= 42nd Saturn Awards =

US film and television award ceremony

- Date: June 22, 2016
- Site: Burbank, California, U.S.
- Hosted by: John Barrowman

Highlights
- Most awards: Star Wars: The Force Awakens (8)
- Most nominations: Star Wars: The Force Awakens (15)

The 42nd Saturn Awards, presented by the Academy of Science Fiction, Fantasy and Horror Films and honoring the best in science fiction, fantasy, horror, and other genres in film, television, home entertainment, and local theatre in 2015 and early 2016, were held on June 22, 2016, in Burbank, California, and hosted by actor John Barrowman. Nominations were announced on February 24, 2016. This ceremony featured several major changes on the television side, with all "Best Television Series" categories being replaced by new ones, with the exception of Best Superhero Adaptation Television Series.

Star Wars: The Force Awakens became the most nominated film in Saturn Award history, (Note: Star Wars (1977) was originally nominated for 11 awards and won 13 (7 competitive, 6 special) in 1978, and later won two more in 1997 and 2005, respectively. The actual number of wins include individual special awards to reward its art direction, cinematography, editing, music, set decoration, sound, and 20th anniversary; plus 1 competitive win as part of a compilation—Best DVD Movie Collection—for Star Wars Trilogy (2004) in 2005. The actual number of nominations also include two nominations as part of compilations, while the seven special awards were non-competitive, so they do not count as nominations.) with nominations in all 13 categories it was eligible for (except Best Performance by a Younger Actor). With double nominations for both Best Actor (John Boyega and Harrison Ford) and Best Supporting Actress (Carrie Fisher and Lupita Nyong'o), The Force Awakens received a total of fifteen nominations, followed by Mad Max: Fury Road with ten (including a nomination in a "Home Entertainment" category) and Crimson Peak with nine. The Walking Dead led the nominations for television for the second year in a row with seven, including triple nominations for Best Supporting Actress on Television (Tovah Feldshuh, Danai Gurira, and Melissa McBride); Game of Thrones and Hannibal followed with five nominations each.

For film, Star Wars: The Force Awakens won the most awards with eight, including Best Science Fiction Film, Best Actor for Harrison Ford, and John Williams' eighth win for Best Music, with Crimson Peak being the only other film to score multiple wins with three, including Best Horror Film. For television, The Walking Dead won the most awards for the second year in a row with three wins, including the inaugural Best Horror Television Series and Chandler Riggs becoming the first individual to win Best Performance by a Younger Actor on Television twice; Hannibal and Outlander followed with two wins each.

Additionally, eight individuals earned double nominations: J. J. Abrams, Guillermo del Toro, Alex Garland, George Miller, and Colin Trevorrow were all nominated for both Best Director and Best Writing, with only Abrams winning for writing, while Neal Scanlan received nominations for both Best Make-up and Best Special Effects for The Force Awakens, winning both. Lastly, both Gillian Anderson and Jessica Chastain were the only acting nominees to receive two nominations for different works, with only the latter winning one: Best Supporting Actress for Crimson Peak.

== Overview ==
=== Film ===
Star Wars: The Force Awakens won eight awards, tying The Lord of the Rings: The Return of the King (2003) as the second most award-winning film at the Saturn Awards, behind Avatar (2009), which won ten awards at the 36th Saturn Awards in 2010. The Force Awakens' wins were for Best Science Fiction Film, Best Actor for Harrison Ford, Best Supporting Actor for Adam Driver, Best Writing (Lawrence Kasdan, J. J. Abrams, and Michael Arndt), Best Editing, Best Make-up, Best Music, and Best Special Effects.

This was only the second time a trio won Best Writing: Kasdan had already won the award for Raiders of the Lost Ark (1981) and had received nominations for two other Star Wars films: The Empire Strikes Back (1980) and Return of the Jedi (1983). It was also the first win in the category for both Abrams and Arndt, who had both been nominated once before; Abrams had also won Best Director four years earlier for Super 8 (2011) and would go on to win five years later for Star Wars: The Rise of Skywalker (2019). Ford had previously won Best Actor for Raiders and had already been nominated for playing his Star Wars character, Han Solo, at the 5th Saturn Awards in 1978.

Crimson Peak was the only other film to secure multiple wins: Best Horror Film, Best Supporting Actress for Jessica Chastain, and Best Production Design. This was Chastain's first win and fifth nomination, including her Best Actress nomination the same year for The Martian.

Eleven features won a single award: Ant-Man, Bridge of Spies, Cinderella, Furious 7, Inside Out, Room, and Turbo Kid won the other "Best Film" categories. Furthermore, The Martian won Best Director (Ridley Scott's first win since Alien at the 7th Saturn Awards in 1980), Mad Max: Fury Road won Best Actress for Charlize Theron (her first win and fifth nomination), Jurassic World won Best Performance by a Younger Actor for Ty Simpkins, and Avengers: Age of Ultron won Best Costume Design (Alexandra Byrne's second win).

=== Television ===
This year, the Saturn Awards introduced several new "Best Television Series" categories, replacing older ones: the fourth and final season of Continuum won the inaugural Best Science Fiction Television Series, winning its first and only Saturn Award after ten nominations overall. The second half of Outlander's first season (the first half having been aired the previous year) won the inaugural Best Fantasy Television Series, with its lead actress Caitríona Balfe winning Best Actress on Television for the second year in a row; Balfe would go on to win a third in 2021.

The Walking Dead, which had won the "Best Television Series" award it was nominated for all of its previous seasons (Best Television Presentation in 2011 and 2012, and Best Syndicated/Cable Television Series in 2013, 2014, and 2015), continued its long winning streak by winning the inaugural Best Horror Television Series. The series also won Best Supporting Actress in Television for Danai Gurira, while Chandler Riggs became the first performer to win Best Performance by a Younger Actor on Television twice; Riggs would go on to win a third in 2018, surpassing his own record. Hannibal concluded its own winning streak by winning Best Action / Thriller Television Series for its third and final season, after winning Best Network Television Series in 2014 and 2015. Its guest star Richard Armitage won Best Supporting Actor on Television, a year after winning Best Supporting Actor in a Film for The Hobbit: The Battle of the Five Armies.

The Flash won Best Superhero Adaptation Television Series, its second win in the same category, after winning the inaugural award the previous year, while Daredevil won the inaugural Best New Media Television Series.

Other award-winning programs were Haven winning Best Guest Starring Role on Television for William Shatner (his second win after Best Actor in a Film for Star Trek II: The Wrath of Khan at the 10th Saturn Awards in 1983), and Doctor Who, which won Best Television Presentation for its Christmas special "The Husbands of River Song". Although it is the first win in the category for the series itself, the eponymous 1996 film, which is a part of a common chronology, had won as well. Lastly, Ash vs Evil Dead won Best Actor on Television for Bruce Campbell, making it the third installment of the Evil Dead franchise to win a Saturn Award after The Evil Dead (1981) and Army of Darkness (1992).

== Winners and nominees ==
=== Film ===
Best Science Fiction Film	Best Fantasy Film
Star Wars: The Force Awakens; Ex Machina; Jurassic World; Mad Max: Fury Road; The Martian; Terminator Genisys	Cinderella; The Age of Adaline; Baahubali: The Beginning; Goosebumps; The Hunger Games: Mockingjay – Part 2; Ted 2
Best Horror Film	Best Thriller Film
Crimson Peak; Insidious: Chapter 3; It Follows; Krampus; The Visit; What We Do in the Shadows	Bridge of Spies; Black Mass; The Gift; The Hateful Eight; Mr. Holmes; Sicario
Best Action / Adventure Film	Best International Film
Furious 7; Everest; Mission: Impossible – Rogue Nation; The Revenant; Spectre; Spy	Turbo Kid; Goodnight Mommy; The Hundred-Year-Old Man Who Climbed Out of the Window and Disappeared; Labyrinth of Lies; Legend; The Wave
Best Comic-to-Film Motion Picture	Best Animated Film
Ant-Man; Attack on Titan – Part 1; Avengers: Age of Ultron; Kingsman: The Secret Service; The Peanuts Movie	Inside Out; Anomalisa; The Good Dinosaur; Kung Fu Panda 3; Minions; When Marnie Was There
Best Director	Best Writing
Ridley Scott – The Martian; J. J. Abrams – Star Wars: The Force Awakens; Guillermo del Toro – Crimson Peak; Alex Garland – Ex Machina; George Miller – Mad Max: Fury Road; Peyton Reed – Ant-Man; Colin Trevorrow – Jurassic World	Lawrence Kasdan, J. J. Abrams, and Michael Arndt – Star Wars: The Force Awakens; Guillermo del Toro and Matthew Robbins – Crimson Peak; Alex Garland – Ex Machina; Drew Goddard – The Martian; Jane Goldman and Matthew Vaughn – Kingsman: The Secret Service; Rick Jaffa, Amanda Silver, Derek Connolly, and Colin Trevorrow – Jurassic World; George Miller, Brendan McCarthy, and Nico Lathouris – Mad Max: Fury Road
Best Actor	Best Actress
Harrison Ford – Star Wars: The Force Awakens as Han Solo; John Boyega – Star Wars: The Force Awakens as Finn; Matt Damon – The Martian as Mark Watney; Leonardo DiCaprio – The Revenant as Hugh Glass; Taron Egerton – Kingsman: The Secret Service as Gary "Eggsy" Unwin; Domhnall Gleeson – Ex Machina as Caleb Smith; Samuel L. Jackson – The Hateful Eight as Major Marquis Warren; Paul Rudd – Ant-Man as Scott Lang / Ant-Man	Charlize Theron – Mad Max: Fury Road as Imperator Furiosa; Emily Blunt – Sicario as Kate Macer; Jessica Chastain – The Martian as Melissa Lewis; Blake Lively – The Age of Adaline as Adaline Bowman; Daisy Ridley – Star Wars: The Force Awakens as Rey; Mia Wasikowska – Crimson Peak as Edith Cushing
Best Supporting Actor	Best Supporting Actress
Adam Driver – Star Wars: The Force Awakens as Kylo Ren; Paul Bettany – Avengers: Age of Ultron as J.A.R.V.I.S. / Vision; Michael Douglas – Ant-Man as Dr. Hank Pym; Walton Goggins – The Hateful Eight as Sheriff Chris Mannix; Simon Pegg – Mission: Impossible – Rogue Nation as Benji Dunn; Michael Shannon – 99 Homes as Rick Carver	Jessica Chastain – Crimson Peak as Lady Lucille Sharpe; Carrie Fisher – Star Wars: The Force Awakens as General Leia Organa; Evangeline Lilly – Ant-Man as Hope van Dyne; Lupita Nyong'o – Star Wars: The Force Awakens as Maz Kanata; Tamannaah Bhatia – Baahubali: The Beginning as Avanthika; Alicia Vikander – Ex Machina as Ava
Best Performance by a Younger Actor	Best Music
Ty Simpkins – Jurassic World as Gray Mitchell; Olivia DeJonge – The Visit as Becca; James Freedson-Jackson – Cop Car as Travis; Milo Parker – Mr. Holmes as Roger; Elias Schwarz and Lukas Schwarz – Goodnight Mommy as Elias and Lukas; Jacob Tremblay – Room as Jack Newsome	John Williams – Star Wars: The Force Awakens; Tom Holkenborg – Mad Max: Fury Road; Jóhann Jóhannsson – Sicario; M. M. Keeravani – Baahubali: The Beginning; Ennio Morricone – The Hateful Eight; Fernando Velázquez – Crimson Peak
Best Editing	Best Production Design
Star Wars: The Force Awakens – Maryann Brandon and Mary Jo Markey; Ant-Man – Dan Lebental and Colby Parker Jr.; Furious 7 – Christian Wagner, Dylan Highsmith, Kirk Morri, and Leigh Folsom Boyd; Jurassic World – Kevin Stitt; Kingsman: The Secret Service – Eddie Hamilton and Jon Harris; Mad Max: Fury Road – Margaret Sixel	Crimson Peak – Thomas E. Sanders; Baahubali: The Beginning – Sabu Cyril; Jurassic World – Ed Verreaux; Mad Max: Fury Road – Colin Gibson; Star Wars: The Force Awakens – Rick Carter and Darren Gilford; Tomorrowland – Scott Chambliss
Best Costume Design	Best Make-up
Avengers: Age of Ultron – Alexandra Byrne; Baahubali: The Beginning – Rama Rajamouli and Prashanti Tipirneni; Cinderella – Sandy Powell; Crimson Peak – Kate Hawley; Kingsman: The Secret Service – Arianne Phillips; Star Wars: The Force Awakens – Michael Kaplan	Star Wars: The Force Awakens – Neal Scanlan; Black Mass – Joel Harlow and Kenny Niederbaumer; Crimson Peak – David Martí, Montse Ribé, and Xavi Bastida; The Hateful Eight – Greg Nicotero, Howard Berger, and Heba Thorisdottir; Mad Max: Fury Road – Damian Martin and Nadine Prigge; Sicario – Donald Mowat
Best Special Effects	Best Independent Film
Star Wars: The Force Awakens – Roger Guyett, Patrick Tubach, Neal Scanlan, and Chris Corbould; Avengers: Age of Ultron – Paul Corbould, Christopher Townsend, Ben Snow, and Paul Butterworth; Ex Machina – Andrew Whitehurst, Paul Norris, Mark Williams Ardington, and Sara Bennett; Jurassic World – John Rosengrant, Michael Lantieri, and Tim Alexander; Mad Max: Fury Road – Andrew Jackson, Tom Wood, Dan Oliver, and Andy Williams; The Martian – Richard Stammers, Anders Langlands, Chris Lawrence, and Steven Warner	Room; 99 Homes; Bone Tomahawk; Cop Car; Experimenter; Trumbo

=== Television ===
==== Programs ====
Best Science Fiction Television Series	Best Fantasy Television Series
Continuum (Syfy); The 100 (The CW); Colony (USA Network); Doctor Who (BBC America); The Expanse (Syfy); Wayward Pines (Fox); The X-Files (Fox)	Outlander (Starz); Game of Thrones (HBO); Haven (Syfy); Jonathan Strange & Mr Norrell (BBC America); The Magicians (Syfy); The Muppets (ABC); The Shannara Chronicles (MTV)
Best Horror Television Series	Best Action / Thriller Television Series
The Walking Dead (AMC); American Horror Story: Hotel (FX); Ash vs Evil Dead (Starz); Fear the Walking Dead (AMC); Salem (WGN America); The Strain (FX); Teen Wolf (MTV)	Hannibal (NBC); Bates Motel (A&E); Blindspot (NBC); Fargo (FX); The Last Ship (TNT); The Librarians (TNT); Mr. Robot (USA Network)
Best Superhero Adaptation Television Series	Best New Media Television Series
The Flash (The CW); Agent Carter (ABC); Agents of S.H.I.E.L.D. (ABC); Arrow (The CW); Gotham (Fox); Legends of Tomorrow (The CW); Supergirl (CBS)	Daredevil (Netflix); Bosch (Amazon); DreamWorks Dragons (Netflix); Jessica Jones (Netflix); The Man in the High Castle (Amazon); Powers (PlayStation Network); Sense8 (Netflix)
Best Television Presentation
Doctor Who: The Husbands of River Song (BBC America); The Cannibal in the Jungle (Animal Planet); Childhood's End (Syfy); Sharknado 3: Oh Hell No! (Syfy); Turkey Hollow (Lifetime); The Wiz Live! (NBC)

==== Acting ====
Best Actor on Television	Best Actress on Television
Bruce Campbell – Ash vs Evil Dead (Starz) as Ash Williams; Charlie Cox – Daredevil (Netflix) as Matt Murdock / Daredevil; Matt Dillon – Wayward Pines (Fox) as Ethan Burke; David Duchovny – The X-Files (Fox) as Fox Mulder; Grant Gustin – The Flash (The CW) as Barry Allen / The Flash; Sam Heughan – Outlander (Starz) as James "Jamie" Fraser; Andrew Lincoln – The Walking Dead (AMC) as Rick Grimes; Mads Mikkelsen – Hannibal (NBC) as Dr. Hannibal Lecter	Caitríona Balfe – Outlander (Starz) as Claire Fraser; Gillian Anderson – The X-Files (Fox) as Dana Scully; Melissa Benoist – Supergirl (CBS) as Kara Danvers / Supergirl; Kim Dickens – Fear the Walking Dead (AMC) as Madison Clark; Rachel Nichols – Continuum (Syfy) as Kiera Cameron; Krysten Ritter – Jessica Jones (Netflix) as Jessica Jones; Rebecca Romijn – The Librarians (TNT) as Colonel Eve Baird
Best Supporting Actor on Television	Best Supporting Actress on Television
Richard Armitage – Hannibal (NBC) as Francis Dolarhyde; Vincent D'Onofrio – Daredevil (Netflix) as Wilson Fisk / Kingpin; Kit Harington – Game of Thrones (HBO) as Jon Snow; Toby Jones – Wayward Pines (Fox) as David Pilcher / Dr. Jenkins; Erik Knudsen – Continuum (Syfy) as Alec Sadler; Lance Reddick – Bosch (Amazon) as Deputy Chief Irvin Irving; David Tennant – Jessica Jones (Netflix) as Kilgrave; Patrick Wilson – Fargo (FX) as Lou Solverson	Danai Gurira – The Walking Dead (AMC) as Michonne; Gillian Anderson – Hannibal (NBC) as Dr. Bedelia Du Maurier; Tovah Feldshuh – The Walking Dead (AMC) as Deanna Monroe; Calista Flockhart – Supergirl (CBS) as Cat Grant; Lena Headey – Game of Thrones (HBO) as Cersei Lannister; Melissa Leo – Wayward Pines (Fox) as Nurse Pamela "Pam" Pilcher; Melissa McBride – The Walking Dead (AMC) as Carol Peletier
Best Guest Star on Television	Best Performance by a Younger Actor on Television
William Shatner – Haven (Syfy) as Croatoan; Laura Benanti – Supergirl (CBS) as Alura In-Ze / General Astra; Steven Brand – Teen Wolf (MTV) as Dr. Gabriel Valack; Victor Garber – The Flash (The CW) as Dr. Martin Stein; Scott Glenn – Daredevil (Netflix) as Stick; Alex Kingston – Doctor Who: The Husbands of River Song (BBC America) as River Song; John Carroll Lynch – The Walking Dead (AMC) as Eastman	Chandler Riggs – The Walking Dead (AMC) as Carl Grimes; Max Charles – The Strain (FX) as Zach Goodweather; Frank Dillane – Fear the Walking Dead (AMC) as Nick Clark; Jodelle Ferland – Dark Matter (Syfy) as Five; Brenock O'Connor – Game of Thrones (HBO) as Olly; Dylan Sprayberry – Teen Wolf (MTV) as Liam Dunbar; Maisie Williams – Game of Thrones (HBO) as Arya Stark

=== Home Entertainment ===
Best DVD or Blu-ray Release	Best DVD or Blu-ray Classic Film Release
Burying the Ex; Big Game; The Cobbler; Monsters: Dark Continent; The Tale of the Princess Kaguya; Wolf Totem	Miracle Mile; Burnt Offerings; Cemetery Without Crosses; Ladyhawke; The Monster That Challenged the World; Tales of Terror; X: The Man with the X-ray Eyes
Best DVD or Blu-ray Special Edition Release	Best DVD or Blu-ray Television Release
X-Men: Days of Future Past: The Rogue Cut; Furious 7 (Extended Edition); The Hobbit: The Battle of the Five Armies (Extended Edition); Society (Limited Edition); Vanilla Sky (Alternate Ending)	The X-Files (The Collector's Set); Black Sails (Season 2); From Dusk till Dawn: The Series (Season 2); Hannibal (Season 3); Lost in Space (The Complete Adventures); My Favorite Martian (The Complete Series)
Best DVD or Blu-ray Collection Release
The Frank Darabont Collection (The Shawshank Redemption, The Green Mile, and The Majestic); Horror Classics: Volume One (The Mummy, Dracula Has Risen from the Grave, Taste the Blood of Dracula, and Frankenstein Must Be Destroyed); Jurassic Park Collection (Jurassic Park, The Lost World: Jurassic Park, Jurassic Park III, and Jurassic World); Mad Max Anthology (Mad Max, Mad Max 2, Mad Max Beyond Thunderdome, and Mad Max: Fury Road); Nikkatsu Diamond Guys: Volume 1 (Voice Without a Shadow, Red Quay, and The Rambling Guitarist); Special Effects Collection (Son of Kong, Mighty Joe Young, The Beast from 20,000 Fathoms, and Them!)

=== Local Stage Production ===
Best Local Stage Production
- Tarzan (3-D Theatricals)
  - An Act of God (Ahmanson Theatre)
  - Bent (The Mark Taper Forum)
  - Carrie: The Musical (La Mirada Theatre for the Performing Arts)
  - The Lion King (Segerstrom Center for the Performing Arts)
  - Side Show (3-D Theatricals)

=== Special Achievement Awards ===
- President's Award – Haven
- Spotlight Award – Better Call Saul
- Dan Curtis Legacy Award – Eric Kripke
- Special Recognition Award – Brannon Braga
- George Pal Memorial Award – Simon Kinberg
- Lifetime Achievement Award – Nichelle Nichols
- Breakthrough Performance Award – Melissa Benoist for Supergirl

== Multiple nominations and wins ==
=== Film ===
The following works received multiple nominations:

- 15 nominations: Star Wars: The Force Awakens
- 10 nominations: Mad Max: Fury Road
- 9 nominations: Crimson Peak
- 8 nominations: Jurassic World
- 6 nominations: Ant-Man, Ex Machina, The Martian
- 5 nominations: Baahubali: The Beginning, The Hateful Eight, Kingsman: The Secret Service
- 4 nominations: Avengers: Age of Ultron, Sicario
- 3 nominations: Furious 7
- 2 nominations: 99 Homes, The Age of Adaline, Black Mass, Cinderella, Cop Car, Goodnight Mommy, Mission: Impossible – Rogue Nation, Mr. Holmes, The Revenant, Room, The Visit

The following works received multiple wins:

- 8 wins: Star Wars: The Force Awakens
- 3 wins: Crimson Peak

=== Television ===
The following works received multiple nominations:

- 7 nominations: The Walking Dead
- 5 nominations: Game of Thrones, Hannibal
- 4 nominations: Daredevil, Supergirl, Wayward Pines, The X-Files
- 3 nominations: Continuum, Doctor Who, Fear the Walking Dead, The Flash, Jessica Jones, Outlander, Teen Wolf
- 2 nominations: Ash vs Evil Dead, Bosch, Fargo, Haven, The Librarians, The Strain

The following works received multiple wins:

- 3 wins: The Walking Dead
- 2 wins: Hannibal, Outlander
