= Saturn Award for Best Streaming Superhero Series =

Former annual US media award

Saturn Award for Best New Media Superhero Series
- Awarded for: Best superhero fiction streaming television series of the year
- Country: United States
- First award: 2018
- Currently held by: Daredevil (2019)
- Website: www.saturnawards.org

The Saturn Award for Best Streaming Superhero Series (formerly Saturn Award for Best New Media Superhero Series) was one of the annual awards given by the Academy of Science Fiction, Fantasy and Horror Films. The Saturn Awards, which are the oldest film and series-specialized awards to reward science fiction, fantasy, and horror achievements, included the category for the first time at the 44th Saturn Awards. It specifically rewards superhero fiction streaming television series created for non-traditional platforms such as Netflix, Amazon, and Hulu.

At the 45th Saturn Awards, the category was retitled.

== Winners and nominees ==
The winners are listed in bold.

(NOTE: Year refers to year of eligibility, the actual ceremonies are held the following year)

=== 2010s ===
Year	TV Series	Streaming Service
2017 **(44th)**	**The Punisher**	**Netflix**
2017 **(44th)**	The Defenders	Netflix
2017 **(44th)**	Future Man	Hulu
2017 **(44th)**	Iron Fist	Netflix
2017 **(44th)**	Runaways	Hulu
2017 **(44th)**	The Tick	Amazon Prime Video
2018/2019 **(45th)**	**Daredevil**	**Netflix**
2018/2019 **(45th)**	Doom Patrol	DC Universe
2018/2019 **(45th)**	Jessica Jones	Netflix
2018/2019 **(45th)**	The Punisher	Netflix
2018/2019 **(45th)**	Runaways	Hulu
2018/2019 **(45th)**	Swamp Thing	DC Universe
2018/2019 **(45th)**	The Umbrella Academy	Netflix

== See also ==
- Saturn Award for Best Superhero Television Series
- Saturn Award for Best New Media Television Series
