= Saturn Award for Best New Media Television Series =

Former annual US media award

- Awarded for: Best genre streaming television series of the year
- Country: United States
- Presented by: Academy of Science Fiction, Fantasy and Horror Films
- First award: 2016
- Currently held by: Star Trek: Discovery (2018)
- Website: www.saturnawards.org

The Saturn Award for Best New Media Television Series was one of the annual awards given by the Academy of Science Fiction, Fantasy and Horror Films. The Saturn Awards, which are the oldest film and series-specialized awards to reward science fiction, fantasy, and horror achievements, included the category for the first time at the 42nd Saturn Awards ceremony, when the Saturn Award went through major changes in their television categories. It specifically rewards streaming television series created for non-traditional platforms such as Netflix, Amazon, and Hulu. At the 45th Saturn Awards, it was discontinued to make room for the Saturn Awards for best streaming horror/thriller and science fiction/action/fantasy series, in addition to the award for best streaming superhero series.

(NOTE: Year refers to year of eligibility, the actual ceremonies are held the following year)

The winners are listed in bold.

== Winners and nominees ==
=== 2010s ===
Year	TV Series	Streaming Service
2015 **(42nd)**	**Daredevil**	**Netflix**
2015 **(42nd)**	Bosch	Amazon Prime Video
2015 **(42nd)**	DreamWorks Dragons	Netflix
2015 **(42nd)**	Jessica Jones	Netflix
2015 **(42nd)**	The Man in the High Castle	Prime Video
2015 **(42nd)**	Powers	PlayStation Network
2015 **(42nd)**	Sense8	Netflix
2016 **(43rd)**	**Luke Cage**	**Netflix**
2016 **(43rd)**	**Stranger Things**	**Netflix**
2016 **(43rd)**	Bosch	Amazon Prime Video
2016 **(43rd)**	Daredevil	Netflix
2016 **(43rd)**	The Man in the High Castle	Prime Video
2016 **(43rd)**	A Series of Unfortunate Events	Netflix
2017 **(44th)**	**Star Trek: Discovery**	**CBS All Access**
2017 **(44th)**	Altered Carbon	Netflix
2017 **(44th)**	Black Mirror	Netflix
2017 **(44th)**	Electric Dreams	Amazon Prime Video
2017 **(44th)**	The Handmaid's Tale	Hulu
2017 **(44th)**	Mindhunter	Netflix
2017 **(44th)**	Stranger Things	Netflix

== Most nominations ==
- 2 nominations – Bosch, Daredevil, The Man in the High Castle, Stranger Things

== See also ==
- Saturn Award for Best Streaming Horror & Thriller Series
- Saturn Award for Best Streaming Science Fiction, Action & Fantasy Series
- Saturn Award for Best Streaming Superhero Series
