= Saturn Award for Best Action-Thriller Television Series =

Annual US television award

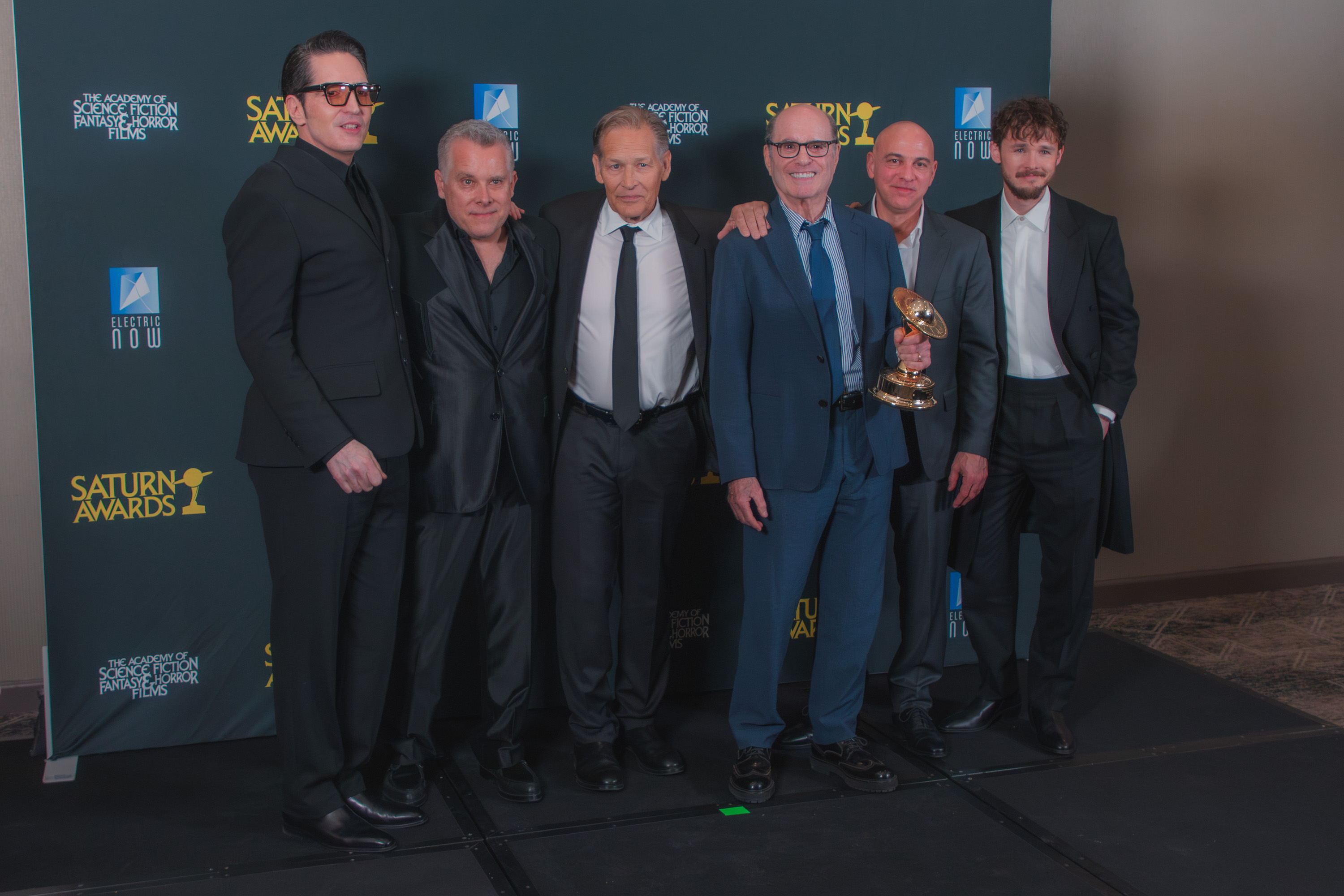
- The 2024/2025 recipients for Dexter: Resurrection
- Awarded for: Best television series of the year in the action and thriller genres.
- Country: United States
- Presented by: Academy of Science Fiction, Fantasy and Horror Films
- First award: 2016
- Currently held by: Dexter: Resurrection & Duster (2024/2025)
- Website: www.saturnawards.org

The Saturn Award for Best Action-Thriller Television Series is one of the annual awards given by the Academy of Science Fiction, Fantasy and Horror Films. The Saturn Awards, which are the oldest film and series-specialized awards to reward science fiction, fantasy, and horror achievements, included the category for the first time at the 42nd Saturn Awards ceremony, when the Saturn Award went through major changes in their television categories. It specifically rewards action and thriller on television. At the 50th Anniversary Saturn Awards, the category was split to recognize both network/cable series and streaming series however, the categories were merged again at the subsequent 51st Saturn Awards.

== Winners and nominees ==
The winners are listed in bold.

(NOTE: Year refers to year of eligibility, the actual ceremonies are held the following year)

=== 2010s ===
Year	TV Series	Network
2015 **(42nd)**	**Hannibal**	**NBC**
2015 **(42nd)**	Bates Motel	A&E
2015 **(42nd)**	Blindspot	NBC
2015 **(42nd)**	Fargo	FX
2015 **(42nd)**	The Last Ship	TNT
2015 **(42nd)**	The Librarians	TNT
2015 **(42nd)**	Mr. Robot	USA Network
2016 **(43rd)**	**Riverdale**	**The CW**
2016 **(43rd)**	Animal Kingdom	TNT
2016 **(43rd)**	Bates Motel	A&E
2016 **(43rd)**	Designated Survivor	ABC
2016 **(43rd)**	The Librarians	TNT
2016 **(43rd)**	Mr. Robot	USA Network
2016 **(43rd)**	Underground	WGN America
2017 **(44th)**	**Better Call Saul**	**AMC**
2017 **(44th)**	The Alienist	TNT
2017 **(44th)**	Animal Kingdom	TNT
2017 **(44th)**	Fargo	FX
2017 **(44th)**	Into the Badlands	AMC
2017 **(44th)**	Mr. Mercedes	Audience
2017 **(44th)**	Riverdale	The CW
2018/2019 **(45th)**	**Better Call Saul**	**AMC**
2018/2019 **(45th)**	Killing Eve	BBC America
2018/2019 **(45th)**	The Last Ship	TNT
2018/2019 **(45th)**	Mr. Mercedes	Audience
2018/2019 **(45th)**	The Purge	USA Network
2018/2019 **(45th)**	Riverdale	The CW
2018/2019 **(45th)**	The Sinner	USA Network
2019/2020 **(46th)**	**Better Call Saul**	**AMC**
2019/2020 **(46th)**	Castle Rock	Hulu
2019/2020 **(46th)**	Jack Ryan	Amazon Prime Video
2019/2020 **(46th)**	The Outpost	The CW
2019/2020 **(46th)**	Pennyworth	Epix
2019/2020 **(46th)**	Riverdale	The CW
2019/2020 **(46th)**	Snowpiercer	TNT

=== 2020s ===
Year	TV Series	Network
2021/2022 **(50th)**	Network / Cable	
2021/2022 **(50th)**	**Better Call Saul**	**AMC**
2021/2022 **(50th)**	Big Sky	ABC
2021/2022 **(50th)**	The Blacklist	NBC
2021/2022 **(50th)**	Dexter: New Blood	Showtime
2021/2022 **(50th)**	Dark Winds	AMC
2021/2022 **(50th)**	Outlander	Starz
2021/2022 **(50th)**	Yellowjackets	Showtime
2021/2022 **(50th)**	Streaming	
2021/2022 **(50th)**	**The Boys**	**Amazon Prime Video**
2021/2022 **(50th)**	Bosch: Legacy	Amazon Freevee
2021/2022 **(50th)**	Cobra Kai	Netflix
2021/2022 **(50th)**	Leverage: Redemption	Amazon Freevee
2021/2022 **(50th)**	Peacemaker	HBO Max
2021/2022 **(50th)**	Reacher	Amazon Prime Video
2021/2022 **(50th)**	The Umbrella Academy	Netflix
2022/2023 **(51st**)	**Outlander**	**Starz**
2022/2023 **(51st**)	La Brea	NBC
2022/2023 **(51st**)	Manifest	Netflix
2022/2023 **(51st**)	Quantum Leap	NBC
2022/2023 **(51st**)	Tom Clancy's Jack Ryan	Amazon Prime Video
2022/2023 **(51st**)	The Witcher	Netflix
2022/2023 **(51st**)	Yellowjackets	Showtime
2023/2024 **(52nd**)	**Monarch: Legacy of Monsters**	**Apple TV+**
2023/2024 **(52nd**)	La Brea	NBC
2023/2024 **(52nd**)	Mr. & Mrs. Smith	Amazon Prime Video
2023/2024 **(52nd**)	Reacher	Amazon Prime Video
2023/2024 **(52nd**)	Shōgun	FX
2023/2024 **(52nd**)	Sugar	Apple TV+
2024/2025 **(53rd)**	Best Action / Adventure Television Series	
2024/2025 **(53rd)**	**Duster**	**HBO Max**
2024/2025 **(53rd)**	Cobra Kai	Netflix
2024/2025 **(53rd)**	Paradise	Hulu
2024/2025 **(53rd)**	Reacher	Amazon Prime Video
2024/2025 **(53rd)**	Squid Game	Netflix
2024/2025 **(53rd)**	Twisted Metal	Peacock
2024/2025 **(53rd)**	Best Thriller Television Series	
2024/2025 **(53rd)**	**Dexter: Resurrection**	**Paramount+**
2024/2025 **(53rd)**	Dark Winds	AMC
2024/2025 **(53rd)**	The Lowdown	FX
2024/2025 **(53rd)**	MobLand	Paramount+
2024/2025 **(53rd)**	The Rainmaker	USA Network
2024/2025 **(53rd)**	Your Friends & Neighbors	Apple TV+

== Most nominations ==
- 4 nominations – Better Call Saul, Riverdale
- 2 nominations – Animal Kingdom, Bates Motel, Fargo, Jack Ryan, La Brea, The Last Ship, The Librarians, Mr. Mercedes, Mr. Robot, Outlander, Reacher, Yellowjackets

== Most wins ==
- 4 wins – Better Call Saul

== See also ==
- Saturn Award for Best Network Television Series
- Saturn Award for Best Syndicated/Cable Television Series
- Saturn Award for Best Youth-Oriented Television Series
- Saturn Award for Best Streaming Science Fiction, Action & Fantasy Series
