= Saturn Award for Best Actor in a Streaming Television Series =

Annual US television award

Saturn Award for Best Actor in Streaming Television Series
- Awarded for: Best performance of the year by a male in a leading role in a streaming presentation
- Country: United States
- Presented by: Academy of Science Fiction, Fantasy and Horror Films
- First award: 2018
- Website: www.saturnawards.org

The Saturn Award for Best Actor in a Streaming Television Series is one of the annual awards given by the American professional organization, the Academy of Science Fiction, Fantasy and Horror Films. The Saturn Awards are the oldest film-specialized awards to reward science fiction, fantasy, and horror achievements (the Hugo Award for Best Dramatic Presentation, awarded by the World Science Fiction Society who reward science fiction and fantasy in various media, is the oldest award for science fiction and fantasy films).

The award was introduced at the 45th Saturn Awards, honoring the best performances by actors in streaming presentations. It was not held at the 46th Saturn Awards but returned at the 50th Anniversary Saturn Awards under its current name.

== Nominees ==
| Year | Actor | Television Program | Streaming Service | Character |
|---|---|---|---|---|
| 2018/2019 (45th) | Henry Thomas | The Haunting of Hill House | Netflix | Hugh Crain |
| 2018/2019 (45th) | Penn Badgley | You | Netflix | Joe Goldberg |
| 2018/2019 (45th) | Jon Bernthal | The Punisher | Netflix | Frank Castle / Punisher |
| 2018/2019 (45th) | Charlie Cox | Daredevil | Netflix | Matt Murdock / Daredevil |
| 2018/2019 (45th) | Zac Efron | Extremely Wicked, Shockingly Evil and Vile | Netflix | Ted Bundy |
| 2018/2019 (45th) | John Krasinski | Jack Ryan | Amazon | Jack Ryan |
| 2018/2019 (45th) | David Tennant | Good Omens | Amazon | Crowley |
| 2019/2020 (46th) | Not presented | | | |
| 2021/2022 (50th) | Oscar Isaac | Moon Knight | Disney+ | Marc Spector/Moon Knight, Steven Grant/Mr. Knight, Jake Lockley |
| 2021/2022 (50th) | Tom Hiddleston | Loki | Disney+ | Loki Laufeyson |
| 2021/2022 (50th) | Anthony Mackie | The Falcon and the Winter Soldier | Disney+ | Sam Wilson/Falcon |
| 2021/2022 (50th) | Ewan McGregor | Obi-Wan Kenobi | Disney+ | Obi-Wan Kenobi |
| 2021/2022 (50th) | Anson Mount | Star Trek: Strange New Worlds | Paramount+ | Christopher Pike |
| 2021/2022 (50th) | Adam Scott | Severance | Apple TV+ | Mark Scout |
| 2021/2022 (50th) | Antony Starr | The Boys | Amazon Prime Video | Homelander |

== See also ==
- Saturn Award for Best Actor on Television
