= Saturn Award for Best Superhero Television Series =

Annual US television award

- Awarded for: Best television series of the year in superhero fiction
- Country: United States
- Presented by: Academy of Science Fiction, Fantasy and Horror Films
- First award: 2015
- Currently held by: Peacemaker (2024/2025)
- Website: www.saturnawards.org

The following is a list of Saturn Award winners for Best Superhero Television Series.

The award is presented annually by the Academy of Science Fiction, Fantasy and Horror Films, honoring the work of actresses in science fiction, fantasy, and horror fiction on television. It was introduced at the 41st Saturn Awards in 2015. It was absent at the 50th Anniversary Saturn Awards in 2022.

== Winners and nominees ==
The winners are listed in bold.

(NOTE: Year refers to year of eligibility, the actual ceremonies are held the following year)

=== 2010s ===
Year	TV Series	Network
2014 **(41st)**	**The Flash**	**The CW**
2014 **(41st)**	Agent Carter	ABC
2014 **(41st)**	Agents of S.H.I.E.L.D.	ABC
2014 **(41st)**	Arrow	The CW
2014 **(41st)**	Constantine	NBC
2014 **(41st)**	Gotham	Fox
2015 **(42nd)**	**The Flash**	**The CW**
2015 **(42nd)**	Agent Carter	ABC
2015 **(42nd)**	Agents of S.H.I.E.L.D.	ABC
2015 **(42nd)**	Arrow	The CW
2015 **(42nd)**	Gotham	Fox
2015 **(42nd)**	Legends of Tomorrow	The CW
2015 **(42nd)**	Supergirl	CBS
2016 **(43rd)**	**Supergirl**	**The CW**
2016 **(43rd)**	Agents of S.H.I.E.L.D.	ABC
2016 **(43rd)**	Arrow	The CW
2016 **(43rd)**	The Flash	The CW
2016 **(43rd)**	Gotham	Fox
2016 **(43rd)**	Legion	FX
2017 **(44th)**	**The Flash**	**The CW**
2017 **(44th)**	Agents of S.H.I.E.L.D.	ABC
2017 **(44th)**	Arrow	The CW
2017 **(44th)**	Black Lightning	The CW
2017 **(44th)**	Gotham	Fox
2017 **(44th)**	Legends of Tomorrow	The CW
2017 **(44th)**	Supergirl	The CW
2018/2019 **(45th)**	**Supergirl**	**The CW**
2018/2019 **(45th)**	Arrow	The CW
2018/2019 **(45th)**	Black Lightning	The CW
2018/2019 **(45th)**	Cloak & Dagger	Freeform
2018/2019 **(45th)**	The Flash	The CW
2018/2019 **(45th)**	Gotham	Fox
2018/2019 **(45th)**	Legends of Tomorrow	The CW
2019/2020 **(46th)**	**The Boys**	**Amazon Prime Video**
2019/2020 **(46th)**	Batwoman	The CW
2019/2020 **(46th)**	The Flash	The CW
2019/2020 **(46th)**	Stargirl	The CW
2019/2020 **(46th)**	Supergirl	The CW
2019/2020 **(46th)**	The Umbrella Academy	Netflix
2019/2020 **(46th)**	Watchmen	HBO

=== 2020s ===
Year	TV Series	Network
2022/2023 **(51st)**	**Superman & Lois**	**The CW**
2022/2023 **(51st)**	Doom Patrol	HBO / Max
2022/2023 **(51st)**	The Flash	The CW
2022/2023 **(51st)**	The Sandman	Netflix
2022/2023 **(51st)**	Secret Invasion	Disney+
2022/2023 **(51st)**	She-Hulk: Attorney at Law	Disney+
2022/2023 **(51st)**	Stargirl	The CW
2023/2024 **(52nd)**	**Agatha All Along**	**Disney+**
2023/2024 **(52nd)**	The Boys	Amazon Prime Video
2023/2024 **(52nd)**	Loki	Disney+
2023/2024 **(52nd)**	The Penguin	Max
2023/2024 **(52nd)**	Superman & Lois	The CW
2023/2024 **(52nd)**	The Umbrella Academy	Netflix
2024/2025 **(53rd)**	**Peacemaker**	**HBO Max**
2024/2025 **(53rd)**	Daredevil: Born Again	Disney+
2024/2025 **(53rd)**	Gen V	Amazon Prime Video
2024/2025 **(53rd)**	Invincible	Amazon Prime Video
2024/2025 **(53rd)**	Ironheart	Disney+
2024/2025 **(53rd)**	The Sandman	Netflix

== Most nominations ==
- 7 nominations – The Flash
- 5 nominations – Arrow, Gotham, Supergirl
- 4 nominations – Agents of S.H.I.E.L.D.
- 3 nominations – Legends of Tomorrow
- 2 nominations – Agent Carter, Black Lightning, The Boys, Stargirl, The Umbrella Academy

== Most wins ==
- 3 wins – The Flash
- 2 wins – Supergirl

== See also ==
- Saturn Award for Best Network Television Series
- Saturn Award for Best Streaming Superhero Series
