= Special Recognition Award =

US media award

The Special Recognition Award is presented by the Academy of Science Fiction, Fantasy and Horror Films, in conjunction with their annual Saturn Award ceremony.

== Recipients ==
Below is a list of recipients and the year the award was presented:

- Marc Cushman – These Are the Voyages... (2014)
- Don Mancini - Child's Play/Chucky (2018)
