= Saturn Award for Best Streaming Science Fiction, Action & Fantasy Series =

Former annual US media award

- Awarded for: Best streaming series of the year in the science fiction, action and fantasy genres
- Country: United States
- Presented by: Academy of Science Fiction, Fantasy and Horror Films
- First award: 2019
- Currently held by: Star Trek: Discovery
- Website: www.saturnawards.org

The Saturn Award for Best Streaming Science Fiction, Action & Fantasy Series was presented once at the 45th Saturn Awards, honoring the best streaming series in the genres of science fiction, action and fantasy.

At the 47th Saturn Awards in 2022, the category was revived and split into three categories: Best Streaming Science Fiction Television Series, Best Streaming Action Adventure Television Series and Best Streaming Fantasy Television Series.

(NOTE: Year refers to year of eligibility, the actual ceremonies are held the following year)

== Winners and Nominees ==
Year	TV Series	Streaming Service
2018/2019 (45th)	Star Trek: Discovery	CBS All Access
2018/2019 (45th)	Black Mirror	Netflix
2018/2019 (45th)	The Expanse	Amazon Prime Video
2018/2019 (45th)	Good Omens	Amazon Prime Video
2018/2019 (45th)	Jack Ryan	Amazon Prime Video
2018/2019 (45th)	Lost in Space	Netflix
2018/2019 (45th)	Russian Doll	Netflix

== See also ==
- Saturn Award for Best Science Fiction Television Series
- Saturn Award for Best Action-Thriller Television Series
- Saturn Award for Best Fantasy Television Series
- Saturn Award for Best New Media Television Series
