= 46th Saturn Awards =

2021 science fiction awards ceremony

- Date: October 26, 2021

Highlights
- Most awards: Film: Star Wars: The Rise of Skywalker (5); Television: Star Trek: Discovery (2)
- Most nominations: Film: Star Wars: The Rise of Skywalker (12); Television: Better Call Saul; Outlander; The Walking Dead (5)

The 46th Saturn Awards, presented by the Academy of Science Fiction, Fantasy and Horror Films, and honoring the best in science fiction, fantasy, horror, and other genres belonging to genre fiction in film, television, home media releases, and live stage productions, were held October 26, 2021, at the L.A. Marriott Burbank Hotel. Nominations were announced on March 4, 2021. Bruce Campbell hosted the event.

Star Wars: The Rise of Skywalker scored the most film nominations overall with twelve, including Best Science Fiction Film Release. It is one of several films from the previous year's film awards season that was eligible after the group extended its eligibility period to run July 15, 2019 – November 15, 2020, and allowed streaming and VOD titles to qualify for the film categories. The Star Wars franchise ended up winning seven awards thanks to Star Wars: The Rise of Skywalker, the animated series Star Wars: The Clone Wars and the live-action series The Mandalorian. The Star Trek franchise earned the most awards in the television categories, thanks to the three awards won by Star Trek: Discovery and Star Trek: Picard.

== Winners and nominees ==
=== Film ===
Best Comic to Motion Picture Release	Best Science Fiction Film Release
Joker; Birds of Prey; Bloodshot; The New Mutants; The Old Guard	Star Wars: The Rise of Skywalker; Ad Astra; Gemini Man; Lucy in the Sky; Tenet; Terminator: Dark Fate
Best Fantasy Film Release	Best Horror Film Release
Once Upon a Time in Hollywood; Bill & Ted Face the Music; Jumanji: The Next Level; The Lion King; Maleficent: Mistress of Evil; Sonic the Hedgehog; The Witches	The Invisible Man; Doctor Sleep; Freaky; It Chapter Two; Midsommar; Ready or Not; Scary Stories to Tell in the Dark
Best Action / Adventure Film Release	Best Thriller Film Release
Mulan; 1917; Bad Boys for Life; El Camino: A Breaking Bad Movie; The Gentlemen; Hobbs & Shaw	Knives Out; Da 5 Bloods; The Good Liar; The Irishman; Mank; Uncut Gems
Best Animated Film Release	Best International Film Release
Onward; Abominable; The Addams Family; Frozen II; Spies in Disguise; Trolls World Tour	Parasite; Jojo Rabbit; The Nightingale; Official Secrets; Sputnik; The Whistlers
Best Film Director	Best Film Writing
J. J. Abrams – Star Wars: The Rise of Skywalker; Niki Caro – Mulan; Mike Flanagan – Doctor Sleep; Christopher Nolan – Tenet; Gina Prince-Bythewood – The Old Guard; Quentin Tarantino – Once Upon a Time in Hollywood; Leigh Whannell – The Invisible Man	Quentin Tarantino – Once Upon a Time in Hollywood; J. J. Abrams and Chris Terrio – Star Wars: The Rise of Skywalker; Mike Flanagan – Doctor Sleep; Lauren Hynek, Rick Jaffa, Amanda Silver and Elizabeth Martin – Mulan; Bong Joon-ho and Han Jin-won – Parasite; Christopher Nolan – Tenet; Todd Phillips and Scott Silver – Joker
Best Actor in a Film	Best Actress in a Film
John David Washington – Tenet as Protagonist; Daniel Craig – Knives Out as Benoit Blanc; Delroy Lindo – Da 5 Bloods as Paul; Ewan McGregor – Doctor Sleep as Dan Torrance; Gary Oldman – Mank as Herman J. Mankiewicz; Aaron Paul – El Camino: A Breaking Bad Movie as Jesse Pinkman; Joaquin Phoenix – Joker as Arthur Fleck / Joker	Elisabeth Moss – The Invisible Man as Cecilia "Cee" Kass; Rebecca Ferguson – Doctor Sleep as Rose the Hat; Natalie Portman – Lucy in the Sky as Lucy Cola; Daisy Ridley – Star Wars: The Rise of Skywalker as Rey; Margot Robbie – Birds of Prey as Harley Quinn; Charlize Theron – The Old Guard as Andy; Liu Yifei – Mulan as Mulan
Best Supporting Actor in a Film	Best Supporting Actress in a Film
Bill Hader – It Chapter Two as Richard "Richie" Tozier; Adam Driver – Star Wars: The Rise of Skywalker as Kylo Ren; Chris Evans – Knives Out as Hugh Ransom Drysdale; Ian McDiarmid – Star Wars: The Rise of Skywalker as Emperor Palpatine; Robert Pattinson – Tenet as Neil; Donnie Yen – Mulan as Commander Tung	Ana de Armas – Knives Out as Marta Cabrera; Zazie Beetz – Joker as Sophie Dumond; Ellen Burstyn – Lucy in the Sky as Nana Holbrook; Jamie Lee Curtis – Knives Out as Linda Drysdale; Linda Hamilton – Terminator: Dark Fate as Sarah Connor; Amanda Seyfried – Mank as Marion Davies; Jurnee Smollett – Birds of Prey as Dinah Lance / Black Canary
Best Performance by a Younger Actor in a Film	Best Film Editing
Kyliegh Curran – Doctor Sleep as Abra Stone; Ella Jay Basco – Birds of Prey as Cassandra Cain; Julia Butters – Once Upon a Time in Hollywood as Trudi Frazer; Roman Griffin Davis – Jojo Rabbit as Johannes "Jojo" Betzler; Lexy Kolker – Freaks as Chloe Lewis; JD McCrary – The Lion King as Simba	Bob Ducsay – Knives Out; Maryann Brandon and Stefan Grube – Star Wars: The Rise of Skywalker; Mike Flanagan – Doctor Sleep; Jennifer Lame – Tenet; Fred Raskin – Once Upon a Time in Hollywood; Jinmo Yang – Parasite
Best Film Music	Best Film Production Design
John Williams – Star Wars: The Rise of Skywalker; Ludwig Göransson – Tenet; Nathan Johnson – Knives Out; Jaeil Jung – Parasite; Thomas Newman – 1917; Trent Reznor and Atticus Ross – Mank	Barbara Ling – Once Upon a Time in Hollywood; Rick Carter and Kevin Jenkins – Star Wars: The Rise of Skywalker; Nathan Crowley – Tenet; Mark Friedberg – Joker; Patrick Tatopoulos – Maleficent: Mistress of Evil; Ra Vincent – Jojo Rabbit
Best Film Costume Design	Best Film Make Up
Bina Daigeler – Mulan; Erin Benach – Birds of Prey; Michael Kaplan – Star Wars: The Rise of Skywalker; Arianne Phillips – Once Upon a Time in Hollywood; Mayes C. Rubeo – Jojo Rabbit; Albert Wolsky – Ad Astra	Amanda Knight and Neal Scanlan – Star Wars: The Rise of Skywalker; Bianca Appice, Bill Corso, Stephen Kelly, Dennis Liddiard, and Kevin Yagher – Bill & Ted Face the Music; Norman Cabrera, Mike Elizalde, and Mike Hill – Scary Stories to Tell in the Dark; Iantha Goldberg, Sean Sansom, and Shane Zander – It Chapter Two; Robert Kurtzman and Bernadette Mazur – Doctor Sleep; Arjen Tuiten and David White – Maleficent: Mistress of Evil
Best Film Special / Visual Effects	Best Independent Film Release
Roger Guyett, Neal Scanlan, Patrick Tubach and Dominic Tuohy – Star Wars: The Rise of Skywalker; Eric Barba, Neil Corbould, Vinod Gundre and Sheldon Stopsack – Terminator: Dark Fate; Nicholas Brooks and Kristy Hollidge – It Chapter Two; Mike Chambers, Scott R. Fisher, Andrew Jackson and Andrew Lockley – Tenet; Ken Egly and Robert Legato – The Lion King; Scott R. Fisher and Allen Maris – Ad Astra; Mark Hawker, Yael Majors and Greg Steele – Birds of Prey	Encounter; The Aeronauts; Angel of Mine; Color Out of Space; Freaks; Palm Springs; Possessor

=== Television ===
Best Superhero Adaptation Television Series	Best Science Fiction Television Series
The Boys (Amazon Prime Video); Batwoman (The CW); The Flash (The CW); Stargirl (DC Universe); Supergirl (The CW); The Umbrella Academy (Netflix); Watchmen (HBO)	Star Trek: Discovery (CBS All Access); Doctor Who (BBC America); Lost in Space (Netflix); Pandora (The CW); Raised by Wolves (HBO Max); Star Trek: Picard (CBS All Access); Westworld (HBO)
Best Fantasy Television Series	Best Horror Television Series
For All Mankind (Apple TV+); The Dark Crystal: Age of Resistance (Netflix); Locke & Key (Netflix); The Magicians (Syfy); Outlander (Starz); The Twilight Zone (CBS All Access); The Witcher (Netflix)	The Walking Dead (AMC); Creepshow (Shudder); Evil (CBS); Fear the Walking Dead (AMC); Lovecraft Country (HBO); Servant (Apple TV+); What We Do in the Shadows (FX)
Best Action / Thriller Television Series	Best Animated Series on Television
Better Call Saul (AMC); Castle Rock (Hulu); Jack Ryan (Amazon Prime Video); The Outpost (The CW); Pennyworth (Epix); Riverdale (The CW); Snowpiercer (TNT)	Star Wars: The Clone Wars (Disney+); BoJack Horseman (Netflix); Family Guy (Fox); Primal (Adult Swim); Rick and Morty (Adult Swim); The Simpsons (Fox)
Best Television Presentation (under 10 Episodes)	Best Film Presentation in Streaming Media
The Mandalorian (Disney+); Amazing Stories (Apple TV+); Dracula (Netflix); The Haunting of Bly Manor (Netflix); His Dark Materials (HBO); Perry Mason (HBO)	Enola Holmes (Netflix); Extraction (Netflix); Shirley (Hulu); The Vast of Night (Amazon Prime Video)
Best Actor on Television	Best Actress on Television
Patrick Stewart as Jean-Luc Picard on Star Trek: Picard (CBS All Access); Henry Cavill as Geralt of Rivia on The Witcher (Netflix); Mike Colter as David Acosta on Evil (CBS); Grant Gustin as Barry Allen / The Flash on The Flash (The CW); Sam Heughan as Jamie Fraser on Outlander (Starz); Jonathan Majors as Atticus "Tic" Freeman on Lovecraft Country (HBO); Bob Odenkirk as Jimmy McGill / Saul Goodman on Better Call Saul (AMC)	Caitríona Balfe as Claire Fraser on Outlander (Starz); Melissa Benoist as Kara Danvers / Supergirl on Supergirl (The CW); Regina King as Angela Abar / Sister Night on Watchmen (HBO); Sonequa Martin-Green as Michael Burnham on Star Trek: Discovery (CBS All Access); Thandiwe Newton as Maeve Millay on Westworld (HBO); Candice Patton as Iris West on The Flash (The CW); Rhea Seehorn as Kim Wexler on Better Call Saul (AMC)
Best Supporting Actor on Television	Best Supporting Actress on Television
Doug Jones as Saru on Star Trek: Discovery (CBS All Access); Jonathan Banks as Mike Ehrmantraut on Better Call Saul (AMC); Tony Dalton as Lalo Salamanca on Better Call Saul (AMC); Michael Emerson as Dr. Leland Townsend on Evil (CBS); Richard Rankin as Roger Wakefield on Outlander (Starz); Norman Reedus as Daryl Dixon on The Walking Dead (AMC); Luke Wilson as Pat Dugan / S.T.R.I.P.E. on Stargirl (DC Universe)	Danielle Panabaker as Caitlin Snow / Frost on The Flash (The CW); Natasia Demetriou as Nadja on What We Do in the Shadows (FX); Cynthia Erivo as Holly Gibney on The Outsider (HBO); Melissa McBride as Carol Peletier on The Walking Dead (AMC); Colby Minifie as Virginia on Fear the Walking Dead (AMC); Sophie Skelton as Brianna "Bree" Randall on Outlander (Starz); Tessa Thompson as Charlotte Hale on Westworld (HBO)
Best Performance by a Younger Actor on a Television Series	Best Guest Performance on a Television Series
Brec Bassinger as Courtney Whitmore / Stargirl on Stargirl (DC Universe); Freya Allan as Ciri on The Witcher (Netflix); Isa Briones as Dahj / Soji / Sutra on Star Trek: Picard (CBS All Access); Maxwell Jenkins as Will Robinson on Lost in Space (Netflix); Madison Lintz as Madeline "Maddie" Bosch on Bosch (Amazon Prime Video); Cassady McClincy as Lydia on The Walking Dead (AMC); Erin Moriarty as Starlight / Annie January on The Boys (Amazon Prime Video)	Jon Cryer as Lex Luthor on Supergirl (The CW); Giancarlo Esposito as Moff Gideon on The Mandalorian (Disney+); Mark Hamill as Jim the Vampire on What We Do in the Shadows (FX); Jeffrey Dean Morgan as Negan on The Walking Dead (AMC); Kate Mulgrew as Alma Lane on Mr. Mercedes (Audience); Billy Porter as Keith on The Twilight Zone (CBS All Access); Jeri Ryan as Seven of Nine on Star Trek: Picard (CBS All Access)

=== Home Entertainment ===
Best 4K Film Release	Best DVD / BD Classic Film Release
Knives Out; The Alfred Hitchcock Classics Collection; Apocalypse Now: Final Cut (40th Anniversary Edition); Flash Gordon (Limited Edition); Jaws (45th Anniversary); Mad Max; The Shining; War of the Worlds	Dr. Cyclops (Special Edition); 4D Man (Special Edition); The Day the Earth Caught Fire (Special Edition); Hercules in the Haunted World (Special Edition); The Magic Sword (Special Edition); RoboCop (Director's Cut); The War of the Worlds (The Criterion Collection)
Best DVD / BD Collection	Best DVD / BD Television Movie or Series Release
Godzilla: The Showa-Era Films, 1954–1975 (The Criterion Collection); Abbott & Costello: The Complete Universal Pictures Collection (80th Anniversary Blu-ray Edition); The Fly Collection (The Fly (1958), Return of the Fly, Curse of the Fly, The Fly (1986), and The Fly II); Gamera: The Complete Collection; Hitchcock: British International Pictures Collection; Laurel & Hardy: The Definitive Restorations; Three Fantastic Journeys by Karel Zeman (The Criterion Collection) (Journey to the Beginning of Time, Invention for Destruction, and The Fabulous Baron Munchausen)	Creepshow (Season One); Buck Rogers in the 25th Century (The Complete Collection); The Librarians (The Complete Series); Mission: Impossible (The Original TV Series); The Outsider (The First Season); Shazam! (The Complete Live Action Series); The Simpsons (The Nineteenth Season)

=== Live Stage Production ===
Best Live Stage Production
- Witch (Geffen Playhouse)
  - Anastasia (Segerstrom Center for the Arts)
  - Frankenstein (A Noise Within Theatre)
  - Good Boys (Pasadena Playhouse)
  - Once (3-D Theatricals / Cerritos Center)
  - Shrek The Musical (3-D Theatricals / Cerritos Center)

=== Special awards ===
- Visionary Award – Mike Flanagan
- Life Career Award – Michael Gruskoff
- Dan Curtis Legacy Award – Eric Wallace
- Producers Showcase Award – Victoria Alonso
- Special Achievement Award – David Kirschner
- Television Spotlight Award – The Expanse
- Robert Forster Artist's Award – Christopher Lloyd

== Multiple nominations ==
Films with multiple nominations
Nominations	Film
12	Star Wars: The Rise of Skywalker
9	Tenet
8	Doctor Sleep
7	Knives Out
7	Once Upon a Time in Hollywood
6	Birds of Prey
6	Mulan
5	Joker
4	It Chapter Two
4	Jojo Rabbit
4	Mank
4	Parasite
3	Ad Astra
3	The Invisible Man
3	The Lion King
3	Lucy in the Sky
3	Maleficent: Mistress of Evil
3	The Old Guard
3	Terminator: Dark Fate
2	1917
2	Bill & Ted Face the Music
2	Da 5 Bloods
2	El Camino: A Breaking Bad Movie
2	Freaks
2	Scary Stories to Tell in the Dark

TV series with multiple nominations
Nominations	TV series
5	Better Call Saul
5	Outlander
5	The Walking Dead
4	The Flash
4	Star Trek: Picard
3	Evil
3	Stargirl
3	Star Trek: Discovery
3	Supergirl
3	Westworld
3	What We Do in the Shadows
3	The Witcher
2	The Boys
2	Fear the Walking Dead
2	Lost in Space
2	Lovecraft Country
2	The Mandalorian
2	The Twilight Zone
2	Watchmen

== Multiple wins ==
Films with multiple wins
Wins	Film
5	Star Wars: The Rise of Skywalker
4	Knives Out
3	Once Upon a Time in Hollywood
2	The Invisible Man
2	Mulan

TV series with multiple wins
Wins	TV series
2	Star Trek: Discovery
