= The George Pal Memorial Award =

US media award

George Pal Memorial Award
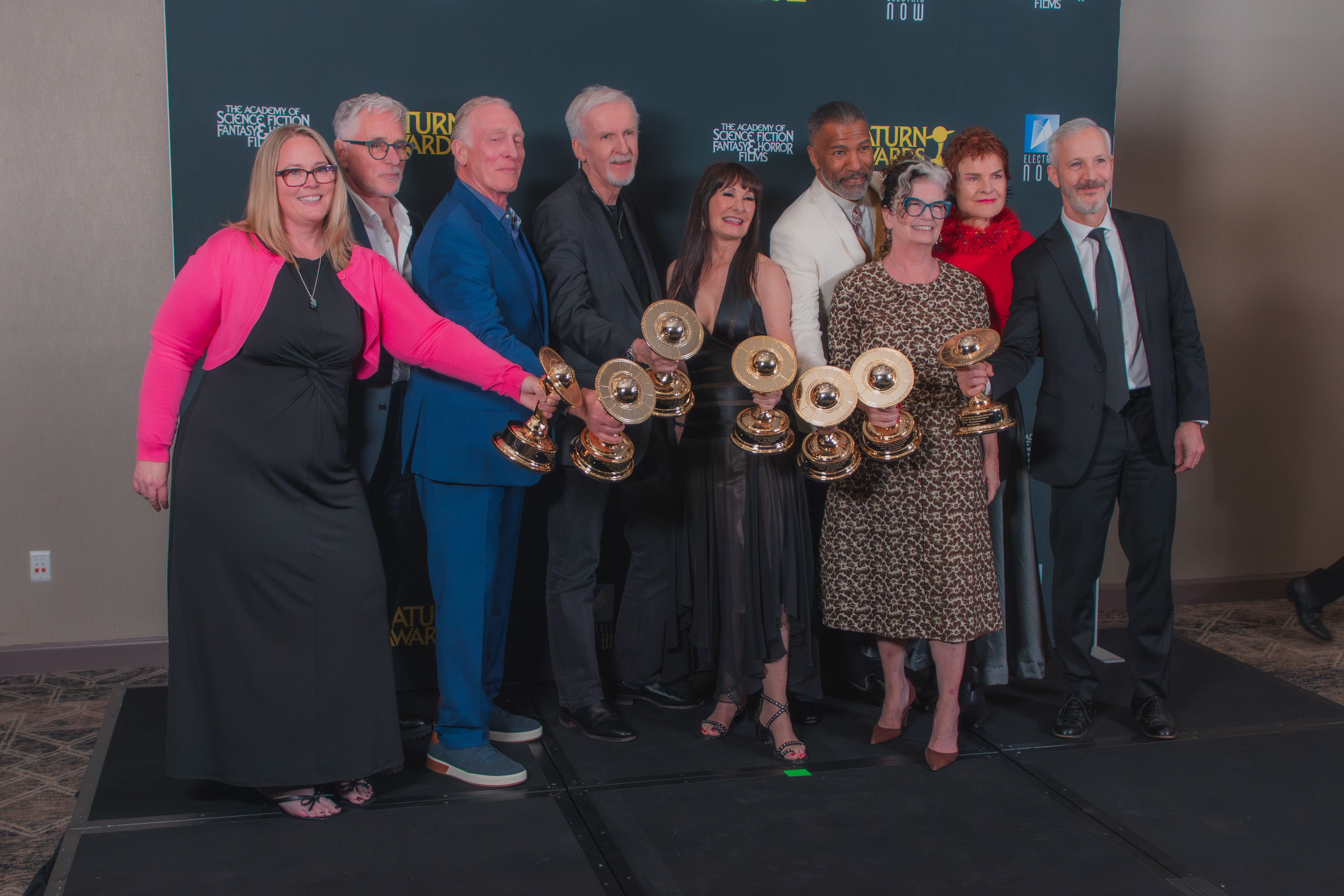
- The 2024/2025 recipients for Aliens
- Awarded for: Exemplary work in science fiction, fantasy and horror films and television
- Country: United States
- Presented by: Academy of Science Fiction, Fantasy and Horror Films
- First award: 1975
- Website: saturnawards.org

The George Pal Memorial Award is presented each year, by the Academy of Science Fiction, Fantasy and Horror Films, in conjunction with their annual Saturn Award ceremony. The award is given to those who have shown exemplary work in the respective film genres. It is named in honor of George Pal, a Hungarian-born American animator and film producer, principally associated with the science fiction genre.

The latest honoree is the 1986 film Aliens as of March 2026.

== Recipients ==
Below is a list of recipients and the year the award was presented:

=== 1970s ===
- C. Dean Anderson (1975)
- Don Fanzo (1975)
- Gloria Swanson (1975)
- Fay Wray (1975)

=== 1980s ===
- John Badham (1980)
- Nicholas Meyer (1984)
- Douglas Trumbull (1985)
- Charles Band (1986)
- Arnold Leibovit (1987)
- Larry Cohen (1988)
- David Cronenberg (1989)

=== 1990s ===
- William Friedkin (1991)
- Gene Roddenberry (1992)
- Frank Marshall (1993)
- Wah Chang (1994)
- Gene Warren (1994)
- Stan Winston (1994)
- Robert Zemeckis (1995)
- John Carpenter (1996)
- Kathleen Kennedy (1997)
- Dean Devlin (1998)
- Ray Bradbury (1999)

=== 2000s ===
- Douglas Wick (2000)
- Sam Raimi (2001)
- Samuel Z. Arkoff (2002)
- Ridley Scott (2004)
- Ray Harryhausen (2006)
- Guillermo del Toro (2008)

=== 2010s ===
- Alex Kurtzman (2010)
- Roberto Orci (2010)
- Martin Scorsese (2012)
- Gregory Nicotero (2014)
- Simon Kinberg (2015)

=== 2020s ===
- Dave Filoni (2022/2023)
- Back to the Future (2023/2024)
- Aliens (2024/2025)
