= Academy of Science Fiction, Fantasy and Horror Films =

American non-profit film association

- Formation: 1972
- Founder: Donald A. Reed
- Type: Film
- Legal status: Active
- Headquarters: Los Angeles, California, United States
- Official language: English
- Website: saturnawards.org

The Academy of Science Fiction, Fantasy and Horror Films is an American nonprofit organization established in 1972 dedicated to the advancement of science fiction, fantasy and horror in film, television and home video. The Academy is headquartered in Los Angeles, California, and was founded by Dr. Donald A. Reed.

The Academy distributes its Saturn Awards annually to what it considers the best films of the genres. The award was initially and is still sometimes loosely referred to as a Golden Scroll. The Academy also publishes Saturn Rings, its official organ.

== See also ==
- Academy of Motion Picture Arts and Sciences
