= 53rd Saturn Awards =

2026 science fiction/fantasy/horror awards ceremony

- Date: March 8, 2026
- Site: Hilton Universal City, Los Angeles, California
- Hosted by: Joel McHale

Highlights
- Most awards: Film: Avatar: Fire and Ash (5); Television: Andor / Pluribus (3)
- Most nominations: Film: Avatar: Fire and Ash / The Fantastic Four: First Steps / Sinners (12); Television: Dexter: Resurrection (6)

Television coverage
- Network: saturnawards.tv

The 53rd Saturn Awards were presented by the Academy of Science Fiction, Fantasy and Horror Films, to honor the best in science fiction, fantasy, horror, and other genres belonging to genre fiction in film, television, and home entertainment.

The ceremony was held on March 8, 2026, at Hilton Universal City in Los Angeles, with Joel McHale as host for the fourth consecutive year, and streamed live for free on saturnawards.tv.

The nominations were announced on January 27, 2026. The genre-defying film Sinners, Marvel Cinematic Universe superhero film The Fantastic Four: First Steps, and science fiction epic Avatar: Fire and Ash led all film nominees, each receiving twelve nominations, followed by Guillermo del Toro's adaptation of Frankenstein with eleven. For the television categories, the Paramount+ crime drama mystery Dexter: Resurrection led the nominees with six, followed by Andor, It: Welcome to Derry, and Stranger Things with five each. Ultimately, Avatar: Fire and Ash won the most film awards with five, including Best Science Fiction Film and Best Film Direction (James Cameron), followed by Frankenstein with four. On the television side, Andor and Pluribus won the most awards with three each.

== Category changes ==
Introduced

- Best Cinematic Adaptation Film
- Best International Animated Film
- Best New Genre Television Series

Discontinued

- Best Genre Comedy Television Series

== Winners and nominees ==
=== Film ===
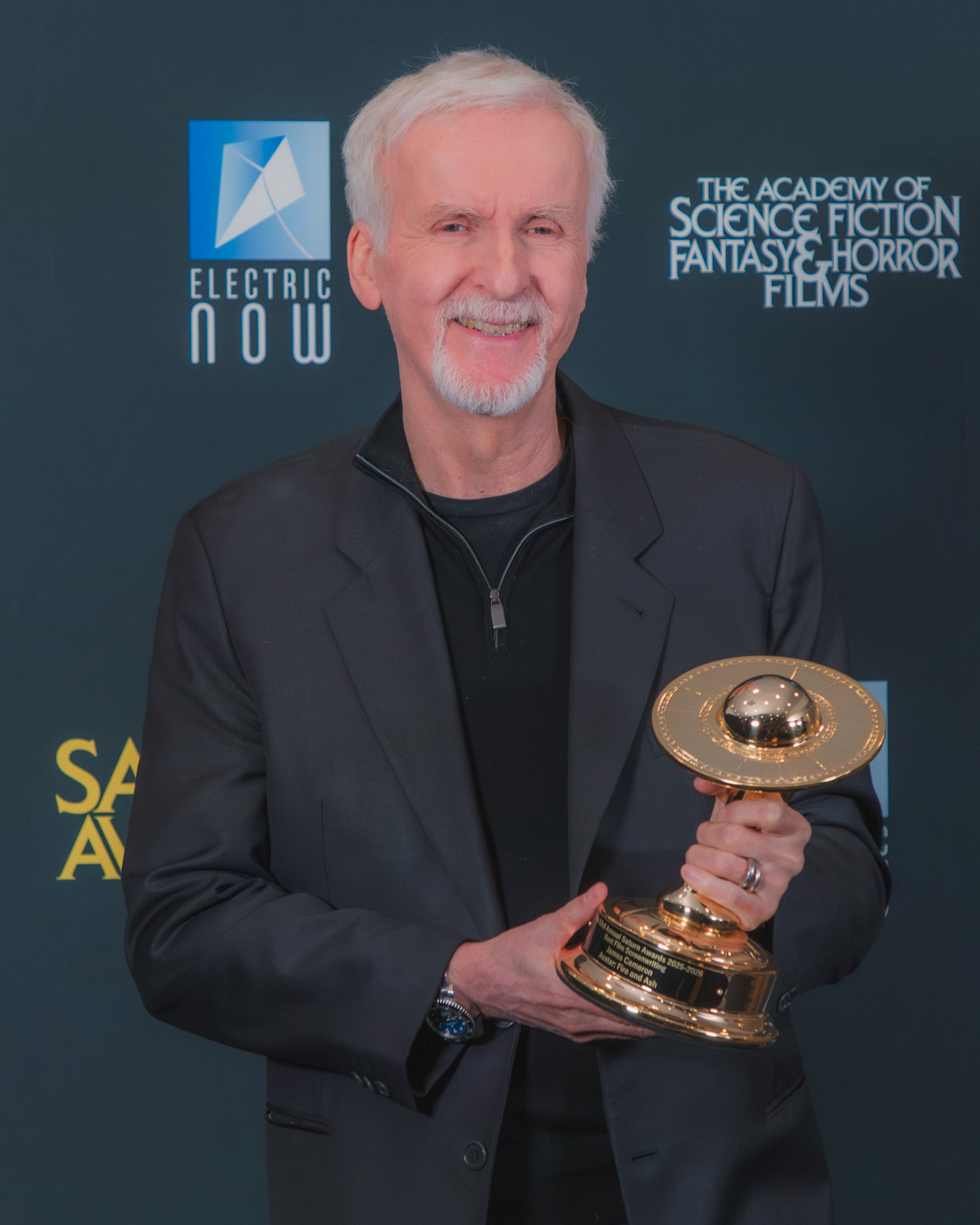
James Cameron, Best Film Direction winner and Best Film Screenwriting co-winner

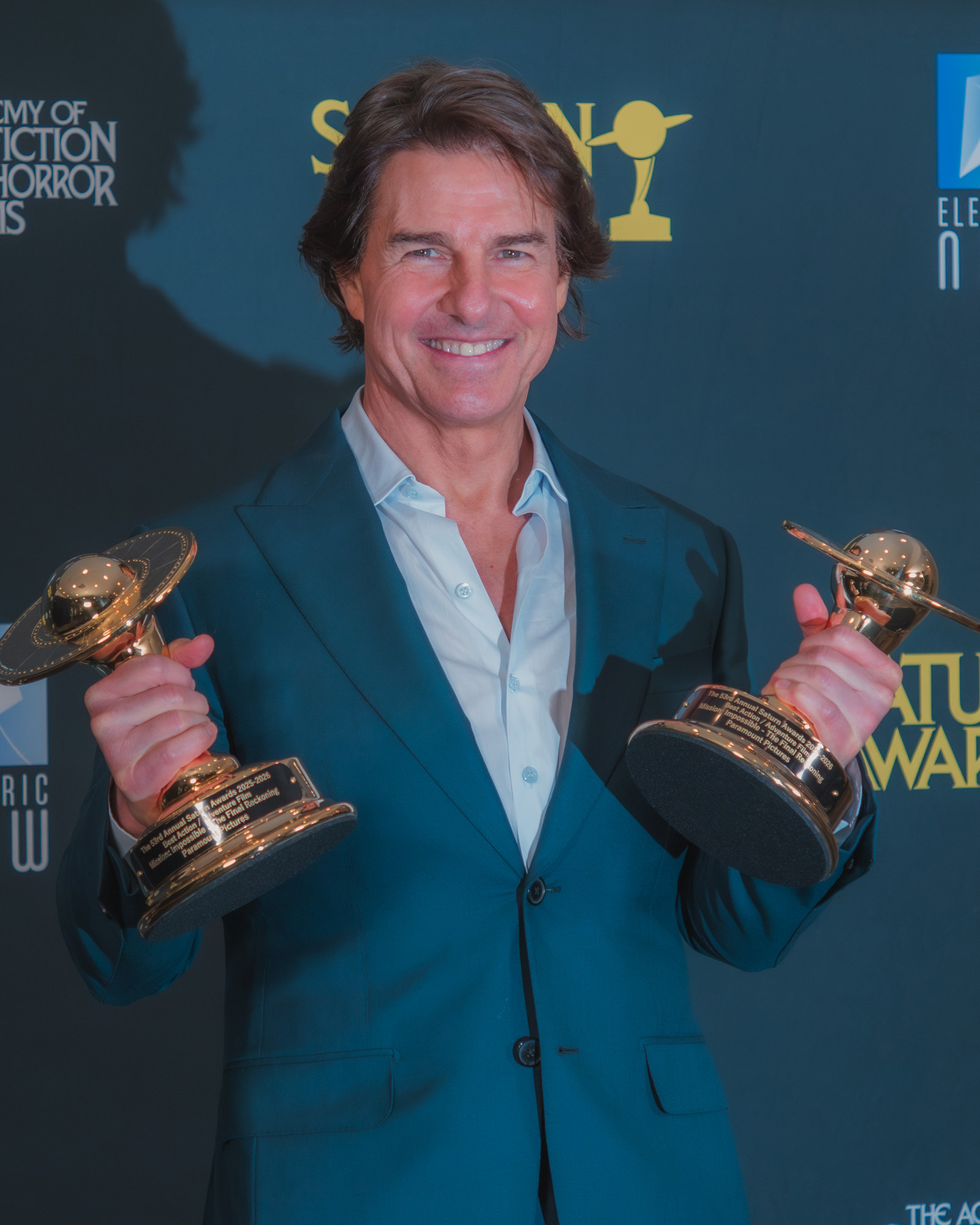
Tom Cruise, Best Actor in a Film winner

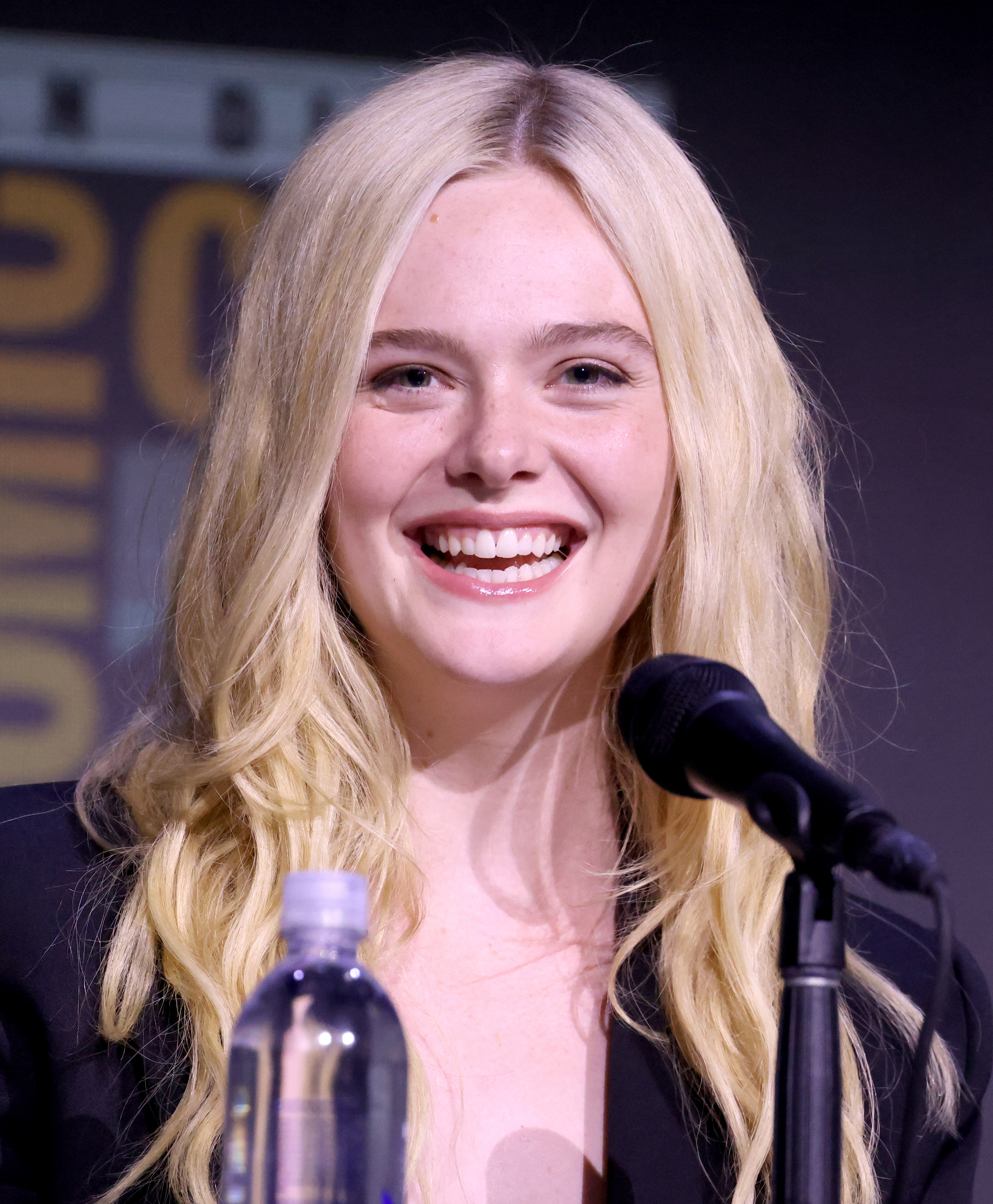
Elle Fanning, Best Actress in a Film winner

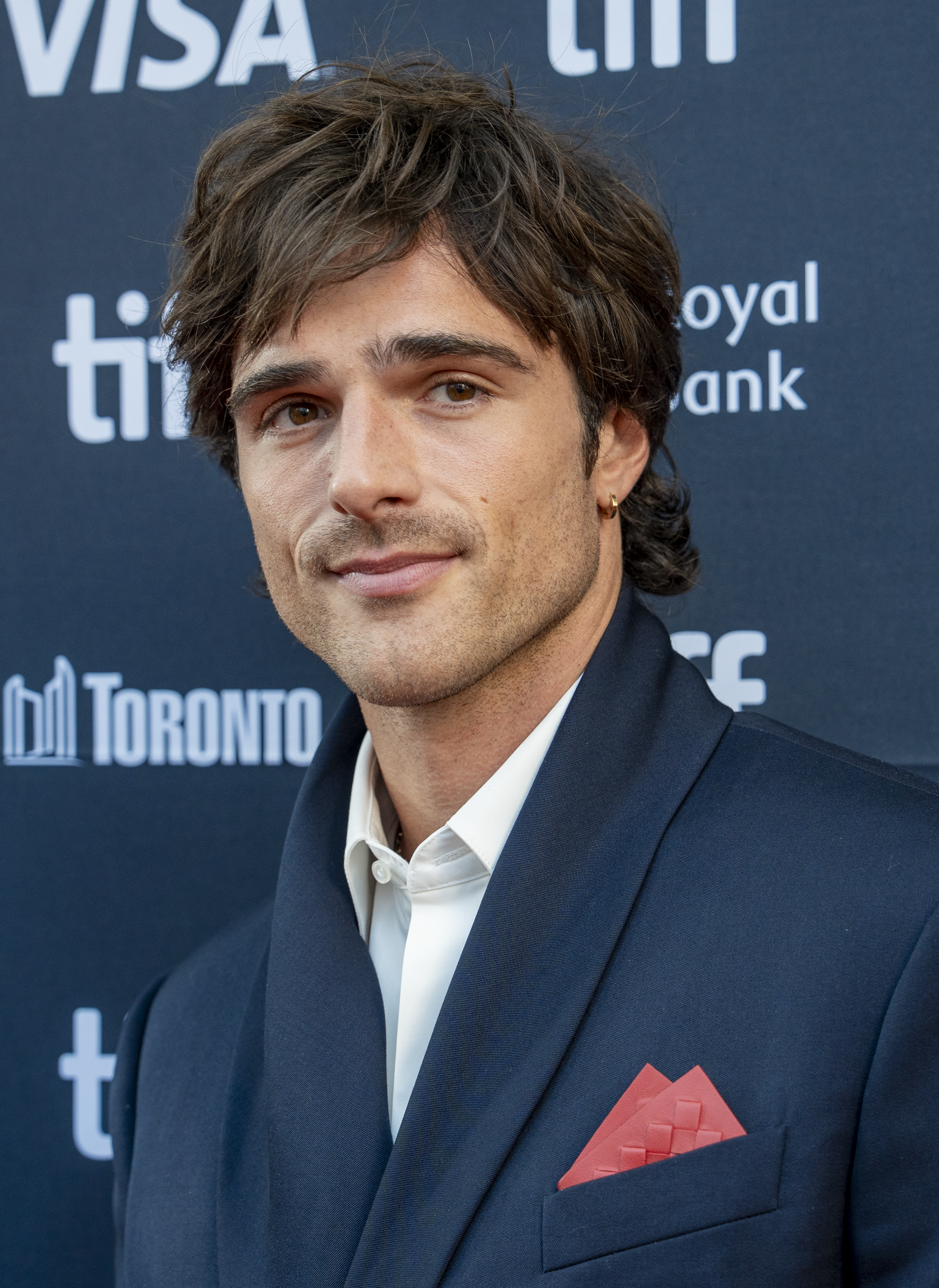
Jacob Elordi, Best Supporting Actor in a Film winner

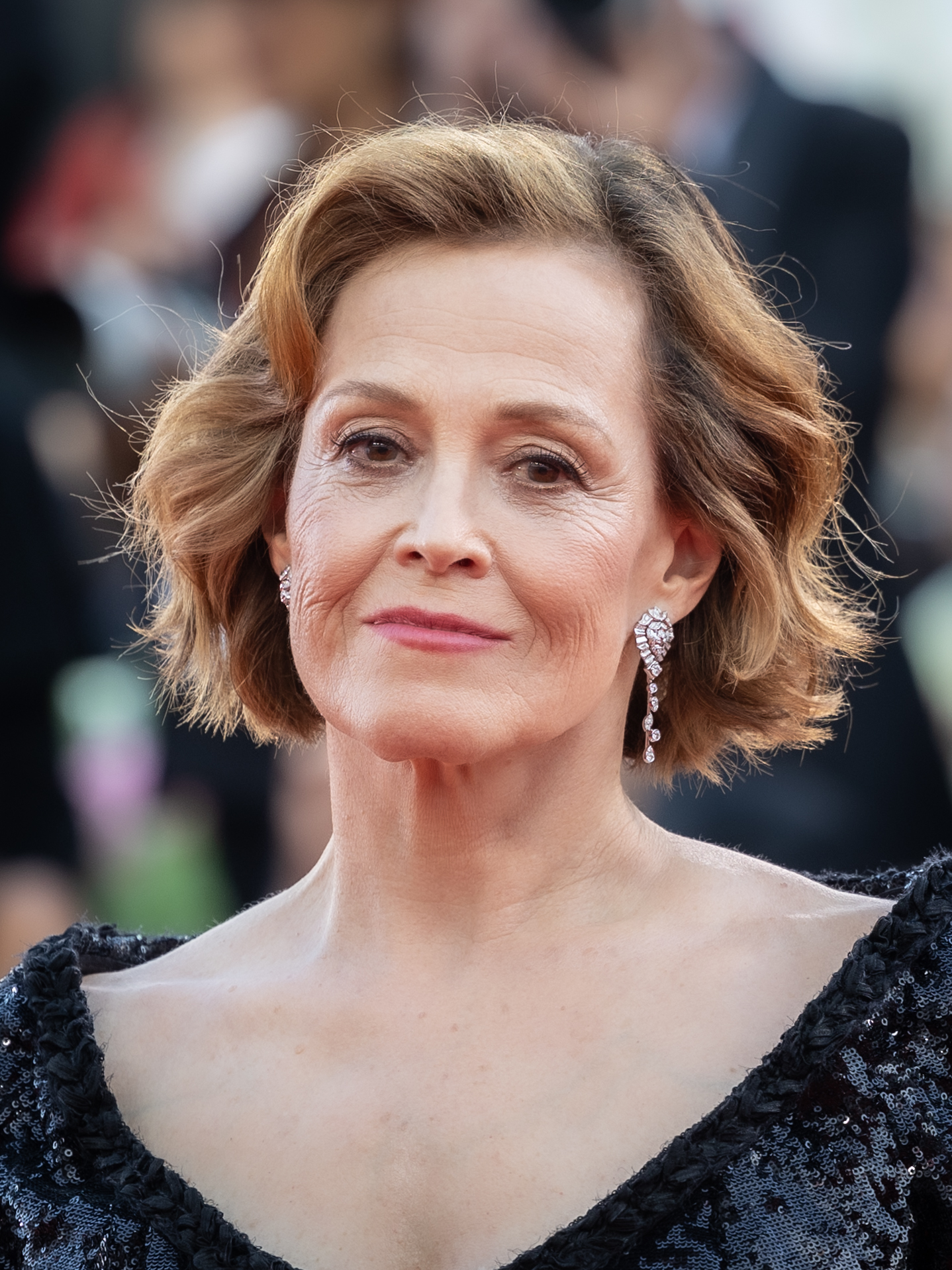
Sigourney Weaver, Best Supporting Actress in a Film winner

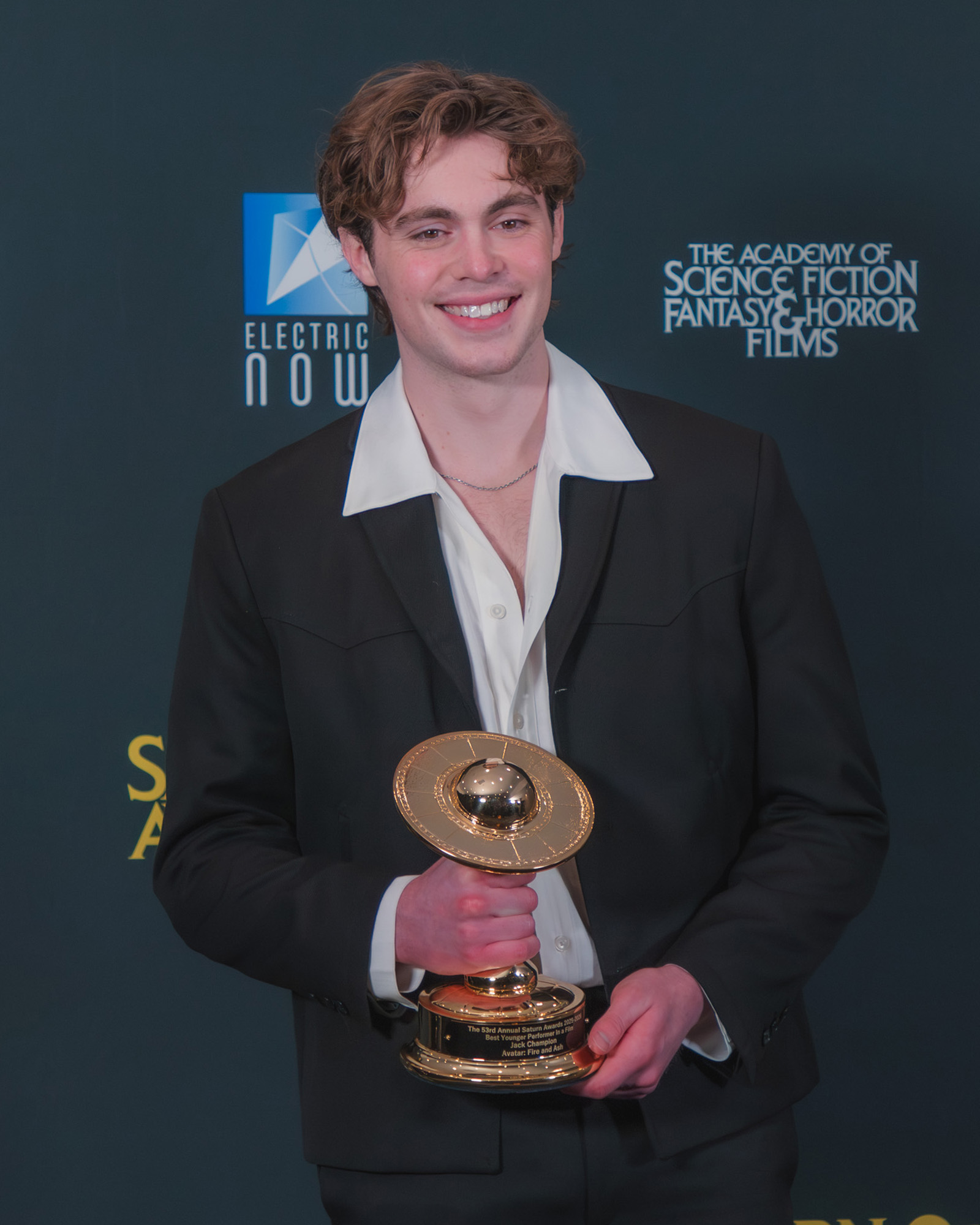
Jack Champion, Best Younger Performer in a Film winner

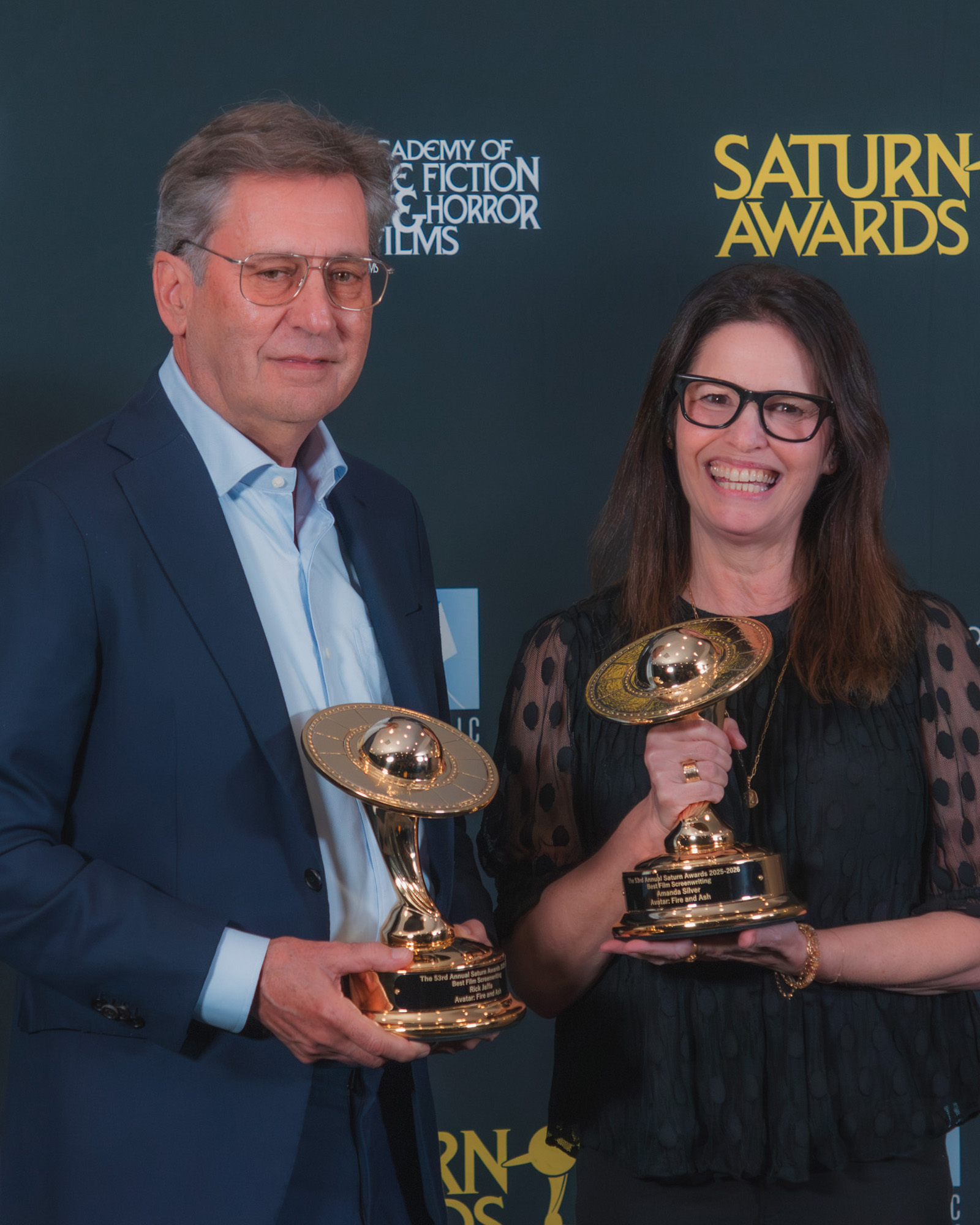
Rick Jaffa and Amanda Silver, Best Film Screenwriting co-winners

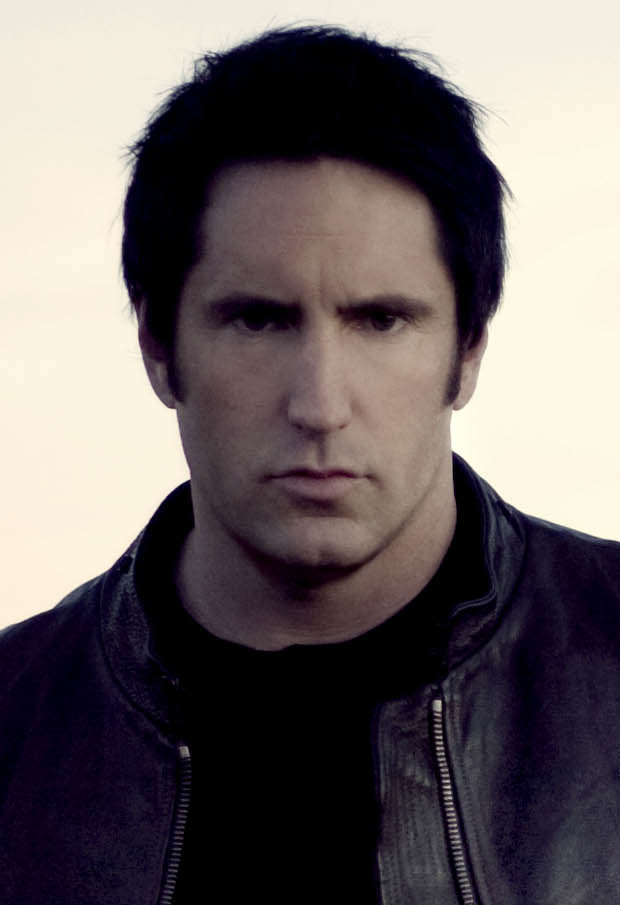
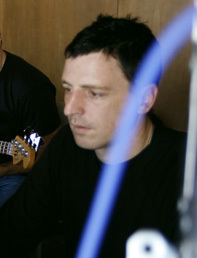
Trent Reznor and Atticus Ross, Best Film Music winners

| Best Science Fiction Film | Best Fantasy Film |
|---|---|
| Avatar: Fire and Ash; Bugonia; Jurassic World Rebirth; Predator: Badlands; The Running Man; Tron: Ares | Wicked: For Good; Freakier Friday; Hamnet; How to Train Your Dragon; The Life of Chuck; Lilo & Stitch |
| Best Horror Film | Best Action / Adventure Film |
| Frankenstein; 28 Years Later; The Conjuring: Last Rites; Final Destination Bloodlines; The Monkey; Weapons | Mission: Impossible – The Final Reckoning; Ballerina; F1; Novocaine; Now You See Me: Now You Don't; One Battle After Another |
| Best Thriller Film | Best Cinematic Adaptation Film |
| Sinners; Highest 2 Lowest; The Housemaid; The Long Walk; Marty Supreme; Wake Up Dead Man: A Knives Out Mystery | The Fantastic Four: First Steps; Black Phone 2; Captain America: Brave New World; A Minecraft Movie; Superman; Thunderbolts* |
| Best Animated Film | Best International Animated Film |
| Zootopia 2; The Bad Guys 2; The Day the Earth Blew Up: A Looney Tunes Movie; Elio; KPop Demon Hunters; The SpongeBob Movie: Search for SquarePants | Demon Slayer: Kimetsu no Yaiba – The Movie: Infinity Castle (Japan); Attack on Titan the Movie: The Last Attack (Japan); Chainsaw Man – The Movie: Reze Arc (Japan); The Colors Within (Japan); Ne Zha 2 (China); Stitch Head (Germany) |
| Best Independent Film | Best International Film |
| Dust Bunny; Adulthood; Eden; Good Boy; The Plague; The Rule of Jenny Pen; The Toxic Avenger | Sisu: Road to Revenge (Finland); 40 Acres (Canada); Bring Her Back (Australia); Dead of Winter (Germany); Night Call (France); The Ugly Stepsister (Norway) |
| Best Film Direction | Best Film Screenwriting |
| James Cameron – Avatar: Fire and Ash; Ryan Coogler – Sinners; Guillermo del Toro – Frankenstein; James Gunn – Superman; Christopher McQuarrie – Mission: Impossible – The Final Reckoning; Matt Shakman – The Fantastic Four: First Steps; Dan Trachtenberg – Predator: Badlands | James Cameron, Rick Jaffa, and Amanda Silver – Avatar: Fire and Ash; Ryan Coogler – Sinners; Zach Cregger – Weapons; Guillermo del Toro – Frankenstein; Josh Friedman, Eric Pearson, Jeff Kaplan, and Ian Springer – The Fantastic Four: First Steps; Bryan Fuller – Dust Bunny; Christopher McQuarrie and Erik Jendresen – Mission: Impossible – The Final Reckoning |
| Best Actor in a Film | Best Actress in a Film |
| Tom Cruise – Mission: Impossible – The Final Reckoning as Ethan Hunt; David Corenswet – Superman as Clark Kent / Superman; Tom Hiddleston – The Life of Chuck as Charles "Chuck" Kranz; Oscar Isaac – Frankenstein as Victor Frankenstein; Michael B. Jordan – Sinners as Elijah "Smoke" Moore / Elias "Stack" Moore; Pedro Pascal – The Fantastic Four: First Steps as Reed Richards / Mister Fantastic; Sam Worthington – Avatar: Fire and Ash as Jake Sully | Elle Fanning – Predator: Badlands as Thia / Tessa; Rachel Brosnahan – Superman as Lois Lane; Cynthia Erivo – Wicked: For Good as Elphaba; Julia Garner – Weapons as Justine Gandy; Vanessa Kirby – The Fantastic Four: First Steps as Sue Storm / Invisible Woman; Zoe Saldaña – Avatar: Fire and Ash as Neytiri; Emma Stone – Bugonia as Michelle Fuller |
| Best Supporting Actor in a Film | Best Supporting Actress in a Film |
| Jacob Elordi – Frankenstein as The Creature; Edi Gathegi – Superman as Michael Holt / Mister Terrific; Jeff Goldblum – Wicked: For Good as The Wonderful Wizard of Oz; Stephen Lang – Avatar: Fire and Ash as Colonel Miles Quaritch; Delroy Lindo – Sinners as Delta Slim; Mads Mikkelsen – Dust Bunny as Resident 5B; Ebon Moss-Bachrach – The Fantastic Four: First Steps as Ben Grimm / The Thing | Sigourney Weaver – Dust Bunny as Laverne; Oona Chaplin – Avatar: Fire and Ash as Varang; Mia Goth – Frankenstein as Elizabeth Harlander; Ariana Grande – Wicked: For Good as Glinda; Amy Madigan – Weapons as Gladys; Florence Pugh – Thunderbolts* as Yelena Belova; Hailee Steinfeld – Sinners as Mary |
| Best Younger Performer in a Film | Best Film Editing |
| Jack Champion – Avatar: Fire and Ash as Miles "Spider" Socorro; Miles Caton – Sinners as Samuel "Sammie" Moore; Maia Kealoha – Lilo & Stitch as Lilo Pelekai; Madeleine McGraw – Black Phone 2 as Gwen; Sophie Sloan – Dust Bunny as Aurora; Mason Thames – How to Train Your Dragon as Hiccup Horrendous Haddock III | Sinners – Michael P. Shawver; Avatar: Fire and Ash – James Cameron, John Refoua, Steve Rivkin, Nicolas de Toth, and Jason Gaudio; The Fantastic Four: First Steps – Nona Khodai and Tim Roche; Frankenstein – Evan Schiff; Mission: Impossible – The Final Reckoning – Eddie Hamilton; Predator: Badlands – Stefan Grube and Dave Trachtenberg |
| Best Film Music | Best Film Production Design |
| Tron: Ares – Nine Inch Nails (Trent Reznor and Atticus Ross); Avatar: Fire and Ash – Simon Franglen; The Fantastic Four: First Steps – Michael Giacchino; Frankenstein – Alexandre Desplat; Sinners – Ludwig Göransson; Wicked: For Good – John Powell and Stephen Schwartz | The Fantastic Four: First Steps – Jille Azis and Kasra Farahani; Avatar: Fire and Ash – Dylan Cole and Ben Procter; Frankenstein – Tamara Deverell and Shane Vieau; Sinners – Hannah Beachler and Monique Champagne; Superman – Beth Mickle; Wicked: For Good – Nathan Crowley and Lee Sandales |
| Best Film Costume Design | Best Film Make Up |
| Frankenstein – Kate Hawley; The Fantastic Four: First Steps – Alexandra Byrne; Predator: Badlands – Ngila Dickson; Sinners – Ruth E. Carter; Superman – Judianna Makovsky; Wicked: For Good – Paul Tazewell | Frankenstein – Mike Hill and Megan Many; 28 Years Later – Flora Moody and John Nolan; Sinners – Mike Fontaine and Siân Richards; Tron: Ares – Zabrina Matiru and Donald Mowat; Weapons – Jason Collins, Leo Satkovich, and Melizah Wheat; Wicked: For Good – Mark Coulier and Frances Hannon |
Best Film Visual / Special Effects
Avatar: Fire and Ash – Richard Baneham, Daniel Barrett, Joe Letteri, and Eric Saindon; The Fantastic Four: First Steps – Daniele Bigi, Lisa Marra, and Scott Stokdyk; How to Train Your Dragon – Andy Kind, François Lambert, Christian Manz, Glen McIntosh, and Glenn Melenhorst; Mission: Impossible – The Final Reckoning – Kristin Hall, Ian Lowe, Dave Newton, Jeff Sutherland, and Alex Wuttke; Superman – Stéphane Ceretti, Enrico Damm, Stephane Nazé, and Guy Williams; Wicked: For Good – Pablo Helman and Dale Newton

=== Television ===
==== Programs ====
| Best Science Fiction Television Series | Best Fantasy Television Series |
|---|---|
| Andor (Disney+); The Ark (Syfy); Foundation (Apple); Severance (Apple); Silo (Apple); Star Trek: Strange New Worlds (Paramount+) | Outlander (Starz); Anne Rice's Mayfair Witches (AMC); Ghosts (CBS); The Librarians: The Next Chapter (TNT); Stranger Things (Netflix); Wednesday (Netflix) |
| Best Horror Television Series | Best Action / Adventure Television Series |
| It: Welcome to Derry (HBO); Anne Rice's Talamasca: The Secret Order (AMC); The Institute (MGM+); The Last of Us (HBO); The Walking Dead: Dead City (AMC); Yellowjackets (Showtime) | Duster (HBO Max); Cobra Kai (Netflix); Paradise (Hulu); Reacher (Prime Video); Squid Game (Netflix); Twisted Metal (Peacock) |
| Best Thriller Television Series | Best Superhero Television Series |
| Dexter: Resurrection (Paramount+); Dark Winds (AMC); The Lowdown (FX); MobLand (Paramount+); The Rainmaker (USA Network); Your Friends & Neighbors (Apple) | Peacemaker (HBO Max); Daredevil: Born Again (Disney+); Gen V (Prime Video); Invincible (Prime Video); Ironheart (Disney+); The Sandman (Netflix) |
| Best Television Presentation or Limited Series | Best Animated Television Series or Special |
| The Walking Dead: Daryl Dixon (AMC); The Beast in Me (Netflix); Black Mirror (Netflix); Murderbot (Apple); Nautilus (Prime Video); The Pitt (HBO Max) | Predator: Killer of Killers (Hulu); Creature Commandos (HBO Max); Harley Quinn (HBO Max); Marvel Zombies (Disney+); Solo Leveling – Arise from the Shadow (Crunchyroll); Star Wars: Tales of the Underworld (Disney+); Your Friendly Neighborhood Spider-Man (Disney+) |
Best New Genre Television Series
Pluribus (Apple); Alien: Earth (FX); Outlander: Blood of My Blood (Starz); Robin Hood (MGM+); Spartacus: House of Ashur (Starz); Star Wars: Skeleton Crew (Disney+)

==== Acting ====
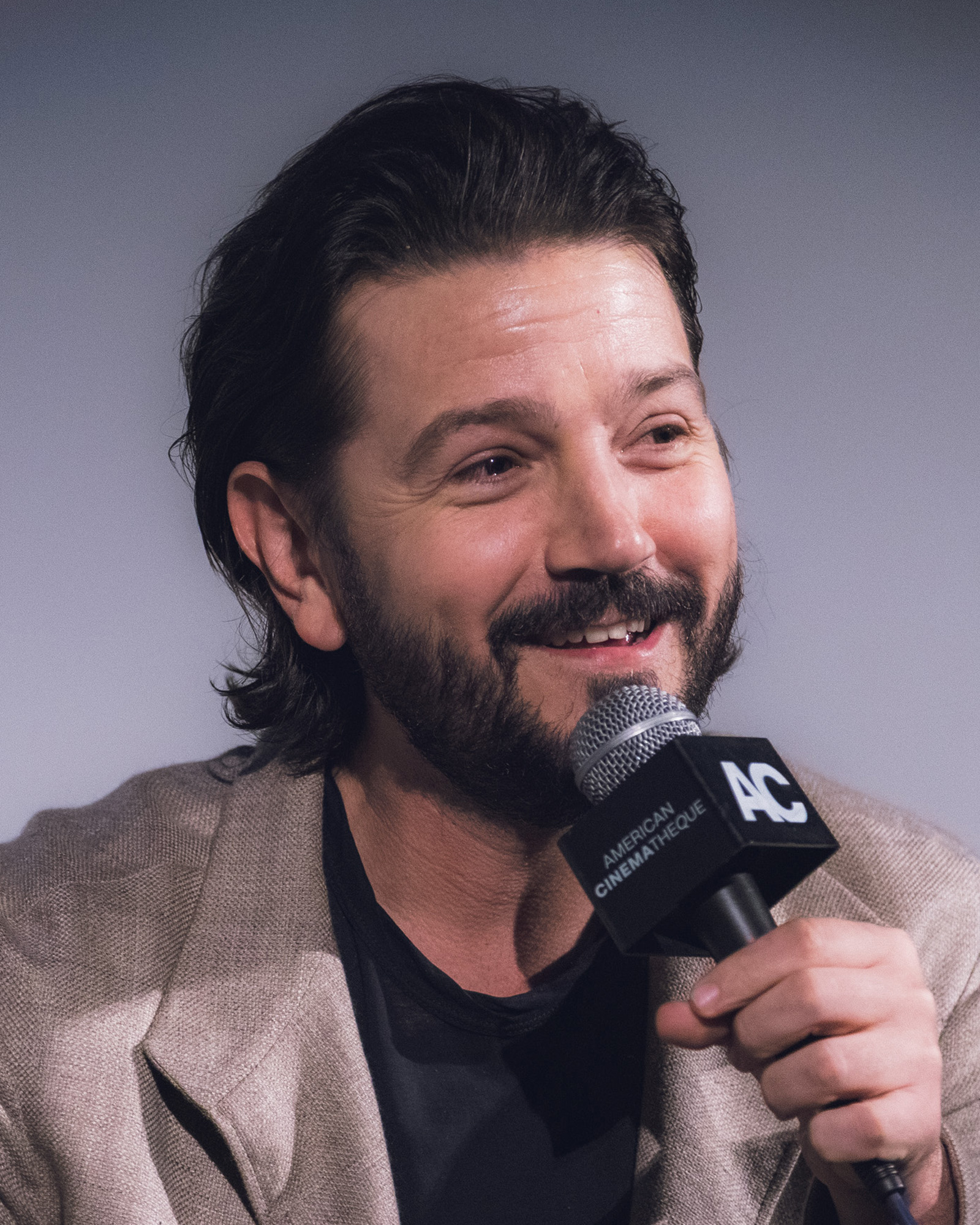
Diego Luna, Best Actor in a Television Series winner

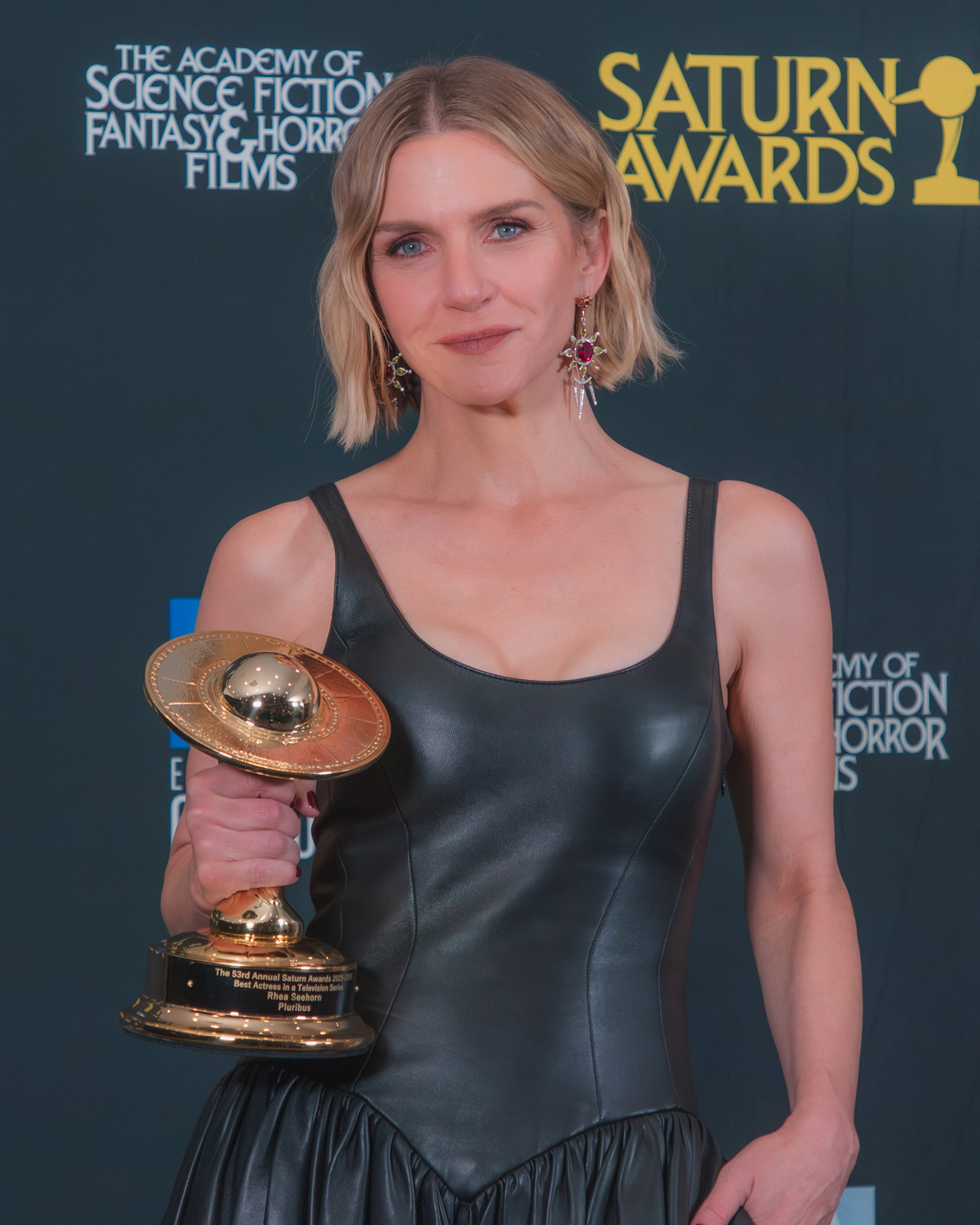
Rhea Seehorn, Best Actress in a Television Series winner

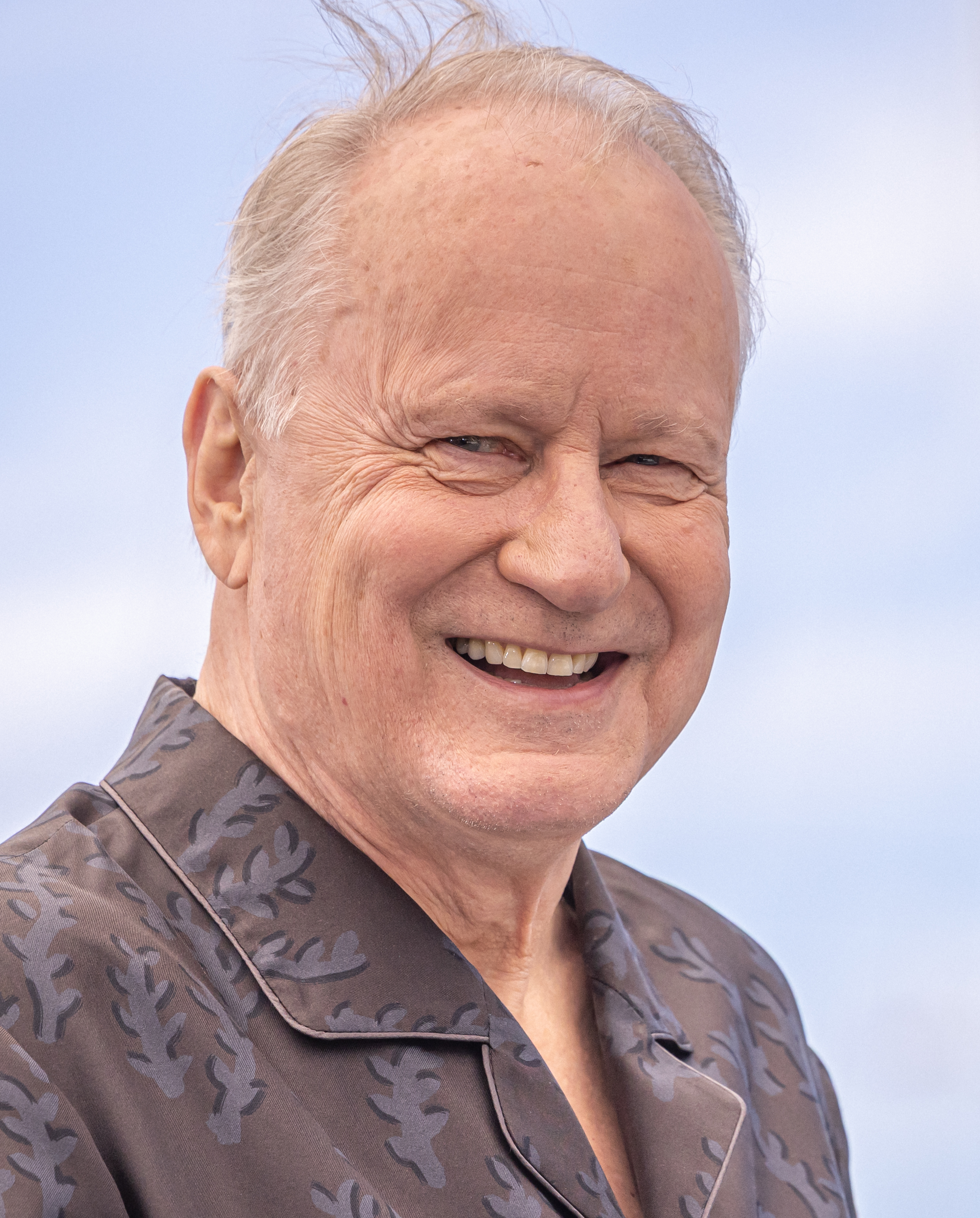
Stellan Skarsgård, Best Supporting Actor in a Television Series winner

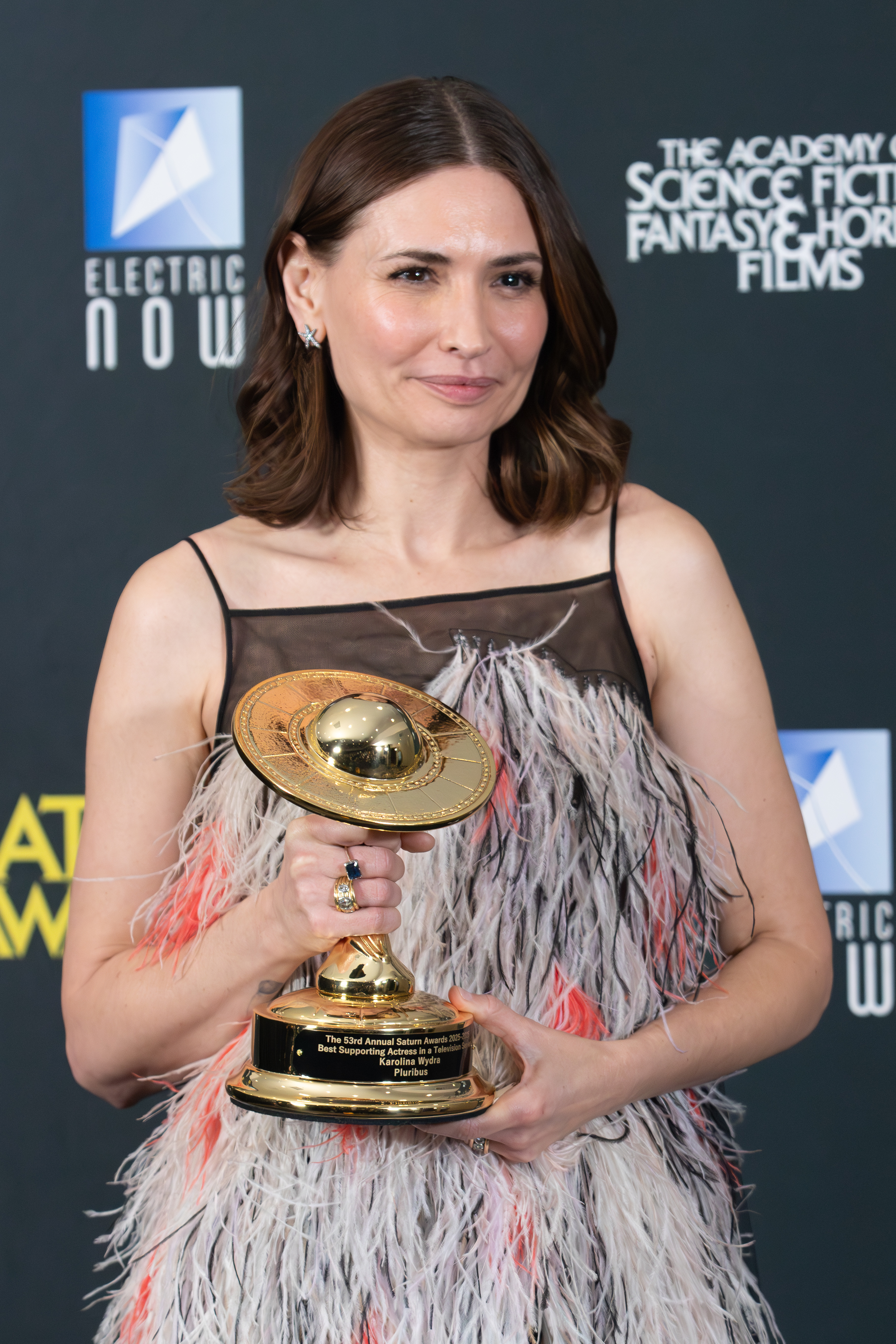
Karolina Wydra, Best Supporting Actress in a Television Series winner

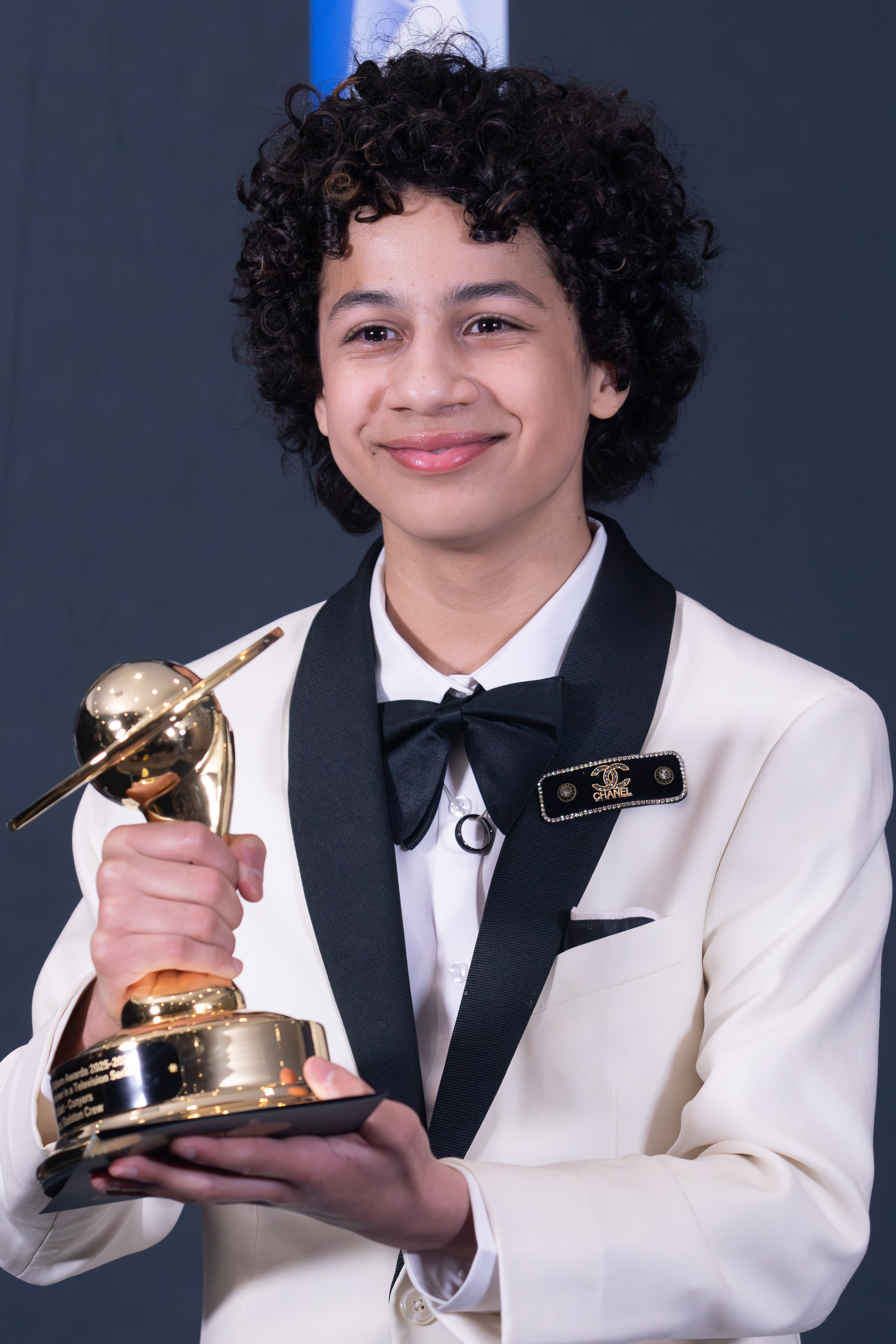
Ravi Cabot-Conyers, Best Young Performer in a Television Series winner

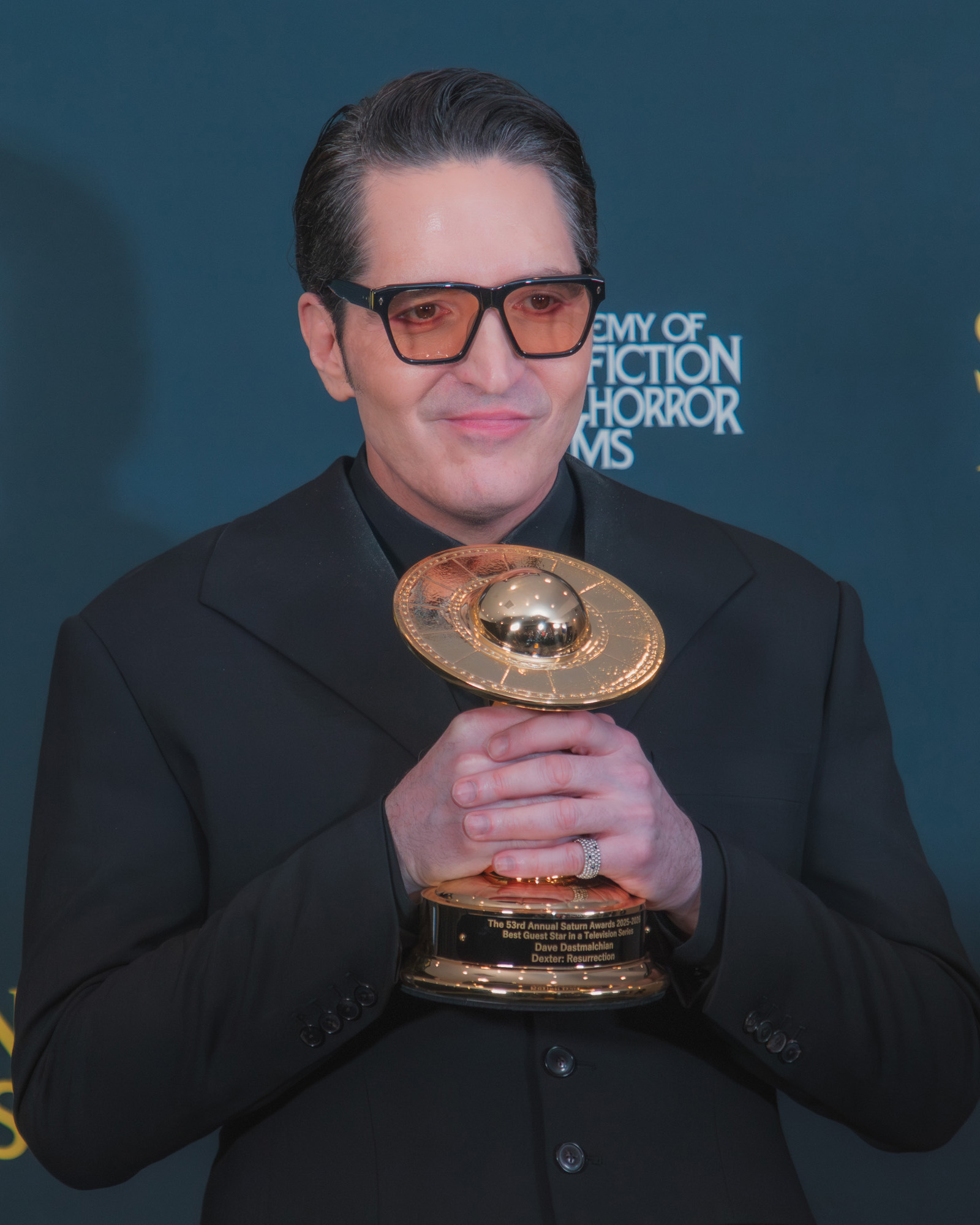
David Dastmalchian, Best Guest Star in a Television Series winner

| Best Actor in a Television Series | Best Actress in a Television Series |
|---|---|
| Diego Luna – Andor as Cassian Andor (Disney+); Sterling K. Brown – Paradise as Xavier Collins (Hulu); John Cena – Peacemaker as Chris Smith / Peacemaker (HBO Max); Michael C. Hall – Dexter: Resurrection as Dexter Morgan (Paramount+); Sam Heughan – Outlander as Jamie Fraser (Starz); Norman Reedus – The Walking Dead: Daryl Dixon as Daryl Dixon (AMC); Adam Scott – Severance as Mark Scout / Mark S. (Apple) | Rhea Seehorn – Pluribus as Carol Sturka (Apple); Caitríona Balfe – Outlander as Claire Fraser (Starz); Millie Bobby Brown – Stranger Things as Eleven (Netflix); Sydney Chandler – Alien: Earth as Wendy (FX); Britt Lower – Severance as Helena Eagan / Helly R. (Apple); Melissa McBride – The Walking Dead: Daryl Dixon as Carol Peletier (AMC); Jenna Ortega – Wednesday as Wednesday Addams (Netflix) |
| Best Supporting Actor in a Television Series | Best Supporting Actress in a Television Series |
| Stellan Skarsgård – Andor as Luthen Rael (Disney+); Jack Alcott – Dexter: Resurrection as Harrison Morgan (Paramount+); Babou Ceesay – Alien: Earth as Morrow (FX); William Fichtner – Anne Rice's Talamasca: The Secret Order as Jasper (AMC); Jude Law – Star Wars: Skeleton Crew as Jod Na Nawood (Disney+); James Marsden – Paradise as President Cal Bradford (Hulu); Ethan Peck – Star Trek: Strange New Worlds as Spock (Paramount+) | Karolina Wydra – Pluribus as Zosia (Apple); Christina Chong – Star Trek: Strange New Worlds as La'an Noonien Singh (Paramount+); Denise Gough – Andor as Dedra Meero (Disney+); Jennifer Holland – Peacemaker as Emilia Harcourt (HBO Max); Julianne Nicholson – Paradise as Samantha "Sinatra" Redmond (Hulu); Genevieve O'Reilly – Andor as Mon Mothma (Disney+); Uma Thurman – Dexter: Resurrection as Charley Brown (Paramount+) |
| Best Young Performer in a Television Series | Best Guest Star in a Television Series |
| Ravi Cabot-Conyers – Star Wars: Skeleton Crew as Wim (Disney+); Arian Cartaya – It: Welcome to Derry as Rich Santos (HBO); Joe Freeman – The Institute as Luke Ellis (MGM+); Noah Schnapp – Stranger Things as Will Byers (Netflix); Jaz Sinclair – Gen V as Marie Moreau (Prime Video); Sadie Sink – Stranger Things as Max Mayfield (Netflix); Clara Stack – It: Welcome to Derry as Lilly Bainbridge (HBO) | David Dastmalchian – Dexter: Resurrection as Gareth Pike (Paramount+); Peter Dinklage – Dexter: Resurrection as Leon Prater (Paramount+); Linda Hamilton – Stranger Things as Major General Dr. Kay (Netflix); James Remar – It: Welcome to Derry as Francis Shaw (HBO); Samba Schutte – Pluribus as Koumba Diabaté (Apple); Bill Skarsgård – It: Welcome to Derry as Pennywise (HBO); Paul Wesley – Star Trek: Strange New Worlds as James T. Kirk (Paramount+) |

=== Home Entertainment ===
| Best 4K Home Media Release | Best Classic Film Home Media Release |
|---|---|
| Wicked (Universal); The Fantastic Four: First Steps (Disney / Marvel); Mission: Impossible – The Final Reckoning (Paramount); Nightmare Alley (Criterion); Thunderbolts* (Disney / Marvel); When Evil Lurks (Second Sight Films) | Frailty (Lionsgate Home Video); Dead of Night (Kino Lorber); Kingdom of Heaven: Director's Cut (20th Century / Disney); Night of the Juggler (Kino Lorber); Night of the Living Dead 1990 (Sony); Re-Animator: 40th Anniversary (Ignite Films); Tombstone (Disney) |
| Best Film Home Media Collection Release | Best Television Home Media Release |
| The Pink Panther Peter Sellers Comedy Collection (Kino Lorber); 007: James Bond – Sean Connery: 6 Film Collection (Warner Bros.); The Abbott and Costello Horror Film Collection (Kino Lorber); A Nightmare on Elm Street: 7 Film Collection (Warner Bros.); Teenage Mutant Ninja Turtles Trilogy (Arrow); Terror in the Fog: The Wallace Krimi at CCC (Eureka) | Chucky: The Complete Series (Universal); Creepshow: The Complete Series (Shudder); The Huckleberry Hound Show: The Complete Original Series (Warner Archives); Knight Rider: The Complete Series (Universal); Peanuts: 75th Anniversary Ultimate TV Specials Collection (Warner Bros.); The Penguin: The Complete First Season (Warner Bros.) |

=== Special Achievement Awards ===
- Spotlight Award – The Boys
- Visionary Award – Christopher McQuarrie
- Robert Forster Artist's Award – Terry Matalas
- Lance Reddick Legacy Award – Titus Welliver
- Dr. Donald A. Reed Founder's Award – George Lucas
- George Pal Memorial Award – Aliens (for the 40th Anniversary)
- Saturn Hall of Fame Award – Star Trek (for the 60th Anniversary)

== Multiple nominations ==
Film
| Nominations | Film | Genre | Distributor(s) |
|---|---|---|---|
| 12 | Avatar: Fire and Ash | Science Fiction | 20th Century Studios / Lightstorm Entertainment |
| 12 | The Fantastic Four: First Steps | Cinematic Adaptation | Marvel Studios / Walt Disney Studios |
| 12 | Sinners | Thriller | Warner Bros. Pictures |
| 11 | Frankenstein | Horror | Netflix |
| 9 | Wicked: For Good | Fantasy | Universal Pictures |
| 8 | Superman | Cinematic Adaptation | DC Studios / Warner Bros. Pictures |
| 7 | Mission: Impossible – The Final Reckoning | Action / Adventure | Paramount Pictures |
| 5 | Dust Bunny | Fantasy | Lionsgate / Roadside Attractions |
| 5 | Predator: Badlands | Science Fiction | 20th Century Studios |
| 5 | Weapons | Horror | New Line Cinema / Warner Bros. Pictures |
| 3 | How to Train Your Dragon | Fantasy | DreamWorks / Universal Pictures |
| 3 | Thunderbolts* | Cinematic Adaptation | Marvel Studios / Walt Disney Studios |
| 3 | Tron: Ares | Science Fiction | Walt Disney Studios |
| 2 | 28 Years Later | Horror | Sony Pictures |
| 2 | Black Phone 2 | Cinematic Adaptation | Blumhouse / Universal Pictures |
| 2 | Bugonia | Science Fiction | Focus Features |
| 2 | The Life of Chuck | Fantasy | Neon |
| 2 | Lilo & Stitch | Fantasy | Walt Disney Studios |

Television
| Nominations | Series | Genre | Network |
|---|---|---|---|
| 6 | Dexter: Resurrection | Thriller | Paramount+ |
| 5 | Andor | Science Fiction | Disney+ |
| 5 | It: Welcome to Derry | Horror | HBO |
| 5 | Stranger Things | Fantasy | Netflix |
| 4 | Paradise | Action / Adventure | Hulu |
| 4 | Pluribus | Science Fiction | Apple |
| 4 | Star Trek: Strange New Worlds | Science Fiction | Paramount+ |
| 3 | Alien: Earth | Science Fiction | FX |
| 3 | Outlander | Fantasy | Starz |
| 3 | Peacemaker | Superhero | HBO Max |
| 3 | Severance | Science Fiction | Apple |
| 3 | Star Wars: Skeleton Crew | Science Fiction | Disney+ |
| 3 | The Walking Dead: Daryl Dixon | Horror | AMC |
| 2 | Anne Rice's Talamasca: The Secret Order | Horror | AMC |
| 2 | Gen V | Superhero | Prime Video |
| 2 | The Institute | Horror | MGM+ |
| 2 | Wednesday | Fantasy | Netflix |

== Multiple wins ==
Film
| Wins | Film | Genre | Distributor(s) |
|---|---|---|---|
| 5 | Avatar: Fire and Ash | Science Fiction | 20th Century Studios / Lightstorm Entertainment |
| 4 | Frankenstein | Horror | Netflix |
| 2 | Dust Bunny | Fantasy | Lionsgate / Roadside Attractions |
| 2 | The Fantastic Four: First Steps | Cinematic Adaptation | Marvel Studios / Walt Disney Studios |
| 2 | Mission: Impossible – The Final Reckoning | Action / Adventure | Paramount Pictures |
| 2 | Sinners | Thriller | Warner Bros. Pictures |

Television
| Wins | Series | Genre | Network |
|---|---|---|---|
| 3 | Andor | Science Fiction | Disney+ |
| 3 | Pluribus | Science Fiction | Apple |
| 2 | Dexter: Resurrection | Thriller | Paramount+ |
