= Saturn Award for Best Performance by a Younger Actor in a Television Series =

Annual US television award

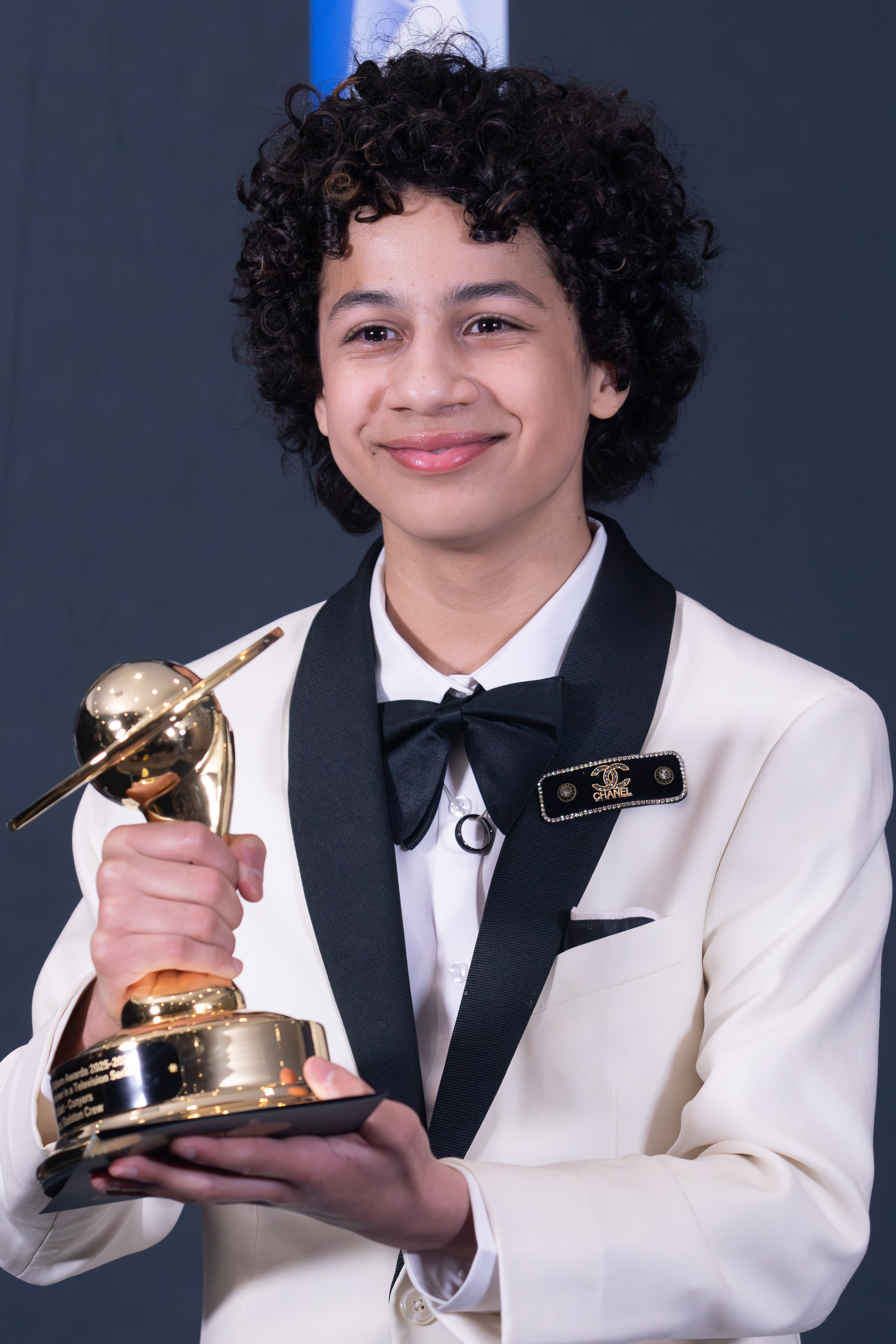
- The 2024/2025 recipient: Ravi Cabot-Conyers
- Awarded for: Best performance of the year by a young actor (male or female) in a genre television series
- Country: United States
- Presented by: Academy of Science Fiction, Fantasy and Horror Films
- First award: 2013
- Currently held by: Ravi Cabot-Conyers for Star Wars: Skeleton Crew (2024/2025)
- Website: www.saturnawards.org

The Saturn Award for Best Performance by a Younger Actor in a Television Series is one of the annual awards given by the American professional organization the Academy of Science Fiction, Fantasy and Horror Films. The Saturn Awards are the oldest film-specialized awards to reward science fiction, fantasy, and horror achievements (the Hugo Award for Best Dramatic Presentation, awarded by the World Science Fiction Society who reward science fiction and fantasy in various media, is the oldest award for science fiction and fantasy films).

The category, which specifically rewards young actors and actresses in television, was first introduced at the 40th Saturn Awards in 2013, where it was won by Chandler Riggs for his role as Carl Grimes in The Walking Dead. Riggs also leads with the most nominations in the category, with five, and he, Brec Bassinger, and Maisie Williams are the only performers to have won twice. Max Charles holds the record for most nominations without a win, with three.

At the 50th Anniversary Saturn Awards in 2022, the category was split to recognize performers in both network/cable series and streaming series; however, the categories were merged again at the subsequent 51st Saturn Awards.

== Winners and nominees ==
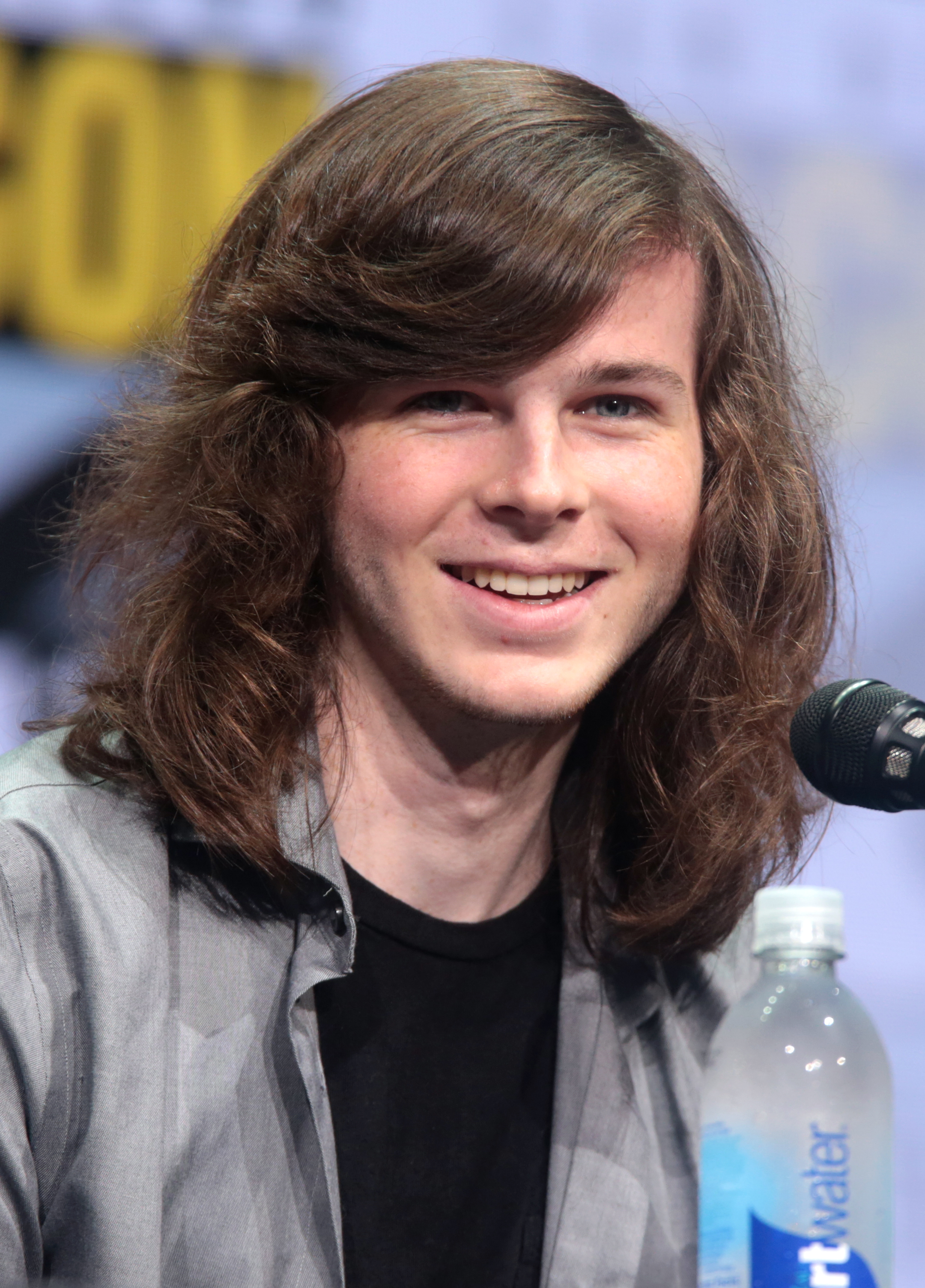
Inagurual recipient and three-time winner Chandler Riggs.

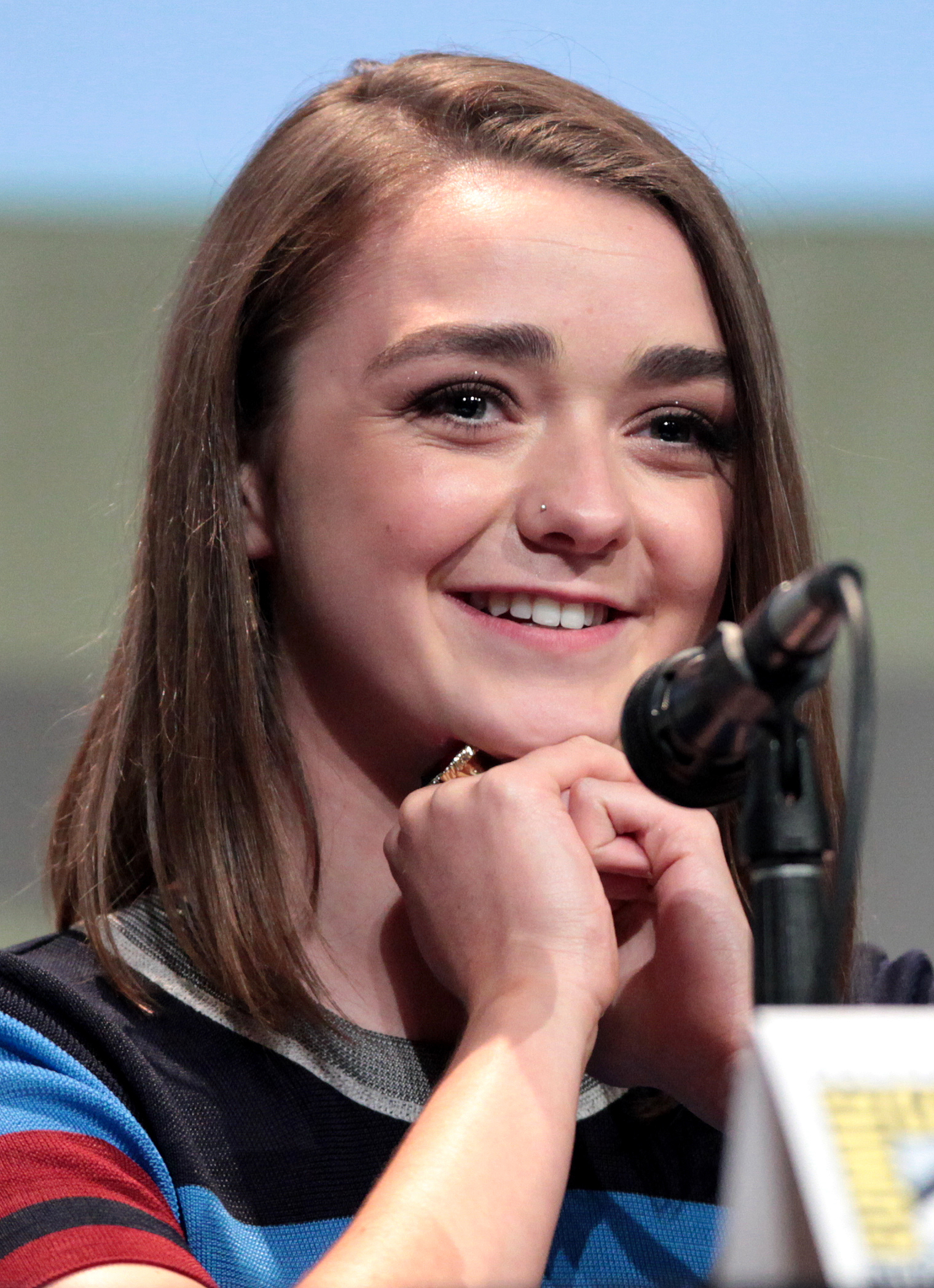
Two-time winner Maisie Williams.

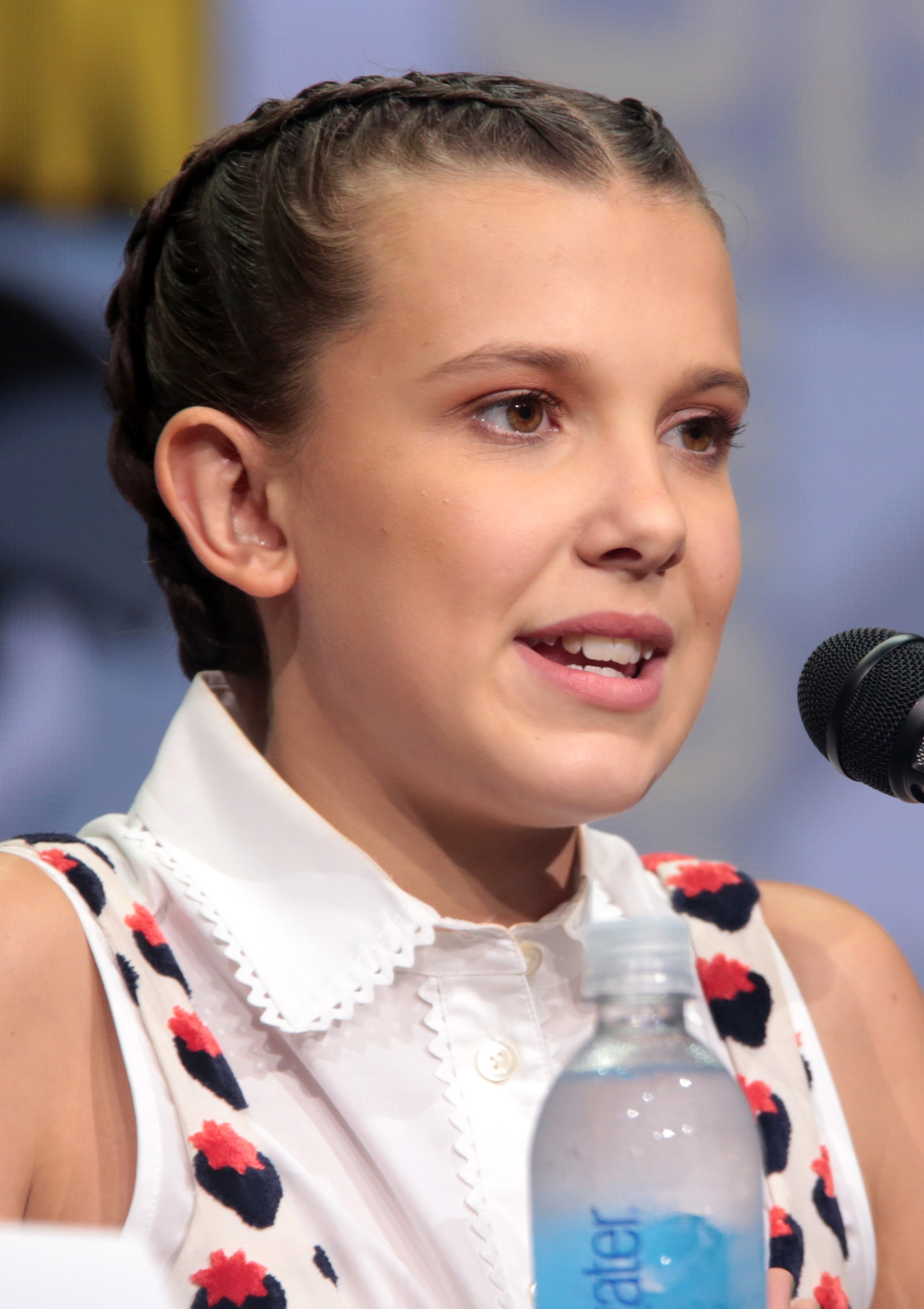
2016 recipient Millie Bobby Brown.

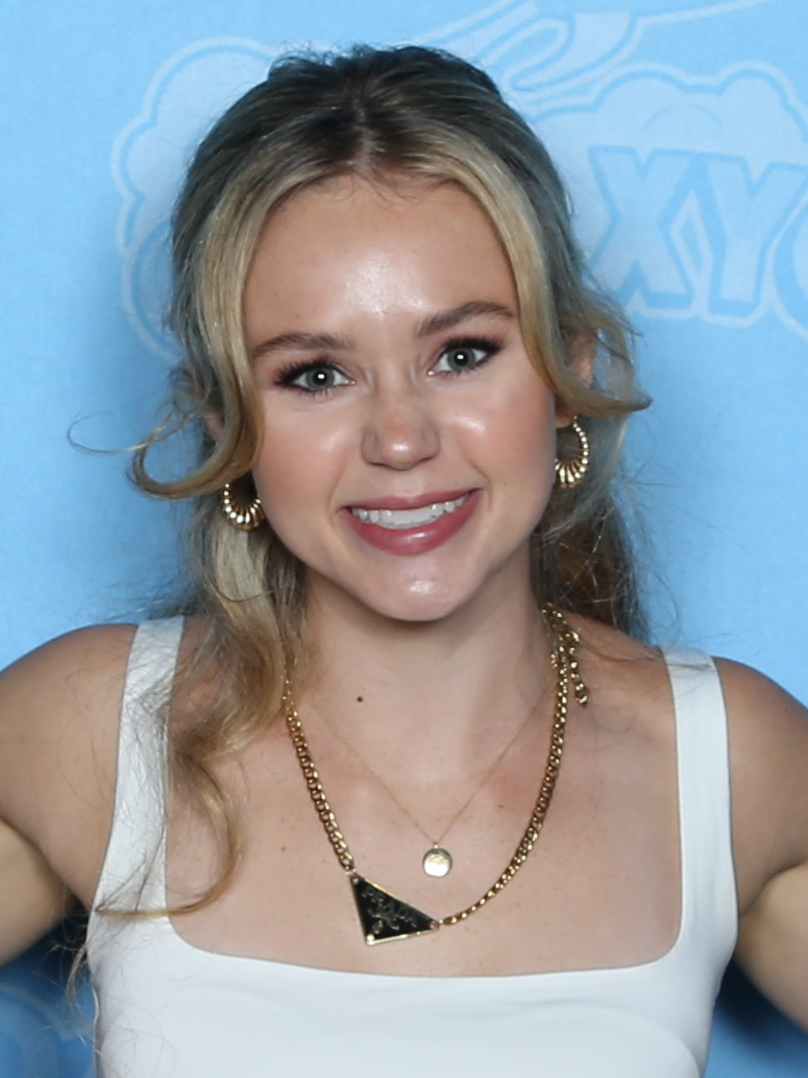
Brec Bassinger has won the award twice.

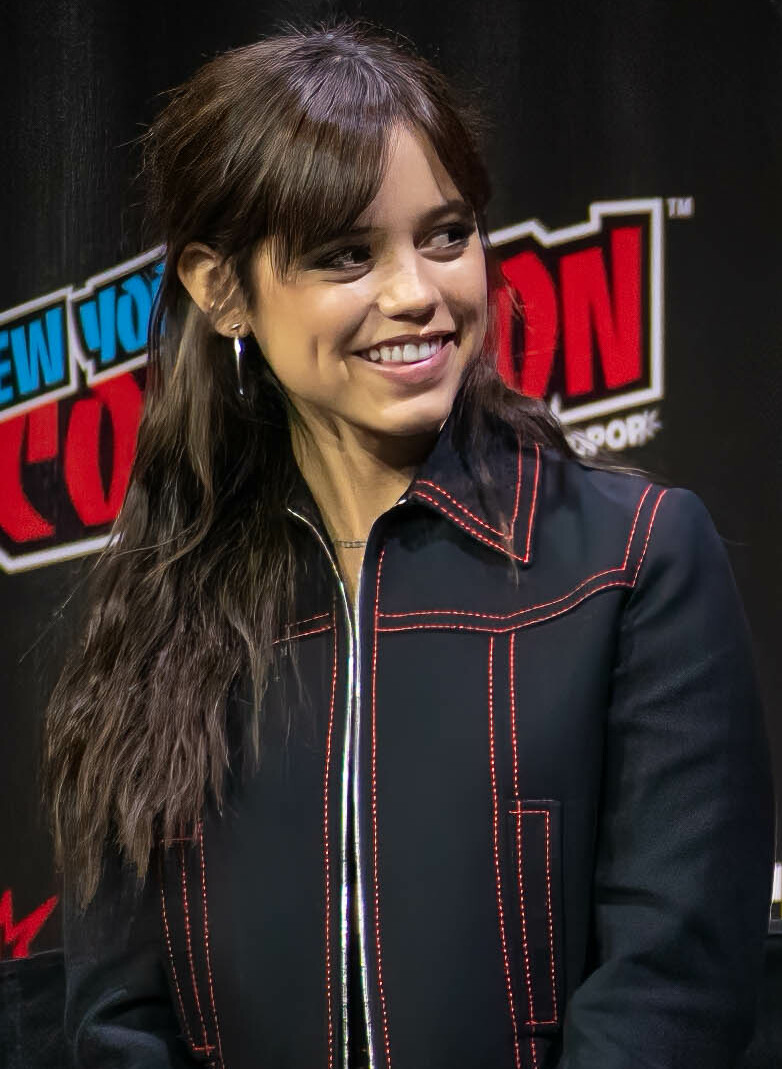
2023 recipient Jenna Ortega.

=== 2010s ===
Year	Actor/actress	Television program	Network	Character
2013 (40th)	Chandler Riggs	The Walking Dead	AMC	Carl Grimes
2013 (40th)	Colin Ford	Under the Dome	CBS	Joe McAlister
2013 (40th)	Jared S. Gilmore	Once Upon a Time	ABC	Henry Mills
2013 (40th)	Jack Gleeson	Game of Thrones	HBO	Joffrey Baratheon
2013 (40th)	Connor Jessup	Falling Skies	TNT	Ben Mason
2013 (40th)	Mackenzie Lintz	Under the Dome	CBS	Norrie Calvert-Hill
2014 (41st)	Maisie Williams	Game of Thrones	HBO	Arya Stark
2014 (41st)	Camren Bicondova	Gotham	Fox	Selina Kyle
2014 (41st)	Maxim Knight	Falling Skies	TNT	Matt Mason
2014 (41st)	Tyler Posey	Teen Wolf	MTV	Scott McCall
2014 (41st)	Chandler Riggs	The Walking Dead	AMC	Carl Grimes
2014 (41st)	Holly Taylor	The Americans	FX	Paige Jennings
2015 (42nd)	Chandler Riggs	The Walking Dead	AMC	Carl Grimes
2015 (42nd)	Max Charles	The Strain	FX	Zach Goodweather
2015 (42nd)	Frank Dillane	Fear the Walking Dead	AMC	Nick Clark
2015 (42nd)	Jodelle Ferland	Dark Matter	Syfy	Five
2015 (42nd)	Brenock O'Connor	Game of Thrones	HBO	Olly
2015 (42nd)	Dylan Sprayberry	Teen Wolf	MTV	Liam Dunbar
2015 (42nd)	Maisie Williams	Game of Thrones	HBO	Arya Stark
2016 (43rd)	Millie Bobby Brown	Stranger Things	Netflix	Eleven
2016 (43rd)	KJ Apa	Riverdale	The CW	Archie Andrews
2016 (43rd)	Max Charles	The Strain	FX	Zach Goodweather
2016 (43rd)	Alycia Debnam-Carey	Fear the Walking Dead	AMC	Alicia Clark
2016 (43rd)	Lorenzo James Henrie	Fear the Walking Dead	AMC	Christopher Manawa
2016 (43rd)	Chandler Riggs	The Walking Dead	AMC	Carl Grimes
2017 (44th)	Chandler Riggs	The Walking Dead	AMC	Carl Grimes
2017 (44th)	KJ Apa	Riverdale	The CW	Archie Andrews
2017 (44th)	Millie Bobby Brown	Stranger Things	Netflix	Eleven
2017 (44th)	Max Charles	The Strain	FX	Zach Goodweather
2017 (44th)	Alycia Debnam-Carey	Fear the Walking Dead	AMC	Alicia Clark
2017 (44th)	David Mazouz	Gotham	Fox	Bruce Wayne
2017 (44th)	Lili Reinhart	Riverdale	The CW	Betty Cooper
2017 (44th)	Cole Sprouse	Riverdale	The CW	Jughead Jones
2018/2019 (45th)	Maisie Williams	Game of Thrones	HBO	Arya Stark
2018/2019 (45th)	KJ Apa	Riverdale	The CW	Archie Andrews
2018/2019 (45th)	Tosin Cole	Doctor Who	BBC America	Ryan Sinclair
2018/2019 (45th)	Cameron Cuffe	Krypton	Syfy	Seg-El
2018/2019 (45th)	David Mazouz	Gotham	Fox	Bruce Wayne
2018/2019 (45th)	Cole Sprouse	Riverdale	The CW	Jughead Jones
2018/2019 (45th)	Benjamin Wadsworth	Deadly Class	Syfy	Marcus Lopez Arguello
2019/2020 (46th)	Brec Bassinger	Stargirl	DC Universe	Courtney Whitmore / Stargirl
2019/2020 (46th)	Freya Allan	The Witcher	Netflix	Princess Ciri
2019/2020 (46th)	Isa Briones	Star Trek: Picard	CBS All Access	Dahj / Soji Asha / Sutra (androids)
2019/2020 (46th)	Maxwell Jenkins	Lost in Space	Netflix	Will Robinson
2019/2020 (46th)	Madison Lintz	Bosch	Amazon Prime Video	Madeline "Maddie" Bosch
2019/2020 (46th)	Cassady McClincy	The Walking Dead	AMC	Lydia: Alpha's daughter
2019/2020 (46th)	Erin Moriarty	The Boys	Amazon Prime Video	Annie January / Starlight

=== 2020s ===
Year	Actor/actress	Television program	Network	Character
2021/2022 (50th)	Network/cable			
2021/2022 (50th)	Brec Bassinger	Stargirl	The CW	Courtney Whitmore / Stargirl
2021/2022 (50th)	Jack Alcott	Dexter: New Blood	Showtime	Harrison Morgan
2021/2022 (50th)	Zackary Arthur	Chucky	Syfy	Jake Wheeler
2021/2022 (50th)	Gus Birney	Shining Vale	Starz	Gaynor Phelps
2021/2022 (50th)	Jordan Elsass	Superman & Lois	The CW	Jonathan Kent
2021/2022 (50th)	Alex Garfin	Superman & Lois	The CW	Jordan Kent
2021/2022 (50th)	Streaming			
2021/2022 (50th)	Iman Vellani	Ms. Marvel	Disney+	Kamala Khan / Ms. Marvel
2021/2022 (50th)	Vivien Lyra Blair	Obi-Wan Kenobi	Disney+	Princess Leia
2021/2022 (50th)	Maxwell Jenkins	Lost in Space	Netflix	Will Robinson
2021/2022 (50th)	Gaten Matarazzo	Stranger Things	Netflix	Dustin Henderson
2021/2022 (50th)	Sadie Sink	Stranger Things	Netflix	Max Mayfield
2021/2022 (50th)	Hailee Steinfeld	Hawkeye	Disney+	Kate Bishop
2022/2023 (51st)	Jenna Ortega	Wednesday	Netflix	Wednesday Addams
2022/2023 (51st)	Milly Alcock	House of the Dragon	HBO	Young Princess Rhaenyra Targaryen
2022/2023 (51st)	Freya Allan	The Witcher	Netflix	Ciri
2022/2023 (51st)	Zackary Arthur	Chucky	Syfy	Jake Wheeler
2022/2023 (51st)	Brec Bassinger	Stargirl	The CW	Courtney Whitmore / Stargirl
2022/2023 (51st)	Bella Ramsey	The Last of Us	HBO	Ellie
2022/2023 (51st)	Igby Rigney	The Midnight Club	Netflix	Kevin
2023/2024 (52nd)	Xolo Maridueña	Cobra Kai	Netflix	Miguel Diaz
2023/2024 (52nd)	Zackary Arthur	Chucky	Syfy	Jake Wheeler
2023/2024 (52nd)	Hannah Cheramy	From	MGM+	Julie Matthews
2023/2024 (52nd)	Cameron Crovetti	The Boys	Amazon Prime Video	Ryan
2023/2024 (52nd)	Rhenzy Feliz	The Penguin	Max	Victor "Vic" Aguilar
2023/2024 (52nd)	Joe Locke	Agatha All Along	Disney+	Billy Maximoff / William Kaplan
2023/2024 (52nd)	Louis Puech Scigliuzzi	The Walking Dead: Daryl Dixon	AMC	Laurent Carriere
2024/2025 (53rd)	Ravi Cabot-Conyers	Star Wars: Skeleton Crew	Disney+	Wim
2024/2025 (53rd)	Arian Cartaya	It: Welcome to Derry	HBO	Rich Santos
2024/2025 (53rd)	Joe Freeman	The Institute	MGM+	Luke Ellis
2024/2025 (53rd)	Noah Schnapp	Stranger Things	Netflix	Will Byers
2024/2025 (53rd)	Jaz Sinclair	Gen V	Amazon Prime Video	Marie Moreau
2024/2025 (53rd)	Sadie Sink	Stranger Things	Netflix	Max Mayfield
2024/2025 (53rd)	Clara Stack	It: Welcome to Derry	HBO	Lilly Bainbridge

== Multiple nominations ==
5 nominations

- Chandler Riggs

3 nominations

- Zackary Arthur
- Brec Bassinger
- Max Charles
- Maisie Williams

2 nominations

- Freya Allan
- KJ Apa
- Millie Bobby Brown
- Alycia Debnam-Carey
- David Mazouz
- Sadie Sink

== Multiple wins ==
3 wins

- Chandler Riggs

2 wins

- Brec Bassinger
- Maisie Williams
