= Simone Miller =

Canadian actress and singer (born 2005)

- Born: 22 September 2005 (age 20); Toronto, Canada
- Occupations: Actress, Singer
- Years active: 2015–
- Television: The Institute

Simone Miller (born 22 September 2005) is a Canadian television and film actress and singer.

== Career ==
=== Acting ===
Miller was born in September 2005 and was a child actress, and has been acting since she was ten years-old. She had early television appearances on The Big Fun Crafty Show on Universal Kids and Snapshots on CBC Television. She had early roles on commercials for bands such as The Shopping Channel and The Wall Street Journal.

Miller appeared as student Raign Westbrook in Canadian television series Detention Adventure on CBC and HBO Max, about school children who deliberately get detention to investigate school secrets, returning to the show for second and third series. She also had the role of a young Dorinda Clark-Cole in biographical film The Clark Sisters: First Ladies of Gospel (2020). Miller appeared in multiple seasons of Canadian television series Run the Burbs as Mannix. She also had roles in Workin' Mums and animated PBS children’s series Pinkalicious & Peterrific.

In 2025, Miller could be seen as Kalisha in the first series of Stephen King supernatural television horror adaptation The Institute for MGM+, appearing alongside Joe Freeman, Ben Barnes and Mary-Louise Parker.

=== Music ===
As a teenager she also released music as a singer-songwriter, and co-directed the music video for her song Older when she was 16 years-old. She has opened for established Canadian musical acts such as Arkells and Blue Rodeo.

== Personal life ==
From Toronto, Miller has both Italian and Jamaican heritage and has completed voluntary work with the Jamaican Canadian Association. She has trained in kickboxing and as well as singing, plays guitar and ukulele.

== Filmography ==
Year	Title	Role	Notes
2018-2022	Space Dragon and Kim	Hawkins	
2019-2022	Detention Adventure	Raign Westbrook	28 episodes
2020	The Clark Sisters: First Ladies of Gospel	Young Dorinda	Film
2021	Workin' Mums	Lauren	2 episodes
2022	Pinkalicious & Peterrific	Indigo	
2022-2024	Run the Burbs	Mannix	13 episodes
2025	The Institute	Kalisha	8 episodes
