= Saturn Award for Best Horror Television Series =

Annual US television award

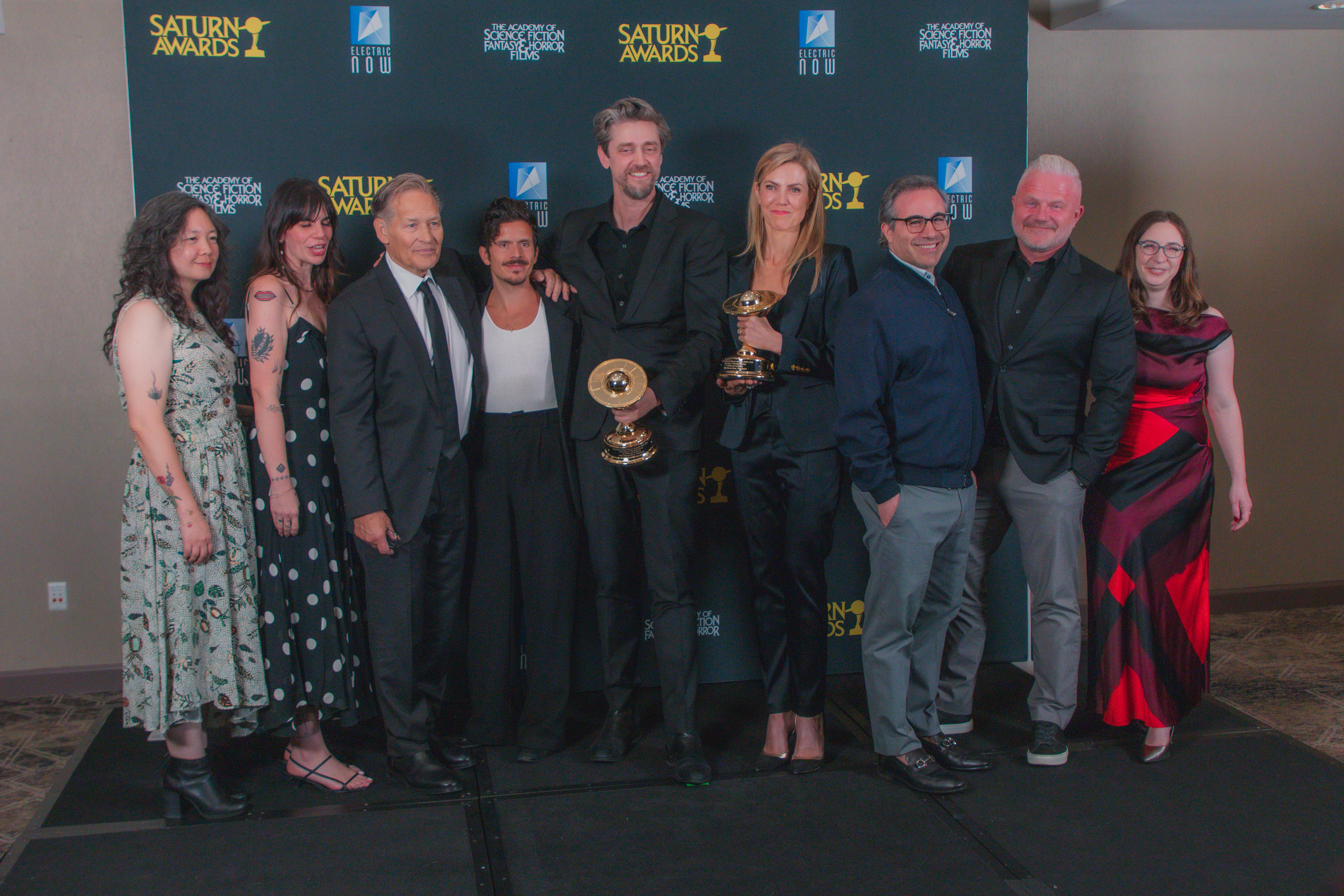
- The 2024/2025 recipients for It: Welcome to Derry
- Awarded for: Best television series of the year in the horror genre
- Country: United States
- Presented by: Academy of Science Fiction, Fantasy and Horror Films
- First award: 2016
- Currently held by: It: Welcome to Derry (2024/2025)
- Website: www.saturnawards.org

The Saturn Award for Best Horror Television Series is one of the annual awards given by the Academy of Science Fiction, Fantasy and Horror Films. The Saturn Awards, which are the oldest film and series-specialized awards to reward science fiction, fantasy, and horror achievements, included the category for the first time at the 42nd Saturn Awards ceremony, when the Saturn Award went through major changes in their television categories. It specifically rewards horror on television.

The Walking Dead was the only series to win from the award's introduction in 2016 until 2024, when The Last of Us won. The award received a sister category for streaming series in the horror and thriller genres in 2019 and 2021, awarded to Stranger Things in both years.

== Winners and nominees ==
The winners are listed in bold.

(NOTE: Year refers to year of eligibility, the actual ceremonies are held the following year)

=== 2010s ===
Year	TV Series	Network
2015 **(42nd)**	**The Walking Dead**	**AMC**
2015 **(42nd)**	American Horror Story: Hotel	FX
2015 **(42nd)**	Ash vs Evil Dead	Starz
2015 **(42nd)**	Fear the Walking Dead	AMC
2015 **(42nd)**	Salem	WGN America
2015 **(42nd)**	The Strain	FX
2015 **(42nd)**	Teen Wolf	MTV
2016 **(43rd)**	**The Walking Dead**	**AMC**
2016 **(43rd)**	American Horror Story: Roanoke	FX
2016 **(43rd)**	Ash vs Evil Dead	Starz
2016 **(43rd)**	The Exorcist	Fox
2016 **(43rd)**	Fear the Walking Dead	AMC
2016 **(43rd)**	Teen Wolf	MTV
2016 **(43rd)**	The Vampire Diaries	The CW
2017 **(44th)**	**The Walking Dead**	**AMC**
2017 **(44th)**	American Horror Story: Cult	FX
2017 **(44th)**	Ash vs Evil Dead	Starz
2017 **(44th)**	Fear the Walking Dead	AMC
2017 **(44th)**	Preacher	AMC
2017 **(44th)**	The Strain	FX
2017 **(44th)**	Teen Wolf	MTV
2018/2019 **(45th)**	Network / Cable	
2018/2019 **(45th)**	**The Walking Dead**	**AMC**
2018/2019 **(45th)**	American Horror Story: Apocalypse	FX
2018/2019 **(45th)**	A Discovery of Witches	AMC
2018/2019 **(45th)**	Fear the Walking Dead	AMC
2018/2019 **(45th)**	NOS4A2	AMC
2018/2019 **(45th)**	Preacher	AMC
2018/2019 **(45th)**	Supernatural	The CW
2018/2019 **(45th)**	What We Do in the Shadows	FX
2018/2019 **(45th)**	Streaming	
2018/2019 **(45th)**	**Stranger Things**	**Netflix**
2018/2019 **(45th)**	Castle Rock	Hulu
2018/2019 **(45th)**	Chilling Adventures of Sabrina	Netflix
2018/2019 **(45th)**	The Handmaid's Tale	Hulu
2018/2019 **(45th)**	The Haunting of Hill House	Netflix
2018/2019 **(45th)**	The Twilight Zone	CBS All Access
2018/2019 **(45th)**	You	Netflix
2019/2020 **(46th)**	**The Walking Dead**	**AMC**
2019/2020 **(46th)**	Creepshow	Shudder
2019/2020 **(46th)**	Evil	CBS
2019/2020 **(46th)**	Fear the Walking Dead	AMC
2019/2020 **(46th)**	Lovecraft Country	HBO
2019/2020 **(46th)**	Servant	Apple TV+
2019/2020 **(46th)**	What We Do in the Shadows	FX

=== 2020s ===
Year	TV Series	Network
2021/2022 **(50th)**	Network / Cable	
2021/2022 **(50th)**	**The Walking Dead**	**AMC**
2021/2022 **(50th)**	American Horror Story: Double Feature	FX
2021/2022 **(50th)**	Chucky	Syfy
2021/2022 **(50th)**	Fear the Walking Dead	AMC
2021/2022 **(50th)**	From	Epix
2021/2022 **(50th)**	What We Do in the Shadows	FX
2021/2022 **(50th)**	Streaming	
2021/2022 **(50th)**	**Stranger Things**	**Netflix**
2021/2022 **(50th)**	Creepshow	Shudder
2021/2022 **(50th)**	Evil	Paramount+
2021/2022 **(50th)**	Servant	Apple TV+
2021/2022 **(50th)**	Severance	Apple TV+
2021/2022 **(50th)**	Squid Game	Netflix
2022/2023 **(51st)**	**The Last of Us**	**HBO**
2022/2023 **(51st)**	American Horror Story: Delicate	FX
2022/2023 **(51st)**	Chucky	Syfy
2022/2023 **(51st)**	Fear the Walking Dead	AMC
2022/2023 **(51st)**	From	MGM+
2022/2023 **(51st)**	Interview with the Vampire	AMC
2022/2023 **(51st)**	What We Do in the Shadows	FX
2023/2024 **(52nd)**	**From**	**MGM+**
2023/2024 **(52nd)**	Creepshow	Shudder
2023/2024 **(52nd)**	Evil	Paramount+
2023/2024 **(52nd)**	Grotesquerie	FX
2023/2024 **(52nd)**	Interview with the Vampire	AMC
2023/2024 **(52nd)**	Teacup	Peacock
2023/2024 **(52nd)**	The Walking Dead: Daryl Dixon	AMC
2024/2025 **(53rd)**	**It: Welcome to Derry**	**HBO**
2024/2025 **(53rd)**	The Institute	MGM+
2024/2025 **(53rd)**	The Last of Us	HBO
2024/2025 **(53rd)**	Talamasca: The Secret Order	AMC
2024/2025 **(53rd)**	The Walking Dead: Dead City	AMC
2024/2025 **(53rd)**	Yellowjackets	Showtime

== Most nominations ==
- 7 nominations –Fear the Walking Dead
- 6 nominations –American Horror Story, The Walking Dead
- 4 nominations – What We Do in the Shadows
- 3 nominations – Ash vs Evil Dead, Teen Wolf, From
- 2 nominations – Creepshow, Chucky, Evil, Preacher, Servant, Stranger Things, The Strain

== Most wins ==
- 6 wins – The Walking Dead
- 2 wins – Stranger Things
