= The Institute (King novel) =

2019 novel by Stephen King

- First edition U.S. cover
- Author: Stephen King
- Audio read by: Santino Fontana
- Cover artist: Will Staehle
- Language: English
- Genre: Horror thriller, science fiction
- Published: September 10, 2019
- Publisher: Scribner
- Publication place: United States
- Media type: Print (hardcover)
- Pages: 576
- ISBN: 978-1-982110-56-7
- Dewey Decimal: 813/.54
- LC Class: PS3561.I483 I57 2019

The Institute is a 2019 American science fiction-horror novel by Stephen King, published by Scribner. The book follows twelve-year-old genius Luke Ellis. When his parents are murdered, he is kidnapped by intruders and awakens in the Institute, a facility that houses other abducted children who have telepathy or telekinesis. The Institute was published on September 10, 2019, and met with generally positive reviews.

A television adaptation of the novel, directed by Jack Bender, premiered on MGM+ on July 13, 2025.

== Plot ==
Tim Jamieson leaves his job in Florida and prepares to head to New York. En route, he gives up a seat on a plane and finds himself in the small town of DuPray, South Carolina. A decorated former policeman, Tim takes a job as a local patrolman and soon develops a relationship with a deputy, Wendy Gullickson.

Another storyline begins in suburban Minneapolis with Luke Ellis, a twelve-year-old intellectual prodigy with mild telekinetic abilities. One night, intruders silently murder Luke's parents and kidnap him. He wakes up in a room almost identical to his own at "the Institute", a facility secretly located deep in the forests of Maine. The Institute houses a number of other kidnapped children, each with telekinesis or/and telepathy. Luke befriends several other kids: Kalisha Benson, Nick Wilholm, George Iles, Iris Stanhope, Helen Simms and later ten-year-old Avery Dixon, in the area known as Front Half.

The staff of the Institute, led by director Mrs. Sigsby, are dedicated to extracting the special talents from the children–known as TPs (telepaths) and TKs (telekinetics). Experiments and torture are performed on the children to try to enhance their superhuman talents, as well as to awaken TP abilities in TKs and vice versa. Once the experiments are done, the children "graduate" to Back Half. None of the children who have gone to Back Half have ever been seen again. Luke begins to develop weak TP abilities due to the experimentation but keeps it secret. After Kalisha graduates to Back Half, she is able to send telepathic messages to Avery, an advanced TP. Luke comes to believe that in Back Half, the children's collective abilities are weaponized for assassinations until the strain kills them. Luke becomes desperate to escape and get help before he graduates.

Maureen Alvorson, a housekeeper at the Institute, is also an informant for Mrs. Sigsby, but her financial issues cause her to seek help from Luke. She helps Luke escape the Institute, then commits suicide in order to help hide his disappearance. The Institute's deteriorated security takes almost a day to realize Luke's escape, by which time he has found himself on a train and jumped off in DuPray. A hotel owner in DuPray who is on the payroll of the Institute informs them that Luke is in town. Meanwhile, Luke manages to convince Tim, Wendy and other police officers of his story and gives the Sheriff a USB stick containing a confession from Maureen, along with a harrowing video taken secretly in Back Half. Staffers from the Institute arrive in DuPray. Following a shoot-out, several officers and all but Mrs. Sigsby and a doctor from the Institute are killed. Tim and Luke take the captured Mrs. Sigsby back to the Institute where her second-in-command, Trevor Stackhouse, tries to ambush them. Since Tim made Mrs. Sigsby drive the car, the Institute's guards mistakenly kill her.

While Luke has been away, several Back Half children, including Avery (who was sent to Back Half as punishment for helping Luke escape), round up those who have been in Back Half for longer, and whose minds are almost completely broken, and plan a revolution. Stackhouse gives orders to kill them using poison gas created by mixing the facility's cleaning chemicals. As the gas is released, Avery, Kalisha, Iris, George, Nick, Helen and the others join and fight back, managing to levitate areas of the Institute into the air. Kalisha, George, Nick and Helen escape, but the others, including Avery, are killed when the corridor they are trapped in collapses. The remaining Institute staff are all killed or flee, and Tim takes Luke and his surviving friends back with him to DuPray.

Months later, the survivors are visited by the supervisor of the Institute, who speaks with a vague lisp and explains that the children were being used to combat people that the Institute’s precogs had foreseen as threats to the safety of the entire world. The Institute is just one of several around the world, but all of them have had revolutions at the same time, apparently all telepathically coordinated by Avery. Luke argues with the man about the possibility of predicting the distant future, claiming that precogs can only accurately predict occurrences that happen in the near future, as there are too many variables involved over long time spans. The lisping man leaves Luke and his friends alone for the promise that the USB stick will not become public knowledge; the USB stick is kept hidden in a safe, with each of the surviving children holding a key.

The other kids slowly return to their homes, but Luke remains in DuPray with Tim and Wendy, and the novel ends with Luke thinking about what a little hero Avery was.

== Reception ==
Publishers Weekly gave the novel a rave review, writing, "King wows with the most gut-wrenching tale of kids triumphing over evil since It [...] Tapping into the minds of the young characters, King creates a sense of menace and intimacy that will have readers spellbound [...] Not a word is wasted in this meticulously crafted novel, which once again proves why King is the king of horror." Kirkus Reviews praised the book, though commented that it wasn't as scary as some of King's other work, saying, "King fans won't be disappointed, though most will likely prefer the scarier likes of The Shining and It." Booklist's Carl Hays praised the novel, saying, "King devotees will, of course, devour this latest suspenseful page-turner, but any reader looking for a smart thriller about an unusual black ops organization will find this compelling and rewarding. With his usual blend of plot twists and vividly drawn characters, King remains at the top of his game."

Writing for The Sunday Times, John Dugdale called it "a captivating, hybrid novel" but questioned its meaning, saying, "What it all adds up to, though, is unclear." Talking of Mrs. Sigsby and the people at the Institution, Laura Miller of The New York Times said, "Of all the cosmic menaces that King’s heroes have battled, this slow creep into inhumanity may be the most terrifying yet because it is all too real." In January 2020, Truly Hunter said, "Fans of Stephen King will likely fall in love with this book. If readers are looking for something new that feels like classic King, this is the book to pick up. It is a new take on an old premise with a classic Stephen King spin. The novel has everything King readers have come to expect and it could be the one recent King release that stands as a new classic from the author," however criticized the book's length. King noted connections between the novel and some of President Donald Trump's actions, including "Children, seeking asylum at the border ... being removed from their parents under the administration’s family separation policy."

== Television adaptation ==
On the novel's publication date, it was announced that the television rights were secured by Spyglass Television for a limited series, with David E. Kelley writing, Jack Bender directing, and both Kelley and Bender executive producing. In June 2024, it was announced that MGM+ had ordered an 8-episode television series adaptation of the novel with Ben Barnes and Mary-Louise Parker set to star. In August 2025, it was announced that MGM+ had ordered a second 8-episode season of the series.
