= Ravi Cabot-Conyers =

American actor

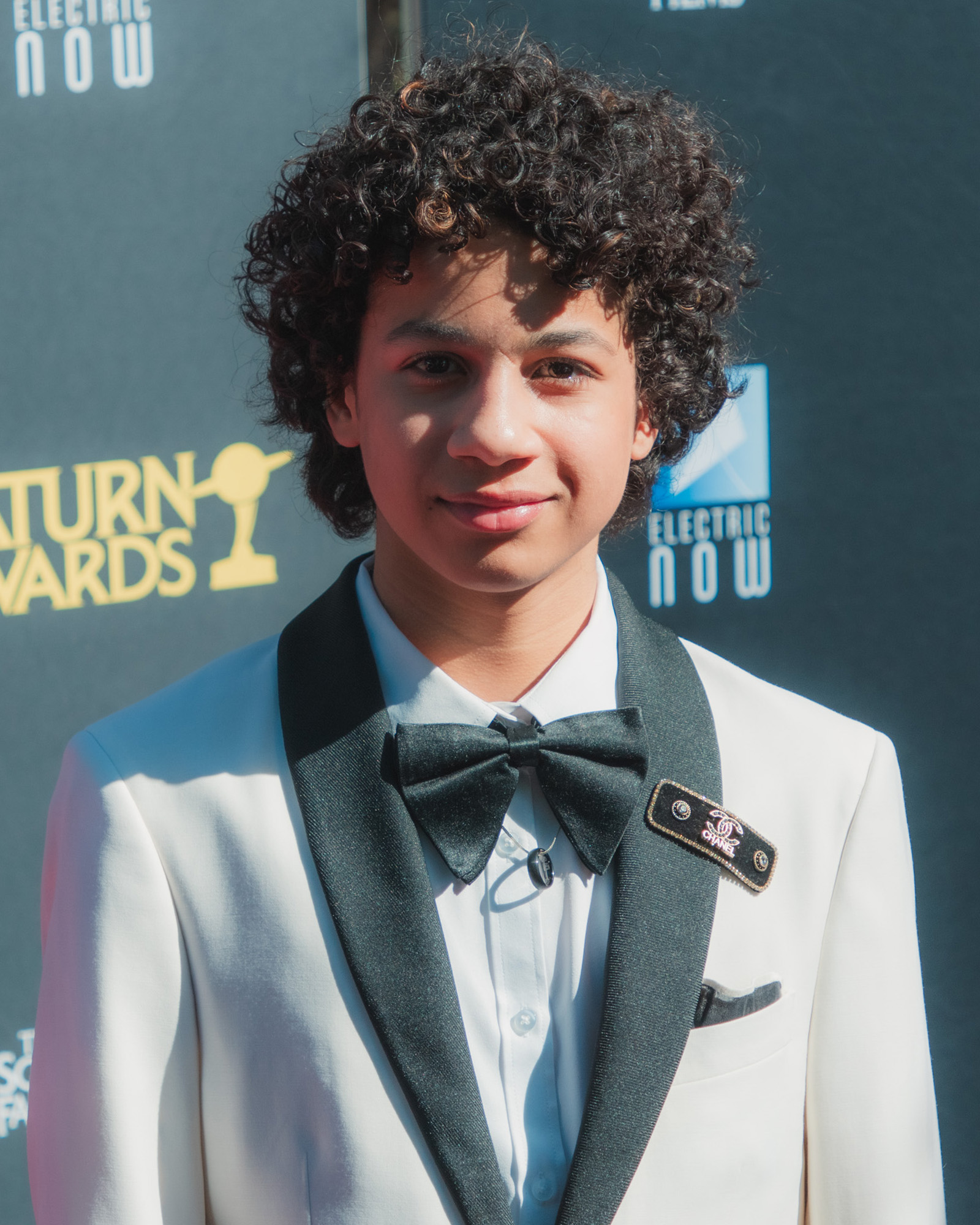
- Cabot-Conyers in 2026
- Occupation: Actor
- Years active: 2017–present

Ravi Cabot-Conyers is an American actor. He starred in the Lucasfilm Ltd. series Star Wars: Skeleton Crew (2024), as well as the thriller Grassland, alongside Mía Maestro, Quincy Isaiah, and Jeff Kober. Cabot-Conyers is set to lead Jon Favreau's upcoming Disney+ series, Oswald. He earned an Emmy Award nomination for his work in Skeleton Crew.

== Career ==
In addition to Star Wars: Skeleton Crew, Cabot-Conyers' television work includes playing son to on-screen parents Rashida Jones and Kenya Barris on Netflix's single-camera comedy series, #blackAF. Other notable small screen performances for Cabot-Conyers include a guest star turn on FOX's The Resident as Jasper Barnett, and a recurring role as Leo, on CBS All Access' Tell Me a Story.

In addition to Grassland, he has also starred alongside Glynn Turman in Stephanie Turner's Justine, which was acquired by Ava DuVernay's ARRAY, and aired on Netflix, and played grandson to acclaimed actor Bruce Dern in Tom Dolby's The Artist's Wife.

Cabot-Conyers' animated résumé includes voicing the character Antonio Madrigal in Walt Disney Animation Studios' 2021 multi-award-winning film, Encanto. He reprised this role 2 years later in Walt Disney Animation Studios' Oscar-nominated short Once Upon a Studio. He can be heard voicing characters on several television programs, among them Dee & Friends in Oz, Firebuds, and Get Rolling with Otis.

== Filmography ==
=== Film ===
Year	Title	Role	Ref.
2019	Justine	Drew	
2019	Ode to Joy	Deangelo	
2019	The Artist's Wife	Gogo	
2021	Encanto	Antonio Madrigal (voice)	
2023	Once Upon a Studio	Antonio Madrigal (voice)	
2024	Grassland	Leo	

=== Television ===
Year	Title	Role	Notes	Ref.
2017	HGTV: House Hunters Family	Andrew	TV short	
2018	The Resident	Jasper Barnett	Episode: "The Germ"	
2018	Tell Me a Story	Leo	2 episodes	
2020	#BlackAF	Kam	Recurring role	
2022	Get Rolling with Otis	Squiggy (voice)	Episode: "The Sneaky Snacker"	
2023	Firebuds	McCarly Carkin (voice)	Episode: "Mayhem at the Museum"	
2024	Dee & Friends in Oz	Lil Larry, Baby Woo-hoo	Episode: "Dee and the Shrink Bug"	
2024–2025	Star Wars: Skeleton Crew	Wim	Main role	
2027	Oswald	Jake	Main role; Post-production	

== Awards and nominations ==
Year	Organisation	Category	Project	Result	Ref.
2025	Children's and Family Emmy Awards	Outstanding Younger Performer in a Preschool, Children's or Young Teen Program	Star Wars: Skeleton Crew	Nominated	
2026	Saturn Award	Best Young Performer in a Television Series	Star Wars: Skeleton Crew	Won	
