= Oswald (2027 TV series) =

- Genre: Comedy
- Created by: Jon Favreau
- Based on: Oswald the Lucky Rabbit by: Walt Disney; Ub Iwerks
- Written by: Jon Favreau
- Starring: Ravi Cabot-Conyers; Ryder Allen; Mykal-Michelle Harris; Amy Sedaris; Kathryn Hahn; Al Madrigal; Steve Martin
- Music by: John Debney
- Country of origin: United States
- Original language: English

Production
- Executive producers: Jon Favreau; Andrew R. Jones; Karen Gilchrist; John Bartnicki
- Production companies: Walt Disney Studios; Fairview Entertainment

Original release
- Network: Disney+

Oswald is an upcoming American live-action animated comedy television miniseries created by Jon Favreau for the streaming service Disney+, based on the character of the same name.

Development on the series began in March 2025 and had been a priority since Disney acquired the trademark in 2006. Filming began in late July and wrapped in early October, in California.

Oswald will be released on February 17, 2027 on Disney+, marking the centennial of the character’s 1927 debut.

== Synopsis ==
After having been locked away for years, Oswald the Lucky Rabbit finds himself released by an earthquake and attempts to adapt to the modern world with the help of a group of kids.

== Cast and characters ==
- Ravi Cabot-Conyers as Jake, a hardworking middle school student with a big heart.
- Ryder Allen as Taylor, a middle school student who is cautious but avoids turning down his friends.
- Mykal-Michelle Harris as Jen, an artistic middle schooler who is always ahead of the game.
- Amy Sedaris as Taylor's mother
- Kathryn Hahn
- Al Madrigal
- Steve Martin
- Bernell Pesino

== Episodes ==
No.	Title	Directed by	Written by	Original release date	U.S. viewers (millions)
1	TBA	TBA	Jon Favreau	February 17, 2027	TBD
2	TBA	TBA	Jon Favreau	February 17, 2027	TBD
3	TBA	TBA	Jon Favreau	February 17, 2027	TBD

== Production ==
=== Background ===
A series centered on Oswald was in development, with the project announced in 2019 for a potential release on Disney+. Disney Television Animation veteran Matt Danner revealed that a series was in development as a follow up for the team behind Legend of the Three Caballeros, but that they "got broken up and scattered to the wind". He expressed hope that the series could still be revived in the future and further hinted that another team would develop it, as Disney was still heavily invested in wanting to revive the character.

In March 2025, The Walt Disney Studios was revealed to be developing a live-action/animated series based on Oswald the Lucky Rabbit, for the streaming service Disney+. Jon Favreau served as the writer and executive producer; Favreau first had discussions with animation supervisor Andrew R. Jones while working on Disney's The Jungle Book (2016) about developing a project starring Oswald, having been fascinated by the character's rights history. In June 2025, Ravi Cabot-Conyers, Ryder Allen, and Mykal-Michelle Harris joined the cast. In July, Amy Sedaris joined the cast while Favreau was reported be serving as a director for the series. Al Madrigal and Steve Martin joined the cast in August, while Jude Weng and Jones were hired to direct episodes of the series.

In August 2026, the series' official title was announced as Oswald, being a three-part mini series.

=== Filming ===
Principal photography began on July 31, 2025, in California, with Kathryn Hahn joining the cast, and wrapped on October 7. Additional filming took place at Disneyland at the Partners statue and Main Street in March 2026.

=== Visual effects and animation ===
At the North American International Toy Fair 2026, Favreau confirmed that the series would utilize traditional animation. In April 2026, during an interview at Cinemacon 2026, Favreau confirmed that the series traditional animation is being handled by different animation studios working remotely across Los Angeles, Canada, and Spain. In May 2026 during the press tour of The Mandalorian and Grogu in Spain, Favreau confirmed that one of the animation studios was SPA Studios, with studio head and former Disney animator Sergio Pablos leading the animation team, which is composed of former and current Disney 2D animators.

=== Music ===
In August 2026, recurring Favreau collaborator John Debney was revealed to have composed the score for the series.

== Release ==
Oswald is slated for a February 2027 release on Disney+. This will coincide with the 100th anniversary of the character's debut in the short-film Trolley Troubles.
