= The Artist's Wife =

2019 American drama film

- Film poster
- Directed by: Tom Dolby
- Written by: Tom Dolby; Nicole Brending; Abdi Nazemian
- Produced by: Mike S. Ryan; Tom Dolby; Susanne Filkins; Abdi Nazemian
- Starring: Lena Olin; Bruce Dern; Juliet Rylance; Avan Jogia; Catherine Curtin; Tonya Pinkins; Stefanie Powers
- Cinematography: Ryan Earl Parker
- Edited by: Gena Bleier
- Music by: Jeff Grace
- Production companies: Water’s End Productions; Greyshack Films
- Distributed by: Strand Releasing
- Release dates: October 11, 2019 (Hamptons); September 25, 2020 (United States)
- Running time: 95 minutes
- Country: United States
- Language: English

The Artist's Wife is a 2019 American drama film directed by Tom Dolby. The film, shot in New York City and East Hampton, stars Lena Olin, Bruce Dern, Juliet Rylance, Avan Jogia, Catherine Curtin, Tonya Pinkins and Stefanie Powers. The film premiered at the 2019 Hamptons International Film Festival. It was scheduled to release in the United States on April 3, 2020, at the Angelika Film Center and Landmark Theaters in New York City, with additional engagements to follow, but was postponed to a streaming and virtual cinema release on September 25, 2020, due to the COVID-19 pandemic. It was released in the U.K. on April 30, 2021, and in Australia and New Zealand on May 20, 2021.

== Plot ==
The Artist's Wife centers on Claire (Lena Olin), the wife of famed artist Richard Smythson (Bruce Dern) and once a promising painter herself, who now lives in the shadow of her husband's illustrious career. While preparing work for a new exhibition, Richard is diagnosed with dementia. As Richard's memories and moods become lost and erratic, Claire attempts to shield his illness from the art community while trying to reconnect him with his estranged daughter (Juliet Rylance) and grandson (Ravi Cabot-Conyers). Claire, who has taken up painting once again, must decide whether to stand with her husband in the shadows or step into the spotlight herself.

== Cast ==
- Lena Olin as Claire Smythson
- Bruce Dern as Richard Smythson
- Juliet Rylance as Angela Smythson
- Avan Jogia as Danny
- Catherine Curtin as Joyce
- Tonya Pinkins as Liza Caldwell
- Stefanie Powers as Ada Risi
- Ravi Cabot-Conyers as Gogo
- Alexandre Bagot as Mikey

== Reception ==
On review aggregator Rotten Tomatoes, the film holds an approval rating of 63% based on 49 reviews, with an average rating of 6.2/10.

Mick LaSalle of the San Francisco Chronicle wrote, “The revelation here is Lena Olin, who gets her best role in years.” Joe Leydon wrote in Variety that “The Artist’s Wife stands apart from the pack.” He also noted that, “Olin subtly expresses an impressively diverse array of complex and often contradictory emotions” while "Dern sustains a firm grip on our sympathy,” and that scenes between them “crackle with intensity.”

Frank Scheck of The Hollywood Reporter wrote that the film was, “Terrific…a superbly nuanced performance in which [Olin] seems literally to glow brighter the longer she’s onscreen.” The film's portrayal of sexuality was also praised, with Scheck noting that, "the actress seizes this one with fervor, clearly relishing the film’s adult treatment of mature sexuality...The Artist's Wife displays rare sophistication for a non-European film, allowing its no-longer-young stars to demonstrate that physical passion doesn’t necessarily diminish with age.”

Some critics decried similarities to the 2017 film The Wife, with Scheck noting, “Despite its value in providing superb starring turns by Lena Olin and Bruce Dern, the film never manages to overcome its air of familiarity.”

Olin and Dern received critical acclaim for their performances. Variety placed Olin and Dern on its inaugural lists of the publication's top 40 candidates for Best Actress and Best Actor nominations for the 2021 Academy Awards.

== Film festivals ==
- Hamptons International Film Festival
  - (Next Exposure Grant Winner)
- Palm Springs International Film Festival
- Mill Valley Film Festival
- Sonoma International Film Festival
  - (Best US Independent Feature)
- Whistler Film Festival
- Sarasota Film Festival
- Gold Coast International Film Festival
  - (Audience Award for Best Narrative Feature)
