= The Institute (TV series) =

American television series

- Genre: Horror
- Based on: The Institute by Stephen King
- Developed by: Benjamin Cavell
- Starring: Ben Barnes; Joe Freeman; Simone Miller; Fionn Laird; Hannah Galway; Julian Richings; Robert Joy; Martin Roach; Mary-Louise Parker; Arlen So; Alfie Allen
- Country of origin: United States
- Original language: English
- No. of seasons: 2
- No. of episodes: 11

Production
- Executive producers: Jack Bender; Benjamin Cavell; Gary Barber; Sam Sheridan; Shane Elrod; Ed Redlich; Stephen King
- Running time: 54–59 minutes
- Production companies: Spyglass Media Group; Sashajo Productions; Nomadicfilm; MGM+ Studios

Original release
- Network: MGM+
- Release: July 13, 2025 – present

The Institute is an American supernatural horror television series written by Benjamin Cavell and directed by Jack Bender, with both also serving as executive producers. Based on the novel of the same name by Stephen King, the series stars Ben Barnes, Mary-Louise Parker, and Joe Freeman in the main roles, and follows a young teenager who wakes up in a place where children possess special abilities, only to discover the institute's dark secrets.

The series premiered on July 13, 2025, on MGM+, and consists of eight episodes. In August 2025, the series was renewed for a second season which premiered on November 8, 2026.

== Cast and characters ==
=== Main ===
- Ben Barnes as Tim Jamieson
- Joe Freeman as Luke Ellis
- Simone Miller as Kalisha
- Fionn Laird as Nick
- Hannah Galway as Wendy Gullickson
- Julian Richings as Stackhouse
- Robert Joy as Dr. Daniel Hendricks
- Martin Roach as Chief Ashworth (season 1)
- Mary-Louise Parker as Ms. Julia Sigsby
- Arlen So as George Iles (season 2; recurring season 1)
- Alfie Allen as Nolan Reeves (season 2)

=== Recurring ===
- Jason Diaz as Tony
- Brendan Beiser as Norbert Hollister
- Jordan Alexander as Kate
- Mary Walsh as Annie
- Viggo Hanvelt as Avery Dixon
- Dan Beirne as Drew
- Birva Pandya as Iris
- Jane Luk as Maureen Alvorson

== Episodes ==
Season	Episodes	Originally released	
Season	Episodes	First released	Last released
1	8	July 13, 2025	August 24, 2025
2	8	November 8, 2026	December 20, 2026

=== Season 1 (2025) ===
No. overall	No. in season	Title	Directed by	Teleplay by	Original release date
1	1	"The Boy"	Jack Bender	Benjamin Cavell	July 13, 2025
2	2	"Shots for Dots"	Jack Bender	Ed Redlich	July 13, 2025
3	3	"Graduation"	Brad Turner	Sam Sheridan	July 20, 2025
4	4	"The Box"	Brad Turner	Sophie Owens-Bender	July 27, 2025
5	5	"Back Half"	Jeff Renfroe	Eric Dickinson	August 3, 2025
6	6	"Run"	Jeff Renfroe	Benjamin Cavell & Ed Redlich & Sam Sheridan	August 10, 2025
7	7	"Hide"	Jack Bender	Sam Sheridan	August 17, 2025
8	8	"Fight"	Jack Bender	Benjamin Cavell & Sam Sheridan	August 24, 2025

=== Season 2 (2026) ===
No. overall	No. in season	Title	Directed by	Teleplay by	Original release date
9	1	"The Reckoning"	Jack Bender	Benjamin Cavell	November 8, 2026
10	2	"The Sanctuary"	Jack Bender	Sam Sheridan	November 15, 2026
11	3	"Double Cross"	Jeff Renfroe	Sophie Owens-Bender	November 22, 2026
12	4	"Truth and Consequences"	TBA	Ed Redlich & Leanne Koch	November 29, 2026
13	5	"The Scraper"	TBA	Eric Dickinson	December 6, 2026
14	6	"Hinge"	TBA	Sam Sheridan	December 13, 2026
15	7	"Break On Through"	TBA	Sam Sheridan	December 20, 2026
16	8	"The Other Side"	TBA	Benjamin Cavell	December 20, 2026

== Production ==
=== Development ===
When Stephen King's novel The Institute was released, David E. Kelley was linked with adapting it as a limited series in September 2019, with Jack Bender as director and Spyglass producing. In 2024, a new production was set up with Bender still attached, but now with Benjamin Cavell writing and executive producing at MGM+ Studios. In August 2025, MGM+ renewed the series for a second season.

=== Casting ===
In June 2024, Ben Barnes and Mary-Louise Parker were cast as Tim Jamieson and Ms Sigsby. Simone Miller and Jason Diaz joined the cast in the roles of Kalisha and Tony. Another casting announcement in September 2024 revealed eleven cast members in Joe Freeman, Fionn Laird, Hannah Galway, Julian Richings, Robert Joy, Viggo Hanvelt, Arlen So, Birva Pandya, Dan Beirne, Martin Roach, and Jane Luk. It was also revealed that characters had been aged up from their respective novel characters.

=== Filming ===
Filming for the first season took place in Halifax, Nova Scotia between August and November 2024. First look images from filming were released in December 2024.

Filming for the second season ended in early June 2026.

== Broadcast ==
The first episode was shown at SXSW on June 5, 2025. The first season premiered on MGM+ on July 13, 2025, with a two episode premiere.

The second season premiered on MGM+ on November 8, 2026.

== Reception ==
On the review aggregator website Rotten Tomatoes, the first season holds a 64% approval rating based on 25 critic reviews. The website's critics consensus reads, "A slick and schematic adaptation of Stephen King's novel, The Institute won't keep everyone committed but still offers up enough intrigue to merit a tour." Metacritic, which uses a weighted average, assigned a score of 52 out of 100 based on 16 critics, indicating "mixed or average" reviews.
