= Joe Freeman =

English actor (born 2006)

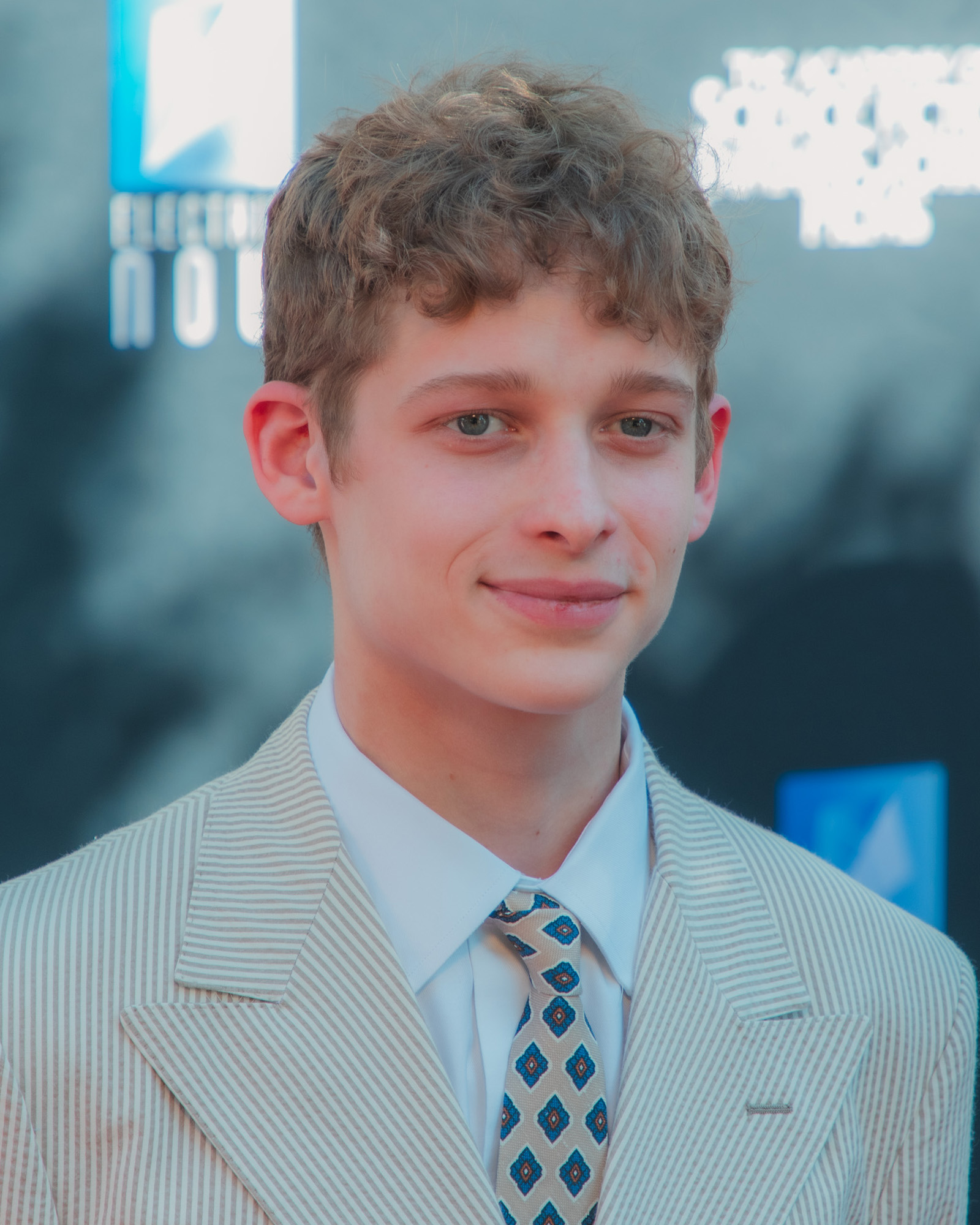
- Freeman in 2026
- Born: 30 November 2006 (age 19)
- Occupation: Actor
- Years active: 2023–present
- Television: The Institute
- Parents: Martin Freeman (father); Amanda Abbington (mother)

Joe Freeman (born 30 November 2006) is an English actor. He has a lead role in the MGM+ Stephen King television adaptation The Institute (2025).

== Career ==
Freeman began pursuing an acting career straight from finishing school. His stage performances included a production of Everybody's Talking About Jamie in England in 2023. Freeman made his television debut on long-running British television series Doctors in 2024.

In 2025, Freeman could be seen in his debut in a television leading role as 14 year-old gifted child Luke Ellis in MGM+ adaptation The Institute of the 2019 Stephen King novel of the same name alongside Ben Barnes and Mary Louise Parker. His performance "shoulders a lot of dramatic weight" in the series according to the Los Angeles Times, and was described as having good "range" displaying "charm, smarts, vulnerability, defiance" with the show making him a "breakout star" according to the Radio Times and Deadline Hollywood.

== Personal life ==
Freeman is from an acting family; his parents Amanda Abbington and Martin Freeman are both British actors. He has a younger sister, Grace.

== Filmography ==
Year	Title	Role	Notes
2024	Doctors	Ben Phillips	1 episode
2025	The Institute	Luke Ellis	Lead role
