= Jean-Michel Rossignol =

Canadian make-up artist

Jean-Michel Rossignol is a Canadian special effects makeup artist. He is most noted for his work on the 2020 film Blood Quantum, for which he was a winner alongside Erik Gosselin, Joan-Patricia Parris and Nancy Ferlatte of the Canadian Screen Award for Best Makeup at the 9th Canadian Screen Awards in 2021; however, due to different inclusion rules around special effects makeup, he was not a nominee for the Prix Iris for Best Makeup at the 23rd Quebec Cinema Awards despite that award also having been won by Gosselin, Parris and Ferlatte.
