= Bruno Gatien =

Canadian make-up artist

Bruno Gatien is a Canadian make-up artist from Quebec. He is most noted as a winner of the Genie Award for Best Makeup at the 29th Genie Awards in 2009 for Cruising Bar 2, and the Prix Iris for Best Makeup at the 24th Quebec Cinema Awards in 2022 for The Time Thief (L'arracheuse de temps).

== Awards ==
Award	Date of ceremony	Category	Film	Result	Ref.
Genie Awards	2009	Best Makeup	Cruising Bar 2 with Adrien Morot, Réjean Goderre, Marie-France Guy, Nathalie Trépanier	Won	
Canadian Screen Awards	2018	Best Makeup	All You Can Eat Buddha	Nominated	
Prix Iris	2010	Best Makeup	Martyrs with Sophie Lebeau, Mélanie Rodrigue	Nominated	
Prix Iris	2018	Best Makeup	All You Can Eat Buddha	Nominated	
Prix Iris	2020	Best Makeup	Mafia Inc. with Marlène Rouleau	Nominated	
Prix Iris	2022	Best Makeup	The Time Thief (L'arracheuse de temps)	Won	
Prix Iris	2023	Best Makeup	Confessions of a Hitman (Confessions) with Kathryn Casault	Nominated	
Prix Iris	2024	Best Makeup	We Are Zombies with Catherine Brunelle, Rémy Couture, Vicky Limkalan	Nominated	
