= Saindon =

Saindon is a surname. Notable people with the surname include:

- Eric Saindon, American visual effects supervisor
- Pat Saindon (born 1961), American football player
- Pierre Saindon, Canadian make-up artist and educator
- Zoël Saindon (1919–1998), Canadian politician
