= Confessions of a Hitman =

- French: Confessions
- Directed by: Luc Picard
- Written by: Sylvain Guy
- Based on: Gallant: confessions d’un tueur à gages by Éric Thibault and Félix Séguin
- Produced by: Christian Larouche
- Starring: Luc Picard
- Cinematography: François Dutil
- Edited by: Carmen-Mélanie Pépin
- Music by: Daniel Bélanger
- Production company: Christal Films
- Distributed by: Les Films Opale
- Release date: December 4, 2021 (Whistler)
- Running time: 109 minutes
- Country: Canada
- Language: French

Confessions of a Hitman (French: Confessions) is a Canadian crime drama film, directed by Luc Picard and released in 2021. Based on Gallant: confessions d’un tueur à gages, a 2015 non-fiction book written by Éric Thibault and Félix Séguin about Canadian contract killer Gerald Gallant, the film stars Picard as Gallant.

The film's cast also includes David La Haye, Sandrine Bisson, Éveline Gélinas, Dany Boudreault, Emmanuel Charest, Jean-François Boudreau, Bobby Beshro, Maxim Gaudette, Louise Portal, Raymond Cloutier and Catherine De Léan.

The film was shot in 2019, on a budget of $6.6 million.

The film premiered at the 2021 Whistler Film Festival, and was commercially released in March 2022.

== Awards ==
Award	Date of ceremony	Category	Recipient(s)	Result	Ref(s)
Whistler Film Festival	2021	Best Director, Borsos Competition	Luc Picard	Won	
Canadian Screen Awards	2022	Best Supporting Actor	David La Haye	Nominated	
Canadian Screen Awards	2022	Best Adapted Screenplay	Sylvain Guy	Nominated	
Canadian Screen Awards	2022	Best Hair	Denis Parent, Jean-Luc Lapierre	Nominated	
Prix Iris	December 10, 2023	Best Actor	Luc Picard	Nominated	
Prix Iris	December 10, 2023	Best Original Music	Daniel Bélanger	Nominated	
Prix Iris	December 10, 2023	Best Makeup	Kathryn Casault, Bruno Gatien	Nominated	
Prix Iris	December 10, 2023	Public Prize	Christian Larouche, Sébastien Létourneau, Luc Picard, Sylvain Guy	Nominated	
