= Traci Loader =

Canadian make-up artist

Traci Loader (born March 2, 1970, in Newmarket, Ontario) is a Canadian make-up artist, who won the Canadian Screen Award for Best Makeup at the 10th Canadian Screen Awards in 2022 for her work on the film Night Raiders.

She was previously nominated in the same category alongside François Dagenais at the 2nd Canadian Screen Awards in 2014 for Cottage Country, and alongside Dan Martin and Dorota Mitoraj at the 9th Canadian Screen Awards in 2021 for Possessor. Alongside Mitoraj, she was also nominated in the television makeup category at the 8th Canadian Screen Awards in 2020 for the television series Coroner.

At the 97th Academy Awards, she was nominated for an Academy Award in the category Best Makeup and Hairstyling for the film Nosferatu. Her nomination was shared with David White and Suzanne Stokes-Munton.
