= Noémi Poulin =

Canadian costume designer

Noémi Poulin is a Canadian costume designer.

She is most noted for her work on the film Blood Quantum, for which she won the Canadian Screen Award for Best Costume Design at the 9th Canadian Screen Awards, and was a Prix Iris nominee for Best Costume Design at the 23rd Quebec Cinema Awards.
