= Adriana Verbert =

Canadian make-up artist

Adriana Verbert is a Canadian make-up artist from Quebec. She is most noted as a two-time winner of the Prix Iris for Best Makeup, at the 22nd Quebec Cinema Awards in 2020 for The Twentieth Century, and at the 24th Quebec Cinema Awards in 2022 for The Time Thief (L'arracheuse de temps).

She was also nominated in the same category at the 25th Quebec Cinema Awards in 2023 for Babysitter.
