= 50th Anniversary Saturn Awards =

2022 science fiction/fantasy/horror awards ceremony

- Date: October 25, 2022
- Site: Los Angeles Marriott Burbank Airport Hotel, Burbank, California
- Hosted by: Joel McHale

Highlights
- Most awards: Film: Everything Everywhere All at Once (3); Nightmare Alley (3); Top Gun: Maverick (3); Television (Network / Cable): Better Call Saul (4); Television (Streaming): Obi-Wan Kenobi (3)
- Most nominations: Film: The Batman (12); Television (Network / Cable): Better Call Saul (7); Television (Streaming): Severance (6); Stranger Things (6)

The 50th Anniversary Saturn Awards, presented by the Academy of Science Fiction, Fantasy and Horror Films and honoring the best in science fiction, fantasy, horror, and other genres belonging to genre fiction in film, television, and home entertainment, were held on October 25, 2022, at Los Angeles Marriott Burbank Airport Hotel in Burbank, California, and live-streamed on Electric Entertainment's OTT app and FAST channel ElectricNow. The nominations were announced on August 12, 2022. Actor and comedian Joel McHale hosted the event.

The 50th Saturn awards were preceded by the 46th Saturn Awards, held in 2021. The decision to rebrand what would have been the "47th Saturn Awards" to the "50th Saturn Awards", was made in order to celebrate 50 years of the Saturn Awards, which were founded in 1973.

This year, several new television categories were introduced. For the first time since the 45th Saturn Awards, the television awards were split into "Network / Cable" and "Streaming" categories; however, this was discontinued the following ceremony. Disney+ received the most nominations with 26 for "Streaming", followed by Netflix with 17; AMC dominated the nominations for "Network / Cable" with 17.

The Batman led the nominations for film with twelve, including Best Superhero Film and four acting nominations, followed by Nightmare Alley with ten and Spider-Man: No Way Home with nine. For television, Better Call Saul (AMC) led the nominations for "Network / Cable" with seven, followed by Superman & Lois (The CW) and The Walking Dead (AMC) with six each. Severance (Apple TV+) and Stranger Things (Netflix) led the nominations for the "Streaming" television categories with six each, followed by Obi-Wan Kenobi (Disney+) with five mentions.

== Category changes ==
Introduced

- Best Guest-Starring Performance in a Streaming Television Series
- Best Performance by a Younger Actor in a Streaming Television Series
- Best Guest-Starring Performance in a Network or Cable Television Series
- Best Performance by a Younger Actor in a Network or Cable Television Series

Revived

- Best Actor in a Streaming Television Series
- Best Actress in a Streaming Television Series
- Best Streaming Horror / Thriller Television Series
- Best Supporting Actor in a Streaming Television Series
- Best Supporting Actress in a Streaming Television Series

Discontinued

- Best Superhero Television Series
- Best Guest Starring Role on Television
- Best Performance by a Younger Actor in a Television Series

== Winners and nominees ==
=== Film ===
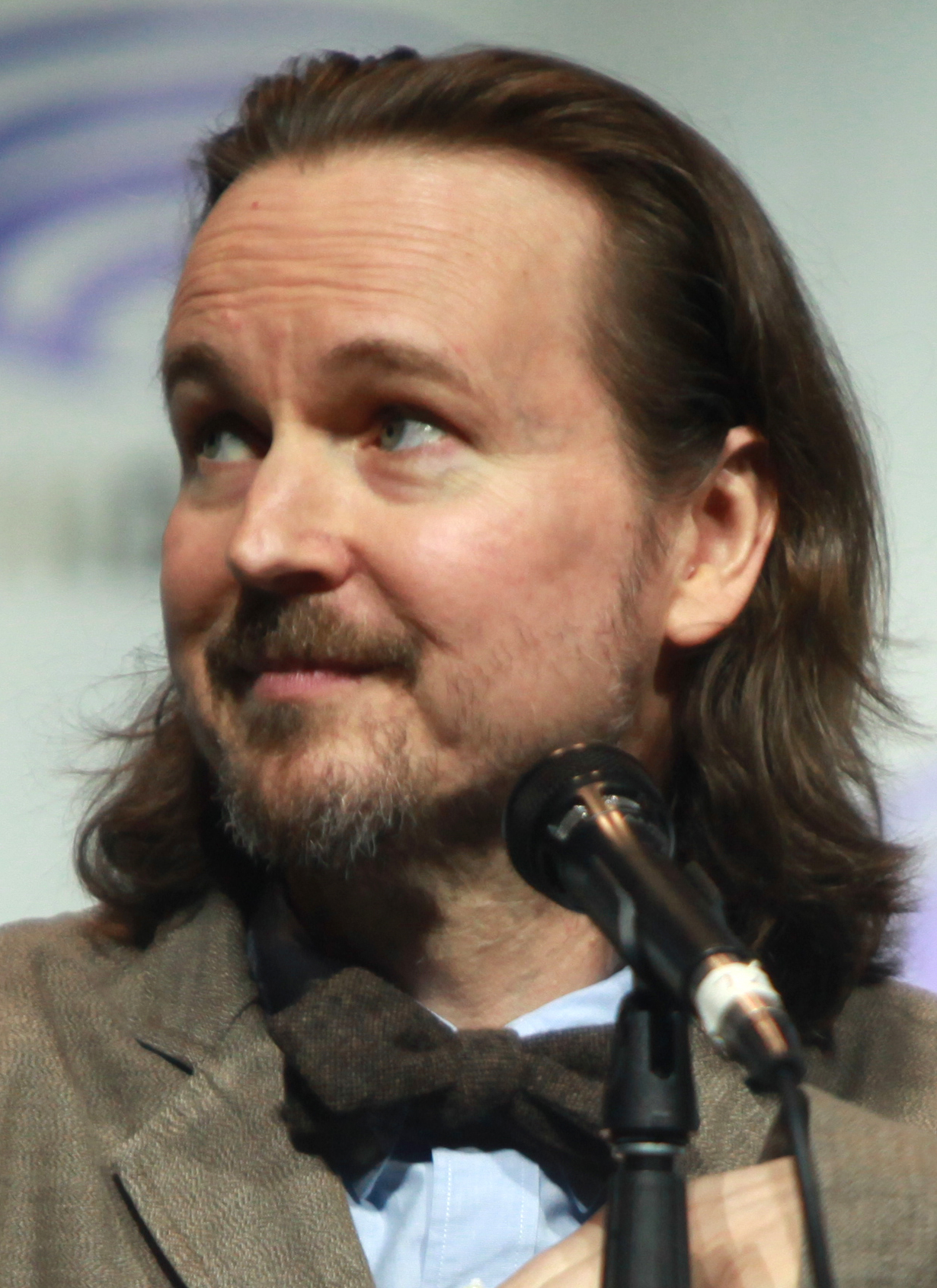
Matt Reeves, Best Film Direction winner

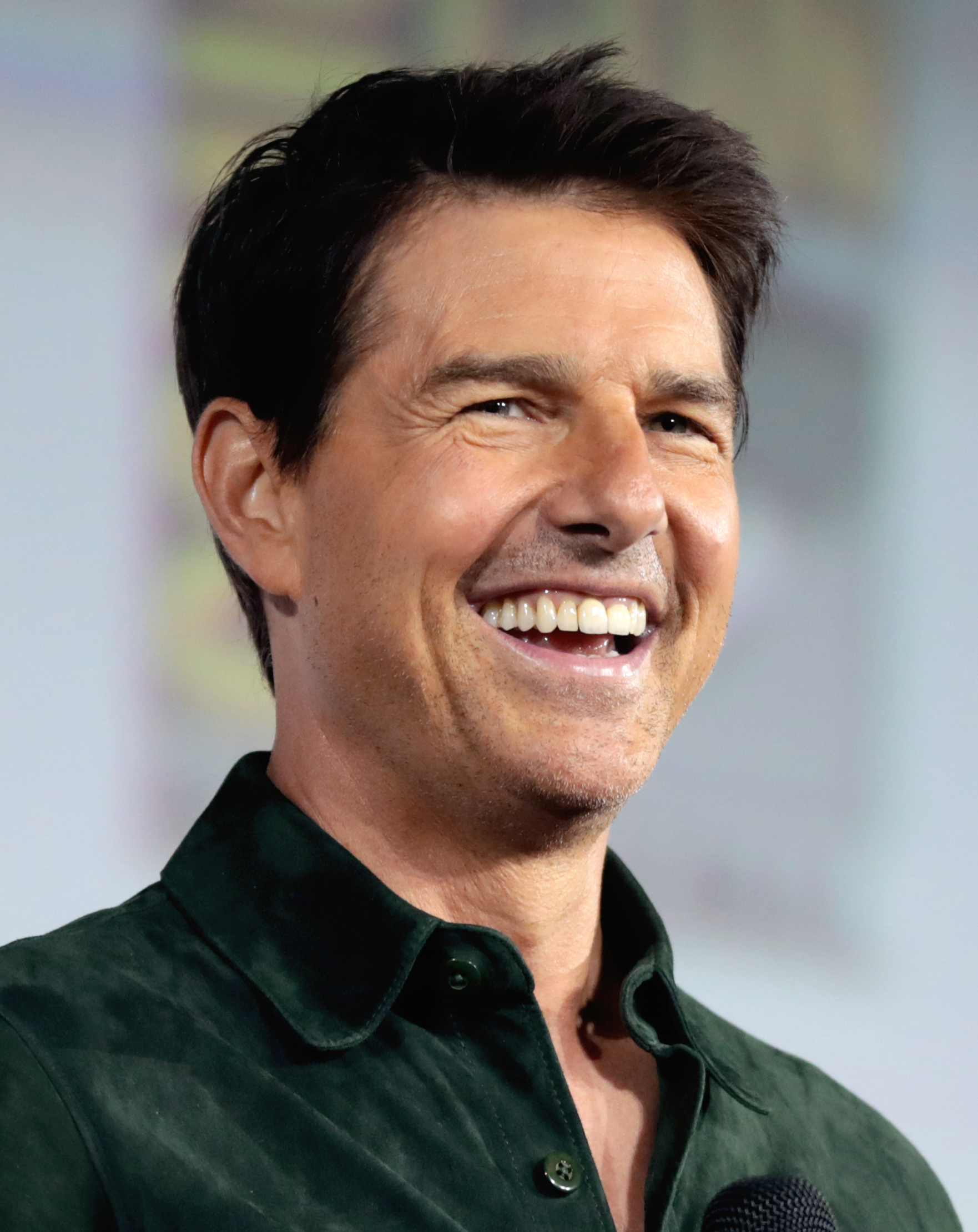
Tom Cruise, Best Actor in a Film winner

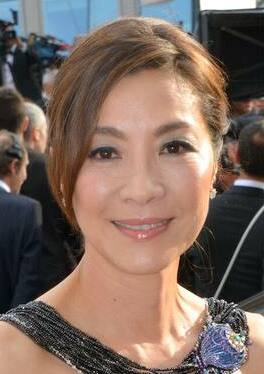
Michelle Yeoh, Best Actress in a Film winner

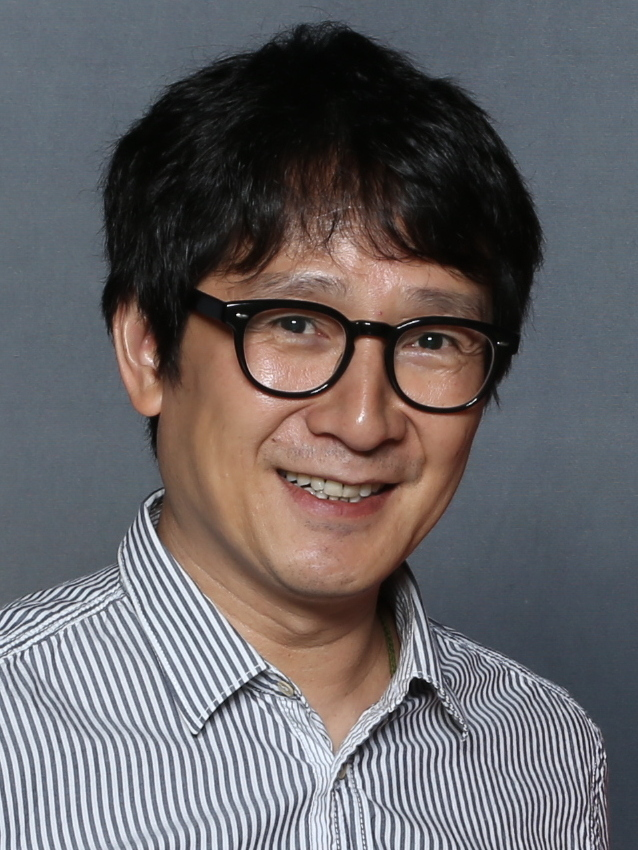
Ke Huy Quan, Best Supporting Actor in a Film winner

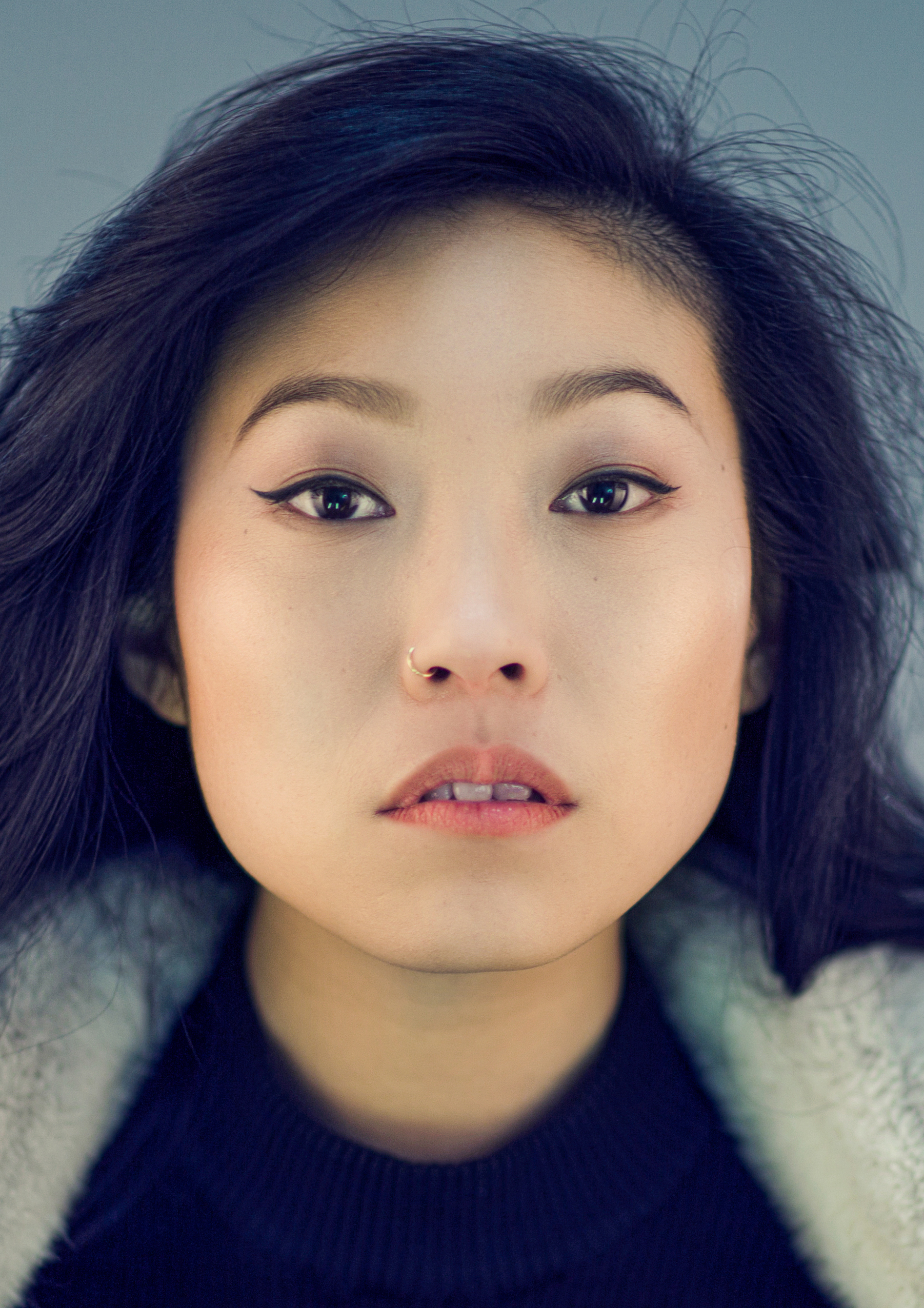
Awkwafina, Best Supporting Actress in a Film winner

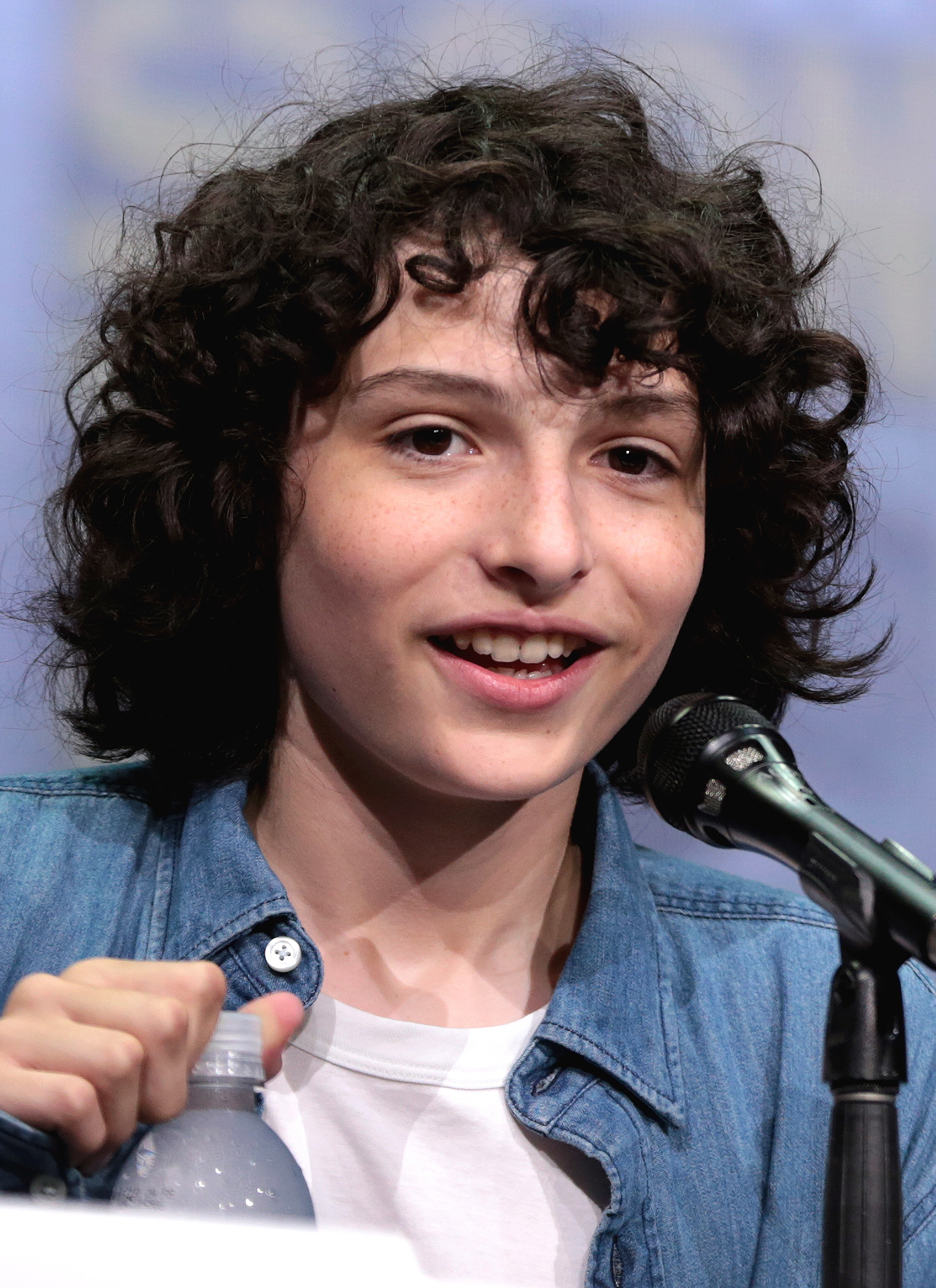
Finn Wolfhard, Best Younger Actor in a Film winner

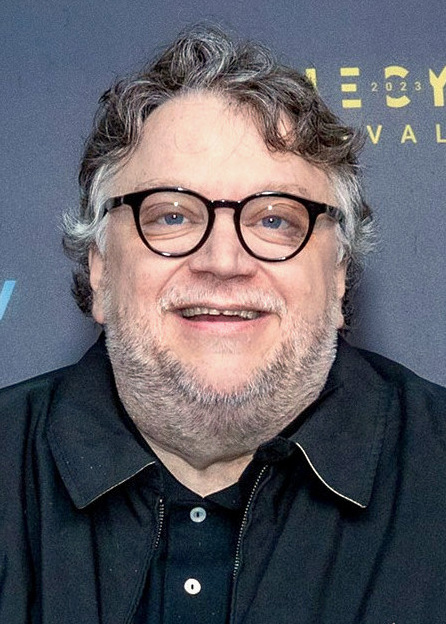
Guillermo del Toro, Best Film Writing co-winner

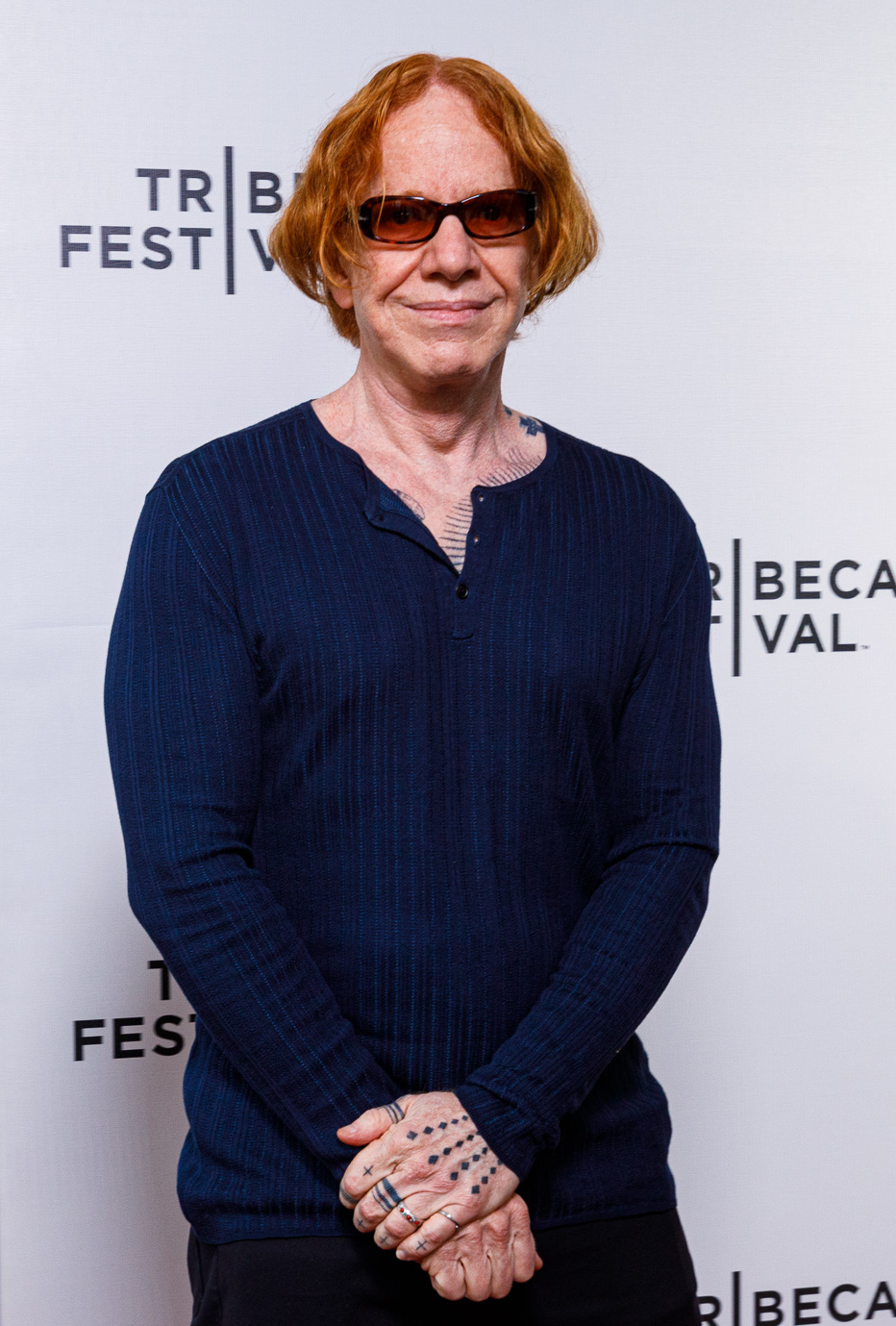
Danny Elfman, Best Music in a Film winner

Best Superhero Film	Best Science Fiction Film
Spider-Man: No Way Home; The Batman; Doctor Strange in the Multiverse of Madness; Shang-Chi and the Legend of the Ten Rings; The Suicide Squad; Thor: Love and Thunder	Nope; Crimes of the Future; Dune; Free Guy; Godzilla vs. Kong; Jurassic World Dominion
Best Fantasy Film	Best Horror Film
Everything Everywhere All at Once; Cruella; Fantastic Beasts: The Secrets of Dumbledore; Ghostbusters: Afterlife; The Green Knight; The Unbearable Weight of Massive Talent	The Black Phone; Last Night in Soho; The Night House; A Quiet Place Part II; Scream; X
Best Action / Adventure Film	Best Thriller Film
Top Gun: Maverick; Death on the Nile; F9; No Time to Die; RRR; West Side Story	Nightmare Alley; Ambulance; The Northman; Old; The Outfit; Pig
Best Animated Film	Best International Film
Marcel the Shell with Shoes On; The Addams Family 2; Encanto; Lightyear; Luca; Minions: The Rise of Gru	RRR; Downton Abbey: A New Era; Eiffel; I'm Your Man; Riders of Justice; Silent Night
Best Film Direction	Best Film Writing
Matt Reeves – The Batman; Guillermo del Toro – Nightmare Alley; Joseph Kosinski – Top Gun: Maverick; Jordan Peele – Nope; S. S. Rajamouli – RRR; Steven Spielberg – West Side Story; Jon Watts – Spider-Man: No Way Home	Guillermo del Toro and Kim Morgan – Nightmare Alley; Scott Derrickson and C. Robert Cargill – The Black Phone; Daniel Kwan and Daniel Scheinert – Everything Everywhere All at Once; Chris McKenna and Erik Sommers – Spider-Man: No Way Home; Jordan Peele – Nope; Matt Reeves and Peter Craig – The Batman; James Vanderbilt and Guy Busick – Scream
Best Actor in a Film	Best Actress in a Film
Tom Cruise – Top Gun: Maverick as Captain Pete "Maverick" Mitchell; Timothée Chalamet – Dune as Paul Atreides; Idris Elba – The Suicide Squad as Robert DuBois / Bloodsport; Tom Holland – Spider-Man: No Way Home as Peter Parker / Spider-Man; Daniel Kaluuya – Nope as Otis "OJ" Haywood Jr.; Simu Liu – Shang-Chi and the Legend of the Ten Rings as Shaun / Shang-Chi; Robert Pattinson – The Batman as Bruce Wayne / Batman	Michelle Yeoh – Everything Everywhere All at Once as Evelyn Wang; Cate Blanchett – Nightmare Alley as Dr. Lilith Ritter; Emily Blunt – A Quiet Place Part II as Evelyn Abbott; Zoë Kravitz – The Batman as Selina Kyle / Catwoman; Keke Palmer – Nope as Emerald "Em" Haywood; Emma Stone – Cruella as Estella / Cruella; Zendaya – Spider-Man: No Way Home as MJ
Best Supporting Actor in a Film	Best Supporting Actress in a Film
Ke Huy Quan – Everything Everywhere All at Once as Waymond Wang; Paul Dano – The Batman as Edward Nashton / The Riddler; Colin Farrell – The Batman as Oswald "Oz" Cobblepot / The Penguin; Ethan Hawke – The Black Phone as The Grabber; Richard Jenkins – Nightmare Alley as Ezra Grindle; Alfred Molina – Spider-Man: No Way Home as Dr. Otto Octavius / Doc Ock; Benedict Wong – Doctor Strange in the Multiverse of Madness as Wong	Awkwafina – Shang-Chi and the Legend of the Ten Rings as Katy; Carrie Coon – Ghostbusters: Afterlife as Callie Spengler; Jodie Comer – Free Guy as Millie Rusk; Viola Davis – The Suicide Squad as Amanda Waller; Stephanie Hsu – Everything Everywhere All at Once as Joy Wang / Jobu Tupaki; Diana Rigg – Last Night in Soho as Ms Collins (posthumous); Marisa Tomei – Spider-Man: No Way Home as May Parker
Best Younger Actor in a Film	Best Film Editing
Finn Wolfhard – Ghostbusters: Afterlife as Trevor Spengler; Noah Jupe – A Quiet Place Part II as Marcus Abbott; Madeleine McGraw – The Black Phone as Gwendolyn "Gwen" Blake; Millicent Simmonds – A Quiet Place Part II as Regan Abbott; Mason Thames – The Black Phone as Finney Blake; Jacob Tremblay – Luca as Luca Paguro	Eddie Hamilton – Top Gun: Maverick; Jeffrey Ford and Leigh Folsom Boyd – Spider-Man: No Way Home; William Hoy and Tyler Nelson – The Batman; Cam McLauchlin – Nightmare Alley; Nicholas Monsour – Nope; Paul Rogers – Everything Everywhere All at Once; Pietro Scalia, Doug Brandt, and Calvin Wimmer – Ambulance
Best Music in a Film	Best Film Production Designer
Danny Elfman – Doctor Strange in the Multiverse of Madness; Michael Abels – Nope; Nicholas Britell – Cruella; Michael Giacchino – The Batman; Nathan Johnson – Nightmare Alley; Howard Shore – Crimes of the Future; Joel P. West – Shang-Chi and the Legend of the Ten Rings	Tamara Deverell – Nightmare Alley; Sue Chan – Shang-Chi and the Legend of the Ten Rings; James Chinlund – The Batman; Fiona Crombie – Cruella; Jason Kisvarday – Everything Everywhere All at Once; Marcus Rowland – Last Night in Soho; Patrice Vermette – Dune
Best Film Costume Design	Best Make-Up in a Film
Jacqueline Durran, David Crossman, and Glyn Dillon – The Batman; Kym Barrett – Shang-Chi and the Legend of the Ten Rings; Jenny Beavan – Cruella; Bob Morgan and Jacqueline West – Dune; Mayes C. Rubeo – Thor: Love and Thunder; Luis Sequeira – Nightmare Alley; Sammy Sheldon – Eternals	Love Larson, Donald Mowat, and Eva von Bahr – Dune; Ozzy Alvarez, Victoria Down, Kevin Kirkpatrick, and Justin Raleigh – Army of the Dead; Alexandra Anger, Monica Pavez, and Evi Zafiropoulou – Crimes of the Future; Naomi Donne and Mike Marino – The Batman; Greg Funk, Brian Sipe, and Heba Thorisdottir – The Suicide Squad; Mike Hill, Jo-Ann MacNeil, and Megan Many – Nightmare Alley; Adam Johansen and Matteo Silvi – Thor: Love and Thunder
Best Film Special / Visual Effects	Best Independent Film
John "D.J." Des Jardin, Bryan Hirota, Kevin Andrew Smith, and Mike Meinardus – Godzilla vs. Kong; Jorundur Rafn Arnarson, Joe Letteri, and Erik Winquist – Doctor Strange in the Multiverse of Madness; Sheena Duggal and Alessandro Ongaro – Ghostbusters: Afterlife; Scott Edelstein, Kelly Port, Dan Sudick, and Chris Waegner – Spider-Man: No Way Home; Joe Farrell, Dan Oliver, Christopher Townsend, and Sean Noel Walker – Shang-Chi and the Legend of the Ten Rings; Scott R. Fisher and Ryan Tudhope – Top Gun: Maverick; David Vickery – Jurassic World Dominion	Dual; Alice; Dream Horse; Gold; Mass; Watcher

=== Television ===
==== Programs ====
Network / Cable
Best Science Fiction Television Series	Best Fantasy Television Series
Superman & Lois (The CW); The Flash (The CW); The Man Who Fell to Earth (Showtime); Resident Alien (Syfy); Supergirl (The CW); Westworld (HBO)	Shining Vale (Starz); Doctor Who (BBC America); Ghosts (CBS); La Brea (NBC); Riverdale (The CW); Stargirl (The CW)
Best Horror Television Series	Best Action / Thriller Television Series
The Walking Dead (AMC); American Horror Story: Double Feature (FX); Chucky (Syfy); Fear the Walking Dead (AMC); From (Epix); What We Do in the Shadows (FX)	Better Call Saul (AMC); Big Sky (ABC); The Blacklist (NBC); Dark Winds (AMC); Dexter: New Blood (Showtime); Outlander (Starz); Yellowjackets (Showtime)
Streaming
Best Science Fiction Television Series	Best Fantasy Television Series
Star Trek: Strange New Worlds (Paramount+); The Expanse (Prime Video); For All Mankind (Apple TV+); Lost in Space (Netflix); The Mandalorian (Disney+); The Orville: New Horizons (Hulu); Star Trek: Discovery (Paramount+)	Loki (Disney+); Russian Doll (Netflix); Schmigadoon! (Apple TV+); WandaVision (Disney+); The Wheel of Time (Prime Video); The Witcher (Netflix)
Best Horror / Thriller Television Series	Best Action / Adventure Television Series
Stranger Things (Netflix); Creepshow (Shudder); Evil (Paramount+); Servant (Apple TV+); Severance (Apple TV+); Squid Game (Netflix)	The Boys (Prime Video); Bosch: Legacy (FreeVee); Cobra Kai (Netflix); Leverage: Redemption (Freevee); Peacemaker (HBO Max); Reacher (Prime Video); The Umbrella Academy (Netflix)
Best Limited Event Television Series	Best Animated Television Series
Obi-Wan Kenobi (Disney+); The Book of Boba Fett (Disney+); Hawkeye (Disney+); Midnight Mass (Netflix); Moon Knight (Disney+); Ms. Marvel (Disney+)	Star Wars: The Bad Batch (Disney+); Arcane (Netflix); Blade Runner: Black Lotus (Crunchyroll / Adult Swim); The Boys: Diabolical (Prime Video); Invincible (Prime Video); Star Trek: Lower Decks (Paramount+); What If...? (Disney+)

==== Acting ====
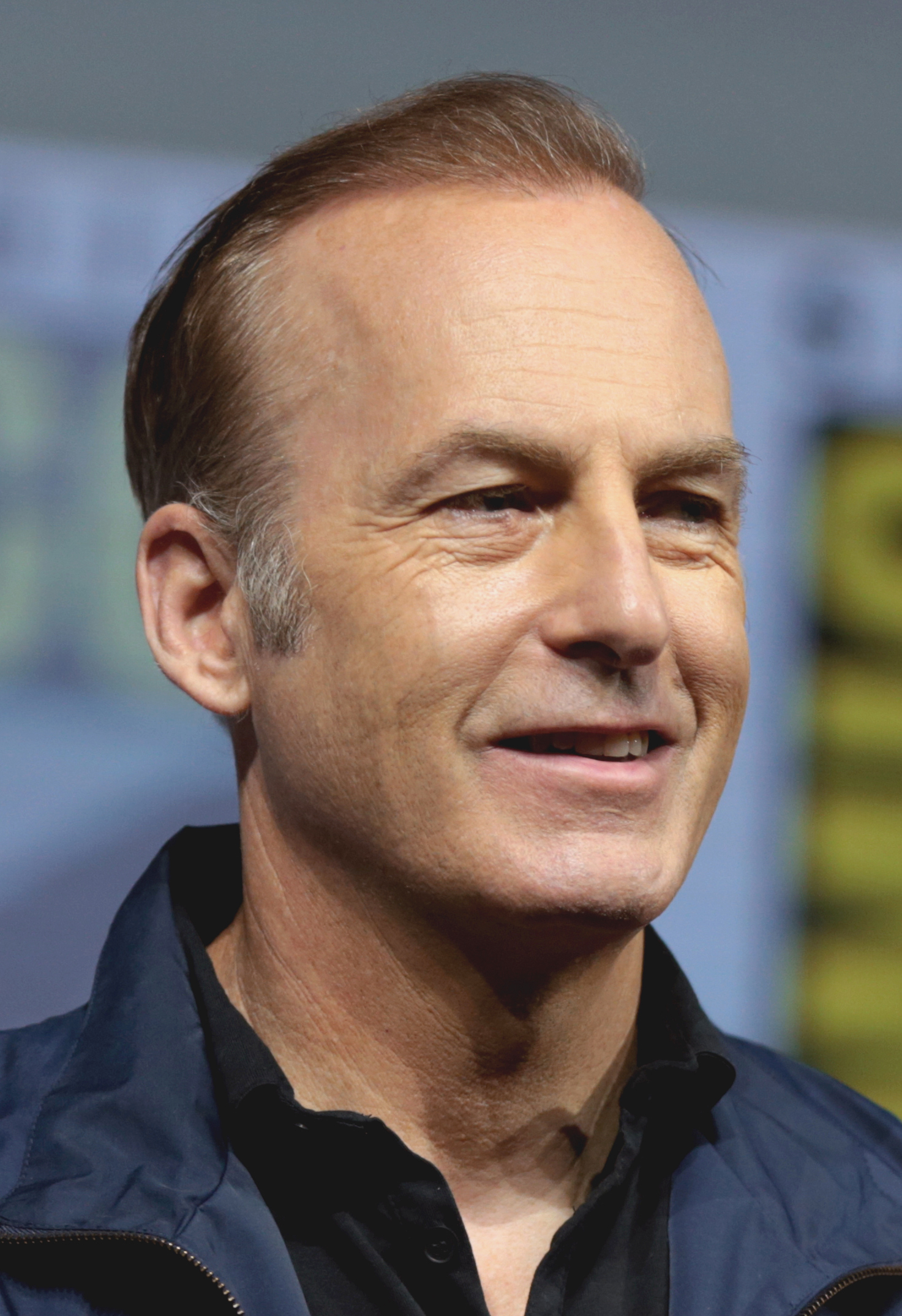
Bob Odenkirk, Best Actor in a Network / Cable Series winner

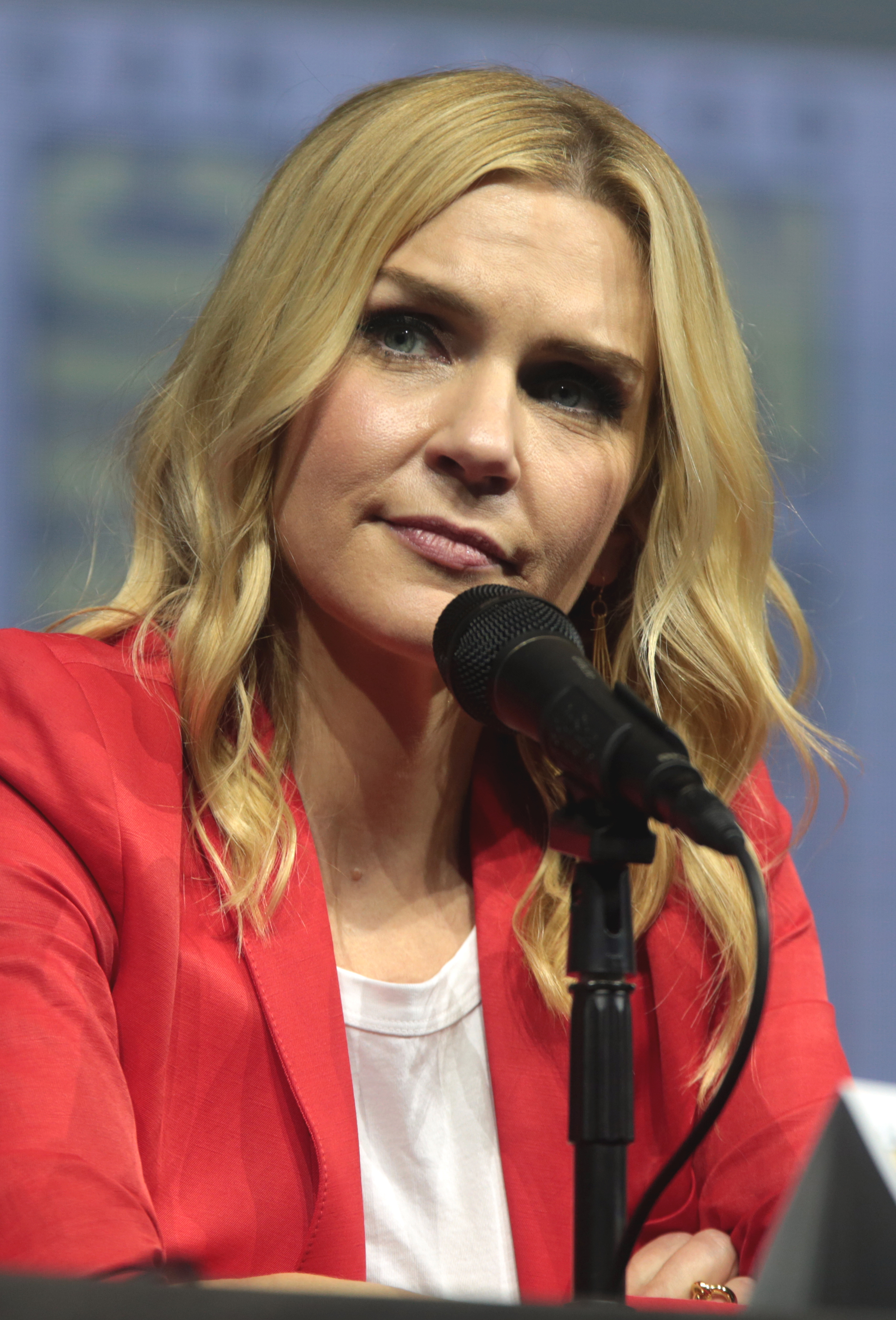
Rhea Seehorn, Best Actress in a Network / Cable Series winner

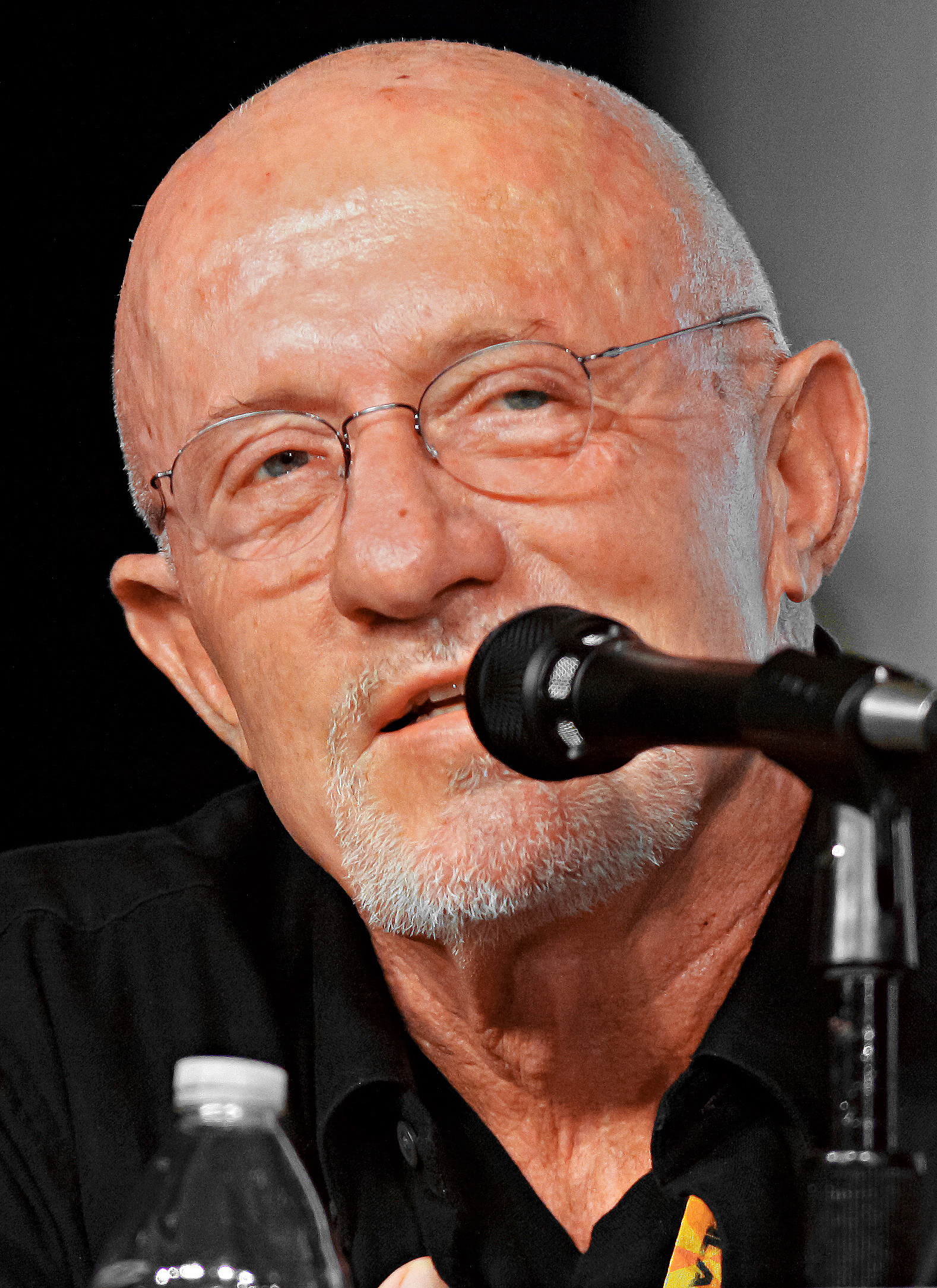
Jonathan Banks, Best Supporting Actor in a Network / Cable Series winner

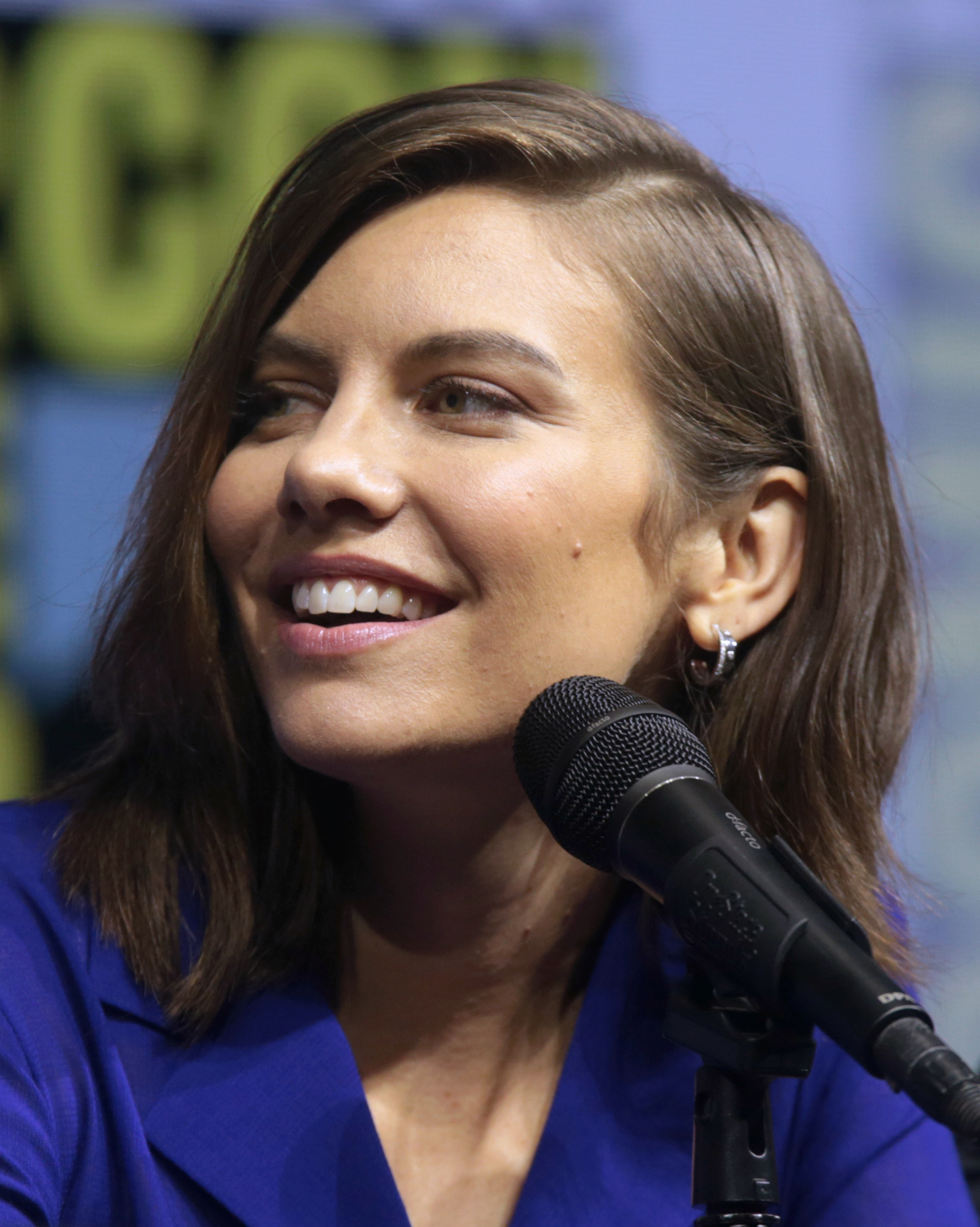
Lauren Cohan, Best Supporting Actress in a Network / Cable Series winner

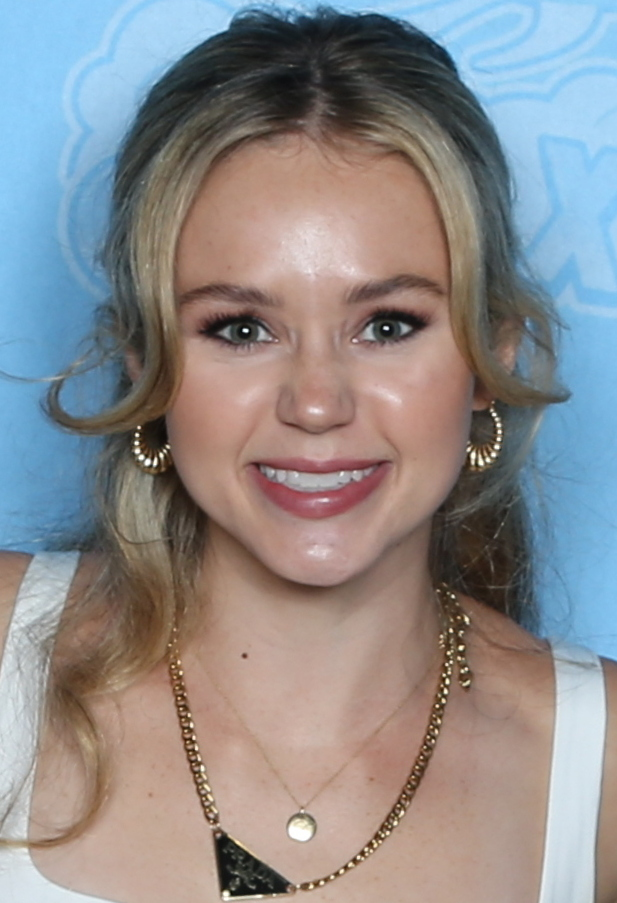
Brec Bassinger, Best Performance by a Younger Actor in a Network / Cable Series winner

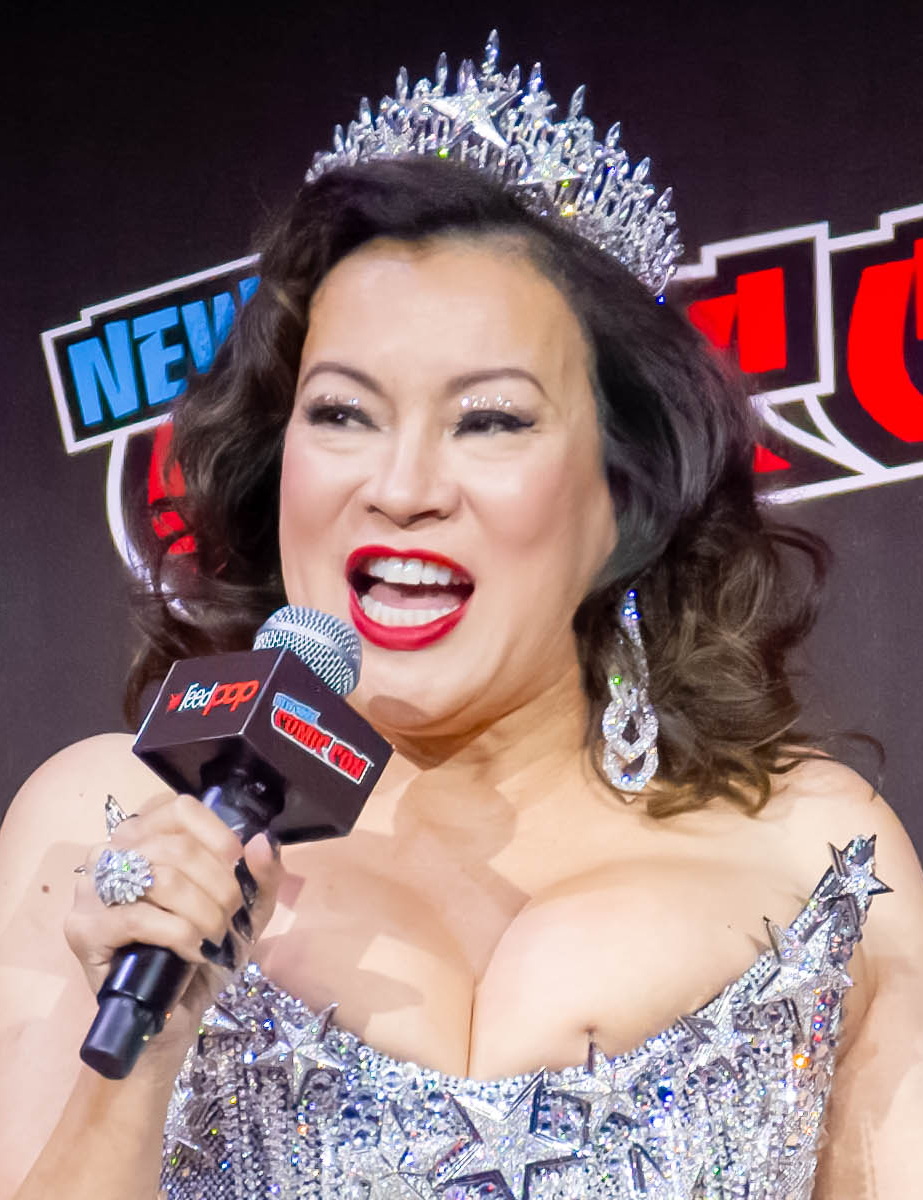
Jennifer Tilly, Best Guest-Starring Performance in a Network / Cable Series winner

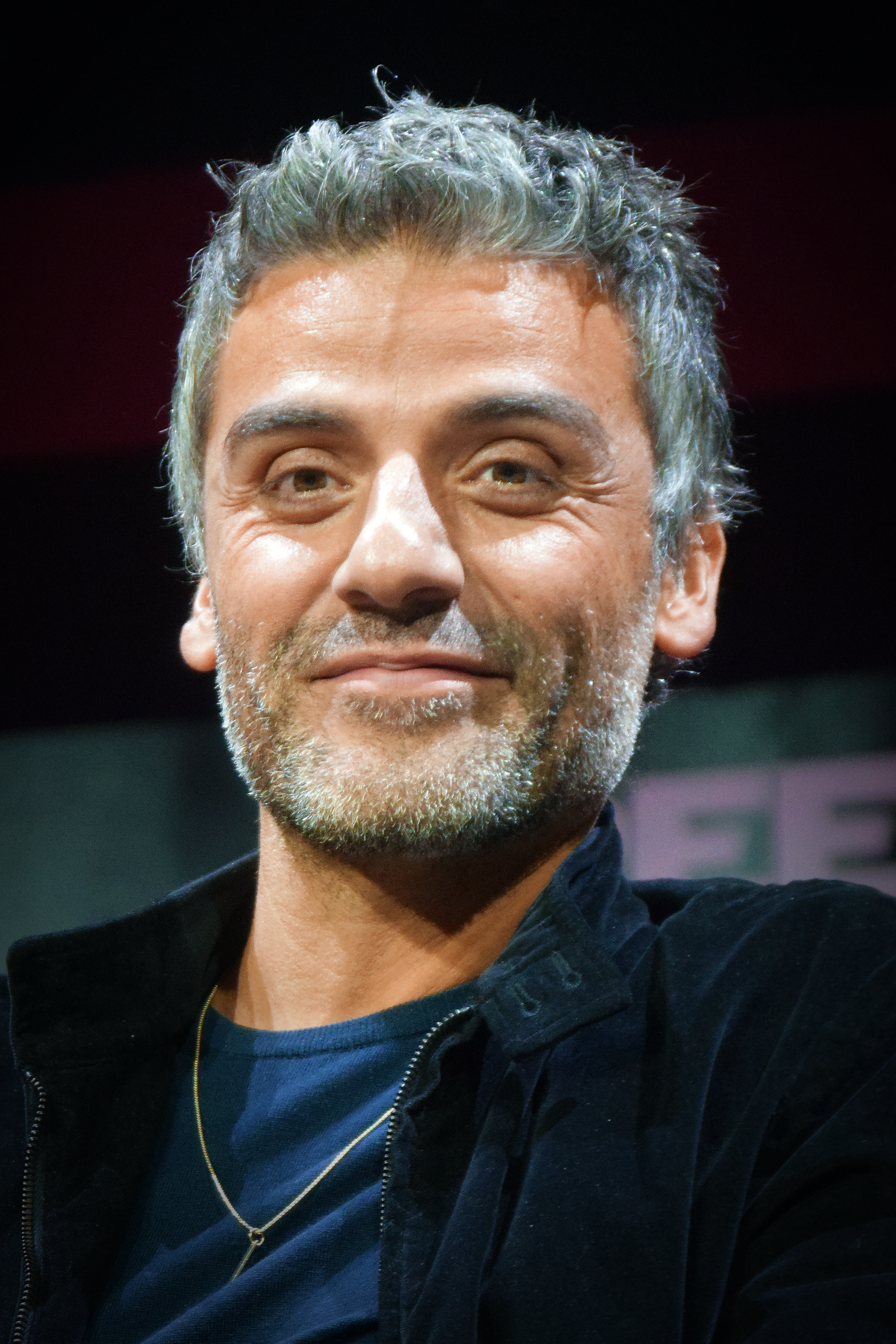
Oscar Isaac, Best Actor in a Streaming Series winner

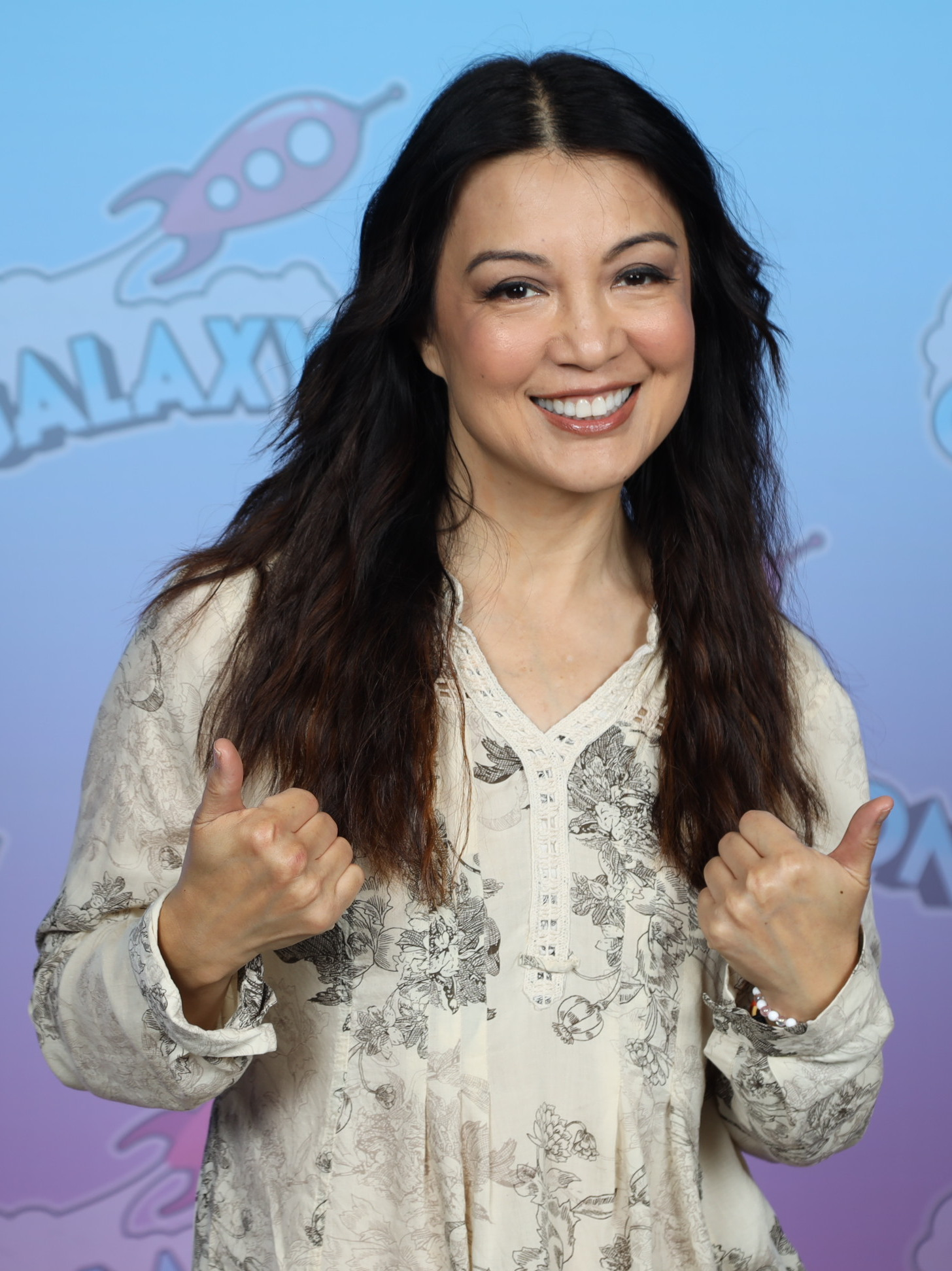
Ming-Na Wen, Best Actress in a Streaming Series winner

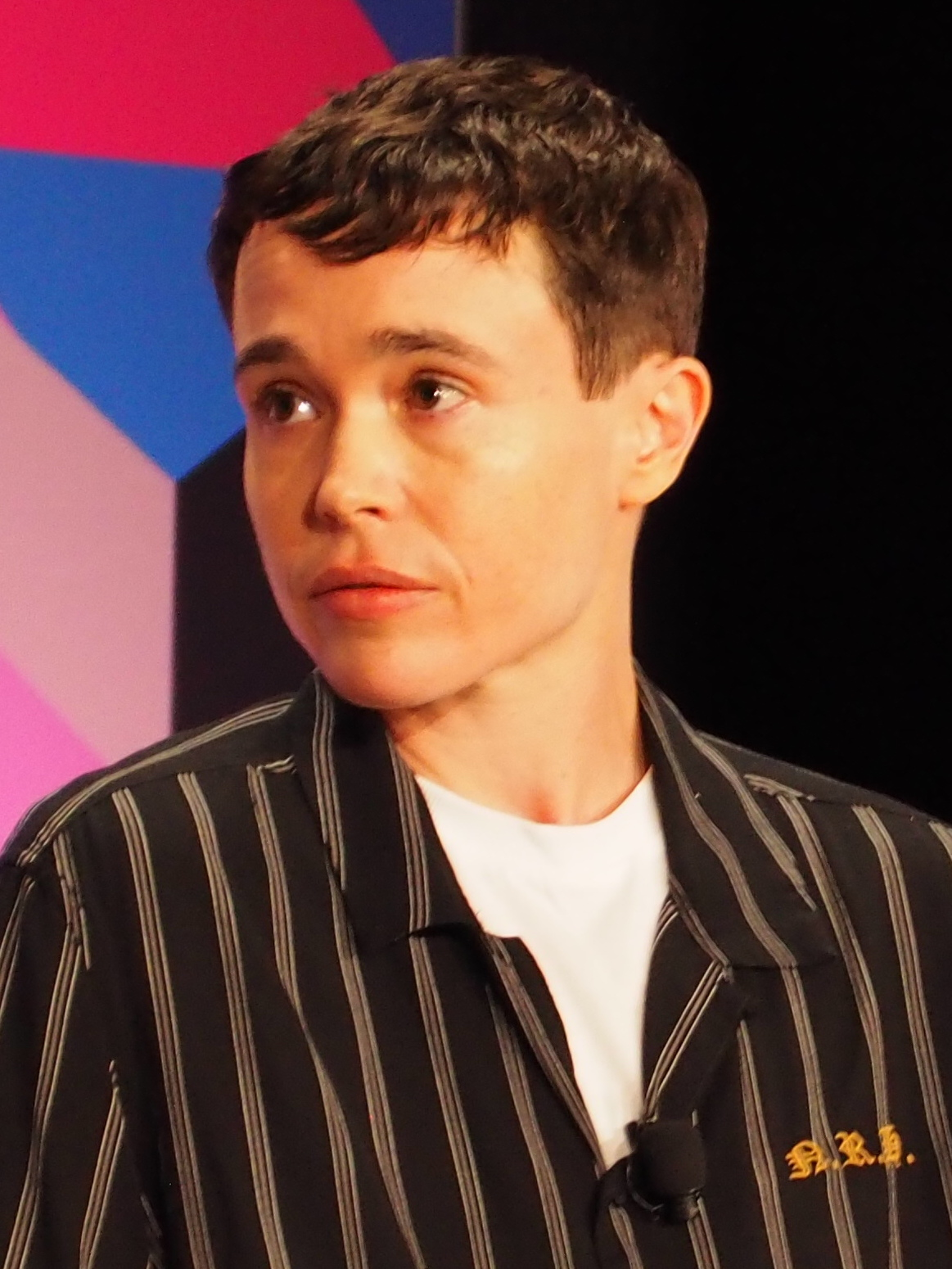
Elliot Page, Best Supporting Actor in a Streaming Series winner

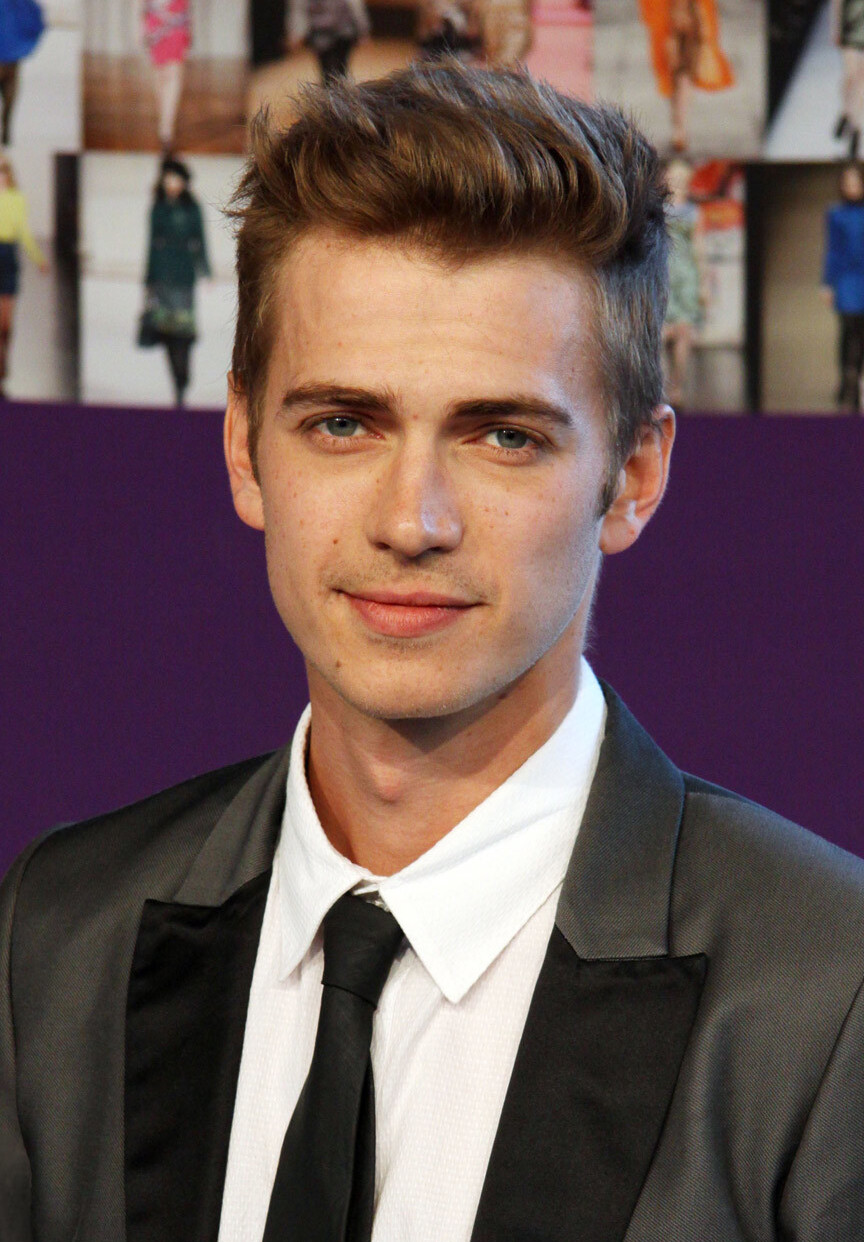
Hayden Christensen, Best Guest-Starring Performance in a Streaming Series winner

Network / Cable
Best Actor	Best Actress
Bob Odenkirk – Better Call Saul (AMC) as Jimmy McGill / Saul Goodman / Gene Takavic; Colman Domingo – Fear the Walking Dead (AMC) as Victor Strand; Chiwetel Ejiofor – The Man Who Fell to Earth (Showtime) as Faraday; Michael C. Hall – Dexter: New Blood (Showtime) as Dexter Morgan; Sam Heughan – Outlander (Starz) as Jamie Fraser; Tyler Hoechlin – Superman & Lois (The CW) as Clark Kent / Superman; Harold Perrineau – From (Epix) as Boyd Stevens	Rhea Seehorn – Better Call Saul (AMC) as Kim Wexler; Caitríona Balfe – Outlander (Starz) as Claire Fraser; Kylie Bunbury – Big Sky (ABC) as Cassie Dewell; Courteney Cox – Shining Vale (Starz) as Patricia "Pat" Phelps; Melanie Lynskey – Yellowjackets (Showtime) as Shauna Sadecki; Rose McIver – Ghosts (CBS) as Samantha Arondekar; Elizabeth Tulloch – Superman & Lois (The CW) as Lois Lane
Best Supporting Actor	Best Supporting Actress
Jonathan Banks – Better Call Saul (AMC) as Mike Ehrmantraut; Tony Dalton – Better Call Saul (AMC) as Lalo Salamanca; Patrick Fabian – Better Call Saul (AMC) as Howard Hamlin; Harvey Guillén – What We Do in the Shadows (FX) as Guillermo de la Cruz; Brandon Scott Jones – Ghosts (CBS) as Captain Isaac Higgintoot; Michael Mando – Better Call Saul (AMC) as Nacho Varga; Michael James Shaw – The Walking Dead (AMC) as Michael Mercer	Lauren Cohan – The Walking Dead (AMC) as Maggie Rhee; Emmanuelle Chriqui – Superman & Lois (The CW) as Lana Lang Cushing; Janina Gavankar – Big Sky (ABC) as Ren Bhullar; Julia Jones – Dexter: New Blood (Showtime) as Chief Angela Bishop; Melissa McBride – The Walking Dead (AMC) as Carol Peletier; Danielle Panabaker – The Flash (The CW) as Caitlin Snow / Frost; Sophie Skelton – Outlander (Starz) as Brianna MacKenzie
Best Performance by a Younger Actor	Best Guest-Starring Performance
Brec Bassinger – Stargirl (The CW) as Courtney Whitmore / Stargirl; Jack Alcott – Dexter: New Blood (Showtime) as Harrison Morgan; Zackary Arthur – Chucky (Syfy) as Jake Wheeler; Gus Birney – Shining Vale (Starz) as Gaynor Phelps; Jordan Elsass – Superman & Lois (The CW) as Jonathan Kent; Alex Garfin – Superman & Lois (The CW) as Jordan Kent	Jennifer Tilly – Chucky (Syfy) as Tiffany Valentine; Michael Biehn – The Walking Dead (AMC) as Ian; Rachael Harris – Ghosts (CBS) as Sheryl; Jesse James Keitel – Big Sky (ABC) as Jerrie Kennedy; Jeffrey Dean Morgan – The Walking Dead (AMC) as Negan; Fisher Stevens – The Blacklist (NBC) as Marvin Gerard; Aisha Tyler – Fear the Walking Dead (AMC) as Mickey
Streaming
Best Actor	Best Actress
Oscar Isaac – Moon Knight (Disney+) as Marc Spector / Moon Knight; Tom Hiddleston – Loki (Disney+) as Loki; Anthony Mackie – The Falcon and the Winter Soldier (Disney+) as Sam Wilson / Falcon; Ewan McGregor – Obi-Wan Kenobi (Disney+) as Obi-Wan Kenobi; Anson Mount – Star Trek: Strange New Worlds (Paramount+) as Captain Christopher Pike; Adam Scott – Severance (Apple TV+) as Mark Scout; Antony Starr – The Boys (Prime Video) as Homelander	Ming-Na Wen – The Book of Boba Fett (Disney+) as Fennec Shand; Millie Bobby Brown – Stranger Things (Netflix) as Eleven; Britt Lower – Severance (Apple TV+) as Helly Riggs; Erin Moriarty – The Boys (Prime Video) as Starlight / Annie January; Elizabeth Olsen – WandaVision (Disney+) as Wanda Maximoff / Scarlet Witch; Beth Riesgraf – Leverage: Redemption (FreeVee) as Parker; Kate Siegel – Midnight Mass (Netflix) as Erin Greene
Best Supporting Actor	Best Supporting Actress
Elliot Page – The Umbrella Academy (Netflix) as Viktor Hargreeves; Zach Cherry – Severance (Apple TV+) as Dylan George; Ethan Hawke – Moon Knight (Disney+) as Arthur Harrow; Joel Kinnaman – For All Mankind (Apple TV+) as Edward Baldwin; Ethan Peck – Star Trek: Strange New Worlds (Paramount+) as Spock; Joseph Quinn – Stranger Things (Netflix) as Eddie Munson; John Turturro – Severance (Apple TV+) as Irving Bailiff	Moses Ingram – Obi-Wan Kenobi (Disney+) as Reva Sevander / Third Sister; Patricia Arquette – Severance (Apple TV+) as Harmony Cobel; Danielle Brooks – Peacemaker (HBO Max) as Leota Adebayo; Jess Bush – Star Trek: Strange New Worlds (Paramount+) as Christine Chapel; Nell Tiger Free – Servant (Apple TV+) as Leanne Grayson; Kathryn Hahn – WandaVision (Disney+) as Agnes / Agatha Harkness; Aleyse Shannon – Leverage: Redemption (FreeVee) as Breanna Casey
Best Performance by a Younger Actor	Best Guest-Starring Performance
Iman Vellani – Ms. Marvel (Disney+) as Kamala Khan / Ms. Marvel; Vivien Lyra Blair – Obi-Wan Kenobi (Disney+) as Leia Organa; Maxwell Jenkins – Lost in Space (Netflix) as Will Robinson; Gaten Matarazzo – Stranger Things (Netflix) as Dustin Henderson; Sadie Sink – Stranger Things (Netflix) as Maxine "Max" Mayfield; Hailee Steinfeld – Hawkeye (Disney+) as Kate Bishop	Hayden Christensen – Obi-Wan Kenobi (Disney+) as Darth Vader; Jensen Ackles – The Boys (Prime Video) as Soldier Boy; LeVar Burton – Leverage: Redemption (FreeVee) as Robert Blanche; Tony Dalton – Hawkeye (Disney+) as Jack Duquesne; Rosario Dawson – The Mandalorian (Disney+) as Ahsoka Tano; Robert Englund – Stranger Things (Netflix) as Victor Creel; Jonathan Majors – Loki (Disney+) as He Who Remains / The Time-Keepers

=== Home Entertainment ===
Best 4K Special Edition Film Release	Best Classic Film Release
Everything Everywhere All at Once; Blood for Dracula; A Fistful of Dollars; Flesh for Frankenstein; For a Few Dollars More; The Great Escape; Invasion of the Body Snatchers	Theatre of Blood; The Incredible Shrinking Man (The Criterion Collection); Master of the World (Special Edition); The Secret of the Blue Room; Village of the Giants; The Wonderful World of the Brothers Grimm (Deluxe 2-Disc Special Edition)
Best Film Collection Release	Best Television Series Release
Universal Classic Monsters: Icons of Horror Collection [4K UHD] (Dracula, Drácula, Frankenstein, The Invisible Man, and The Wolf Man); The Alfred Hitchcock Classics Collection: Volume 2; Francis the Talking Mule 7 Film Collection; The Godfather Trilogy [4K]; Shawscope: Volume One; Val Lewton Double Feature: The Ghost Ship / Bedlam (Warner Archive Collection)	Chucky (Season 1); The Adventures of Ozzie and Harriet (Seasons 1 & 2); Creepshow (Season 2); Kolchak: The Night Stalker (The Complete Series); Night Gallery (Season One); The Six Million Dollar Man (The Complete Series)

=== Special Achievement Awards ===
- Dan Curtis Legacy Award – Julie Plec
- Life Career Award – Kathryn Leigh Scott
- Producer's Showcase Award – Geoff Johns
- Robert Forster Artist's Award – The Cast of Better Call Saul
- Breakthrough Performance Award – Amber Midthunder (Prey)

== Multiple nominations ==
Film
Nominations	Film	Genre
12	The Batman	Superhero
10	Nightmare Alley	Thriller
9	Spider-Man: No Way Home	Superhero
8	Everything Everywhere All at Once	Fantasy
7	Nope	Science Fiction
7	Shang-Chi and the Legend of the Ten Rings	Superhero
5	The Black Phone	Horror
5	Cruella	Fantasy
5	Dune	Science Fiction
5	Top Gun: Maverick	Action / Adventure
4	Doctor Strange in the Multiverse of Madness	Superhero
4	Ghostbusters: Afterlife	Fantasy
4	A Quiet Place Part II	Horror
4	The Suicide Squad	Superhero
3	Crimes of the Future	Science Fiction
3	Last Night in Soho	Horror
3	RRR	Action / Adventure
3	Thor: Love and Thunder	Superhero
2	Ambulance	Thriller
2	Free Guy	Science Fiction
2	Godzilla vs. Kong	Science Fiction
2	Jurassic World Dominion	Science Fiction
2	Luca	Animated
2	Scream	Horror
2	West Side Story	Action / Adventure

Television (Network / Cable)
Nominations	Series	Genre	Network
7	Better Call Saul	Action / Thriller	AMC
6	Superman & Lois	Science Fiction	The CW
6	The Walking Dead	Horror	AMC
4	Big Sky	Action / Thriller	ABC
4	Chucky	Horror	Syfy
4	Dexter: New Blood	Action / Thriller	Showtime
4	Ghosts	Fantasy	CBS
4	Outlander	Action / Thriller	Starz
3	Fear the Walking Dead	Horror	AMC
3	Shining Vale	Fantasy	Starz
2	The Blacklist	Action / Thriller	NBC
2	The Flash	Science Fiction	The CW
2	From	Horror	Epix
2	The Man Who Fell to Earth	Science Fiction	Showtime
2	Stargirl	Fantasy	The CW
2	What We Do in the Shadows	Horror	FX
2	Yellowjackets	Action / Thriller	Showtime

Television (Streaming)
Nominations	Series	Genre	Service
6	Severance	Horror / Thriller	Apple TV+
6	Stranger Things	Horror / Thriller	Netflix
5	Obi-Wan Kenobi	Limited	Disney+
4	The Boys	Action / Adventure	Prime Video
4	Leverage: Redemption	Action / Adventure	FreeVee
4	Star Trek: Strange New Worlds	Science Fiction	Paramount+
3	Hawkeye	Limited	Disney+
3	Loki	Fantasy	Disney+
3	Moon Knight	Limited	Disney+
3	WandaVision	Fantasy	Disney+
2	The Book of Boba Fett	Limited	Disney+
2	Creepshow	Horror / Thriller	Shudder
2	For All Mankind	Science Fiction	Apple TV+
2	Lost in Space	Science Fiction	Netflix
2	The Mandalorian	Science Fiction	Disney+
2	Midnight Mass	Limited	Netflix
2	Ms. Marvel	Limited	Disney+
2	Peacemaker	Action / Adventure	HBO Max
2	Servant	Horror / Thriller	Apple TV+
2	The Umbrella Academy	Action / Adventure	Netflix

== Multiple wins ==
Film
Wins	Film	Genre
3	Everything Everywhere All at Once	Fantasy
3	Nightmare Alley	Thriller
3	Top Gun: Maverick	Action / Adventure
2	The Batman	Superhero

Television (Network / Cable)
Wins	Series	Genre	Network
4	Better Call Saul	Action / Adventure	AMC
2	The Walking Dead	Horror	AMC

Television (Streaming)
Wins	Series	Genre	Platform
3	Obi-Wan Kenobi	Limited	Disney+
