= My Aunt Aline =

- French: Ma tante Aline
- Directed by: Gabriel Pelletier
- Written by: Stéphane J. Bureau; Frédéric Ouellet
- Produced by: Lorraine Richard; Luc Martineau
- Starring: Béatrice Picard; Sylvie Léonard
- Cinematography: Éric Cayla
- Edited by: Gaétan Huot
- Music by: Benoît Charest
- Distributed by: Alliance Atlantis Vivafilm
- Release date: July 20, 2007
- Running time: 107 minutes
- Country: Canada
- Language: French

My Aunt Aline (French: Ma tante Aline) is a 2007 Canadian comedy film directed by Gabriel Pelletier.

== Plot ==
Geneviève Saint-Louis (Sylvie Léonard) is a successful career woman who does nothing but work. One day, her aunt Aline (Béatrice Picard) shows up unexpectedly on her doorstep penniless and just one step away from a retirement home. Determined to stay out, Aline turns Geneviève's life upside-down as she takes her on the ride of her life that includes a stop in Cuba.

== Awards ==
Picard received a Genie Award nomination for Best Actress at the 28th Genie Awards. The film received two Jutra Award nominations at the 10th Jutra Awards, for Best Hair (Réjean Forget) and Best Makeup (Kathryn Casault); Forget won the award for Best Hair.
