= Suzanne Stokes-Munton =

British hairstylist

- Occupation: Hairstylist

Suzanne Stokes-Munton is a British hairstylist. She was nominated for an Academy Award in the category Best Makeup and Hairstyling for the film Nosferatu.

In addition to her Academy Award nomination, she was nominated for two Primetime Emmy Awards in the category Outstanding Hairstyling for her work on the television programs The Odyssey and Dinotopia. She won the Goya Award for Best Makeup and Hairstyles for her work with Jan Sewell on the film Agora (2009).

== Selected filmography ==
- Nosferatu (2024; co-nominated with David White and Traci Loader)
