= Canadian Screen Award for Best Makeup =

Annual Canadian film award

- Country: Canada
- Presented by: Academy of Canadian Cinema & Television
- First award: 1990
- Currently held by: Charlotte Gavaris & Chris Bridges for At the Place of Ghosts (2025)
- Website: academy.ca/awards

The Canadian Screen Award for Best Makeup is an annual Canadian film award category, presented as part of the Genie Awards prior to 2012 and Canadian Screen Awards since 2012, to honour achievements by make-up artists in the Canadian film industry.

As the Canadian film industry was historically dominated by naturalistic films that rarely required very complex make-up work, the award was originally created as a special achievement award rather than a regular category. It was presented at the discretion of the Academy of Canadian Cinema and Television when it deemed a film's make-up work to be worthy of special recognition, and was awarded for the first time at the 11th Genie Awards in 1990 to recognize Jacques Lafleur and Pierre Saindon for their work in the film Cruising Bar, in which Michel Côté played four different characters. The award was next given at the 18th Genie Awards in 1997, again to Saindon for his work in Karmina.

The award was not presented again until the 27th Genie Awards, but was then presented at both the 28th Genie Awards and the 29th Genie Awards.

Beginning with the 30th Genie Awards, the award has since been presented annually as a conventional category with a full advance shortlist of nominees.

== Winners and nominees ==
=== 1990s ===
| Year | Winner | Film | Ref |
|---|---|---|---|
1990; 11th Genie Awards
| 1990; 11th Genie Awards | Jacques Lafleur, Pierre Saindon | Cruising Bar | |
1997; 18th Genie Awards
| 1997; 18th Genie Awards | Pierre Saindon | Karmina | |

== 2000s ==
| Year | Nominee | Film |
|---|---|---|
2006; 27th Genie Awards
| 2006; 27th Genie Awards | Nick Dudman | Beowulf & Grendel |
2007; 28th Genie Awards
| 2007; 28th Genie Awards | Stéphan Dupuis | Eastern Promises |
2008; 29th Genie Awards
| 2008; 29th Genie Awards | Adrien Morot, Réjean Goderre, Marie-France Guy, Bruno Gatien, Nathalie Trépanier | Cruising Bar 2 |
2009; 30th Genie Awards
| 2009; 30th Genie Awards | Djina Caron, André Duval | The Master Key (Grande Ourse: La Clé des possibles) |
| 2009; 30th Genie Awards | Robbi O'Quinn, Leanne Morrison | You Might As Well Live |
| 2009; 30th Genie Awards | Djina Caron, Martin Rivest | Polytechnique |
| 2009; 30th Genie Awards | Diane Simard, Réjean Goderre | Love and Savagery |
| 2009; 30th Genie Awards | Micheline Trépanier, Linda Gordon | 1981 |

== 2010s ==
| Year | Nominee | Film |
|---|---|---|
2010; 31st Genie Awards
| 2010; 31st Genie Awards | Adrien Morot, Micheline Trépanier | Barney's Version |
| 2010; 31st Genie Awards | Kathryn Casault | Incendies |
| 2010; 31st Genie Awards | Paul Jones, Leslie Sebert, Vincent Sullivan | Resident Evil: Afterlife |
| 2010; 31st Genie Awards | Hélène-Manon Poudrette | The Wild Hunt |
| 2010; 31st Genie Awards | Marlène Rouleau, C.J. Goldman | 7 Days (Les 7 jours du Talion) |
2011; 32nd Genie Awards
| 2011; 32nd Genie Awards | Christiane Fattori, Frédéric Marin | Café de Flore |
| 2011; 32nd Genie Awards | Amber Makar | Amazon Falls |
| 2011; 32nd Genie Awards | Virginie Paré | BumRush |
| 2011; 32nd Genie Awards | Tammy Lou Pate | Snow & Ashes |
| 2011; 32nd Genie Awards | Leslie Sebert, David R. Beecroft | Take This Waltz |
2012; 1st Canadian Screen Awards
| 2012; 1st Canadian Screen Awards | Colleen Quinton, Kathy Kelso | Laurence Anyways |
| 2012; 1st Canadian Screen Awards | Katie Brennan, Karola Dirnberger, Paul Jones | Silent Hill: Revelation 3D |
| 2012; 1st Canadian Screen Awards | Cathie Davies-Irvine, Trason Fernandes | Antiviral |
| 2012; 1st Canadian Screen Awards | Brenda Magalas, Lori Caputi | Goon |
| 2012; 1st Canadian Screen Awards | Marlène Rouleau, André Duval | L'Affaire Dumont |
2013; 2nd Canadian Screen Awards
| 2013; 2nd Canadian Screen Awards | Jo-Ann Macneil, Karola Dirnberger, Paul Jones | The Mortal Instruments: City of Bones |
| 2013; 2nd Canadian Screen Awards | Brigitte Bilodeau | Maïna |
| 2013; 2nd Canadian Screen Awards | François Dagenais, Traci Loader | Cottage Country |
| 2013; 2nd Canadian Screen Awards | Louise Mackintosh, Peggy Kyriakidou, Shauna Llewellyn | The Colony |
| 2013; 2nd Canadian Screen Awards | David Martí, Linda Dowds, Montse Ribé | Mama |
2014; 3rd Canadian Screen Awards
| 2014; 3rd Canadian Screen Awards | Maïna Militza | Mommy |
| 2014; 3rd Canadian Screen Awards | Virginie Boudreau | 1987 |
| 2014; 3rd Canadian Screen Awards | Lizane Lasalle | Henri Henri |
| 2014; 3rd Canadian Screen Awards | Colleen Quinton | Meetings with a Young Poet |
| 2014; 3rd Canadian Screen Awards | Amanda O'Leary | Trailer Park Boys: Don't Legalize It |
2015; 4th Canadian Screen Awards
| 2015; 4th Canadian Screen Awards | Sid Armour | Room |
| 2015; 4th Canadian Screen Awards | Catherine Beaudoin | Anna |
| 2015; 4th Canadian Screen Awards | Jayne Dancose, Debra Johnson, Charles Porlier | Hyena Road |
| 2015; 4th Canadian Screen Awards | Gail Kennedy, Rochelle Parrent, Jojo Preece | Forsaken |
| 2015; 4th Canadian Screen Awards | David Scott, Trina Brink | Backcountry |
2016; 5th Canadian Screen Awards
| 2016; 5th Canadian Screen Awards | Maïna Militza, Denis Vidal | It's Only the End of the World (Juste la fin du monde) |
| 2016; 5th Canadian Screen Awards | Kathryn Casault | Two Lovers and a Bear |
| 2016; 5th Canadian Screen Awards | Lynda McCormack | Born to Be Blue |
| 2016; 5th Canadian Screen Awards | Melissa Meretsky, Jennifer Walton, Lisa Belyea | The Northlander |
| 2016; 5th Canadian Screen Awards | Natalie Trépanier, Réjean Goderre | Race |
2017; 6th Canadian Screen Awards
| 2017; 6th Canadian Screen Awards | Erik Gosselin, Marie-France Guy | Ravenous (Les Affamés) |
| 2017; 6th Canadian Screen Awards | Kathryn Casault | Hochelaga, Land of Souls (Hochelaga terre des âmes) |
| 2017; 6th Canadian Screen Awards | Sonia Dolan | The Man Who Invented Christmas |
| 2017; 6th Canadian Screen Awards | Bruno Gatien | All You Can Eat Buddha |
| 2017; 6th Canadian Screen Awards | Marlène Rouleau | Bon Cop, Bad Cop 2 |
2018; 7th Canadian Screen Awards
| 2018; 7th Canadian Screen Awards | Françoise Quilichini | Just a Breath Away (Dans la brume) |
| 2018; 7th Canadian Screen Awards | Lauryn Ford | Crown and Anchor |
| 2018; 7th Canadian Screen Awards | Carla Hutchinson | Brown Girl Begins |
| 2018; 7th Canadian Screen Awards | Tammy-Lou Pate | Venus |
| 2018; 7th Canadian Screen Awards | Fanny Vachon | The Fall of Sparta (La chute de Sparte) |
2019; 8th Canadian Screen Awards
| 2019; 8th Canadian Screen Awards | Fanny Vachon | The Song of Names |
| 2019; 8th Canadian Screen Awards | Brandi Boulet, Chris Bridges | Riot Girls |
| 2019; 8th Canadian Screen Awards | Randy Daudlin | Goalie |
| 2019; 8th Canadian Screen Awards | Emily O'Quinn, Steve Newburn, Neil Morrill | Run This Town |
| 2019; 8th Canadian Screen Awards | Candice Ornstein | American Woman |

== 2020s ==
| Year | Nominee | Film | Ref |
|---|---|---|---|
2020; 9th Canadian Screen Awards
| 2020; 9th Canadian Screen Awards | Erik Gosselin, Joan-Patricia Parris, Jean-Michel Rossignol, Nancy Ferlatte | Blood Quantum | |
| 2020; 9th Canadian Screen Awards | Sidney Armour | The Marijuana Conspiracy | |
| 2020; 9th Canadian Screen Awards | Elizabeth Gruszka | Funny Boy | |
| 2020; 9th Canadian Screen Awards | Dan Martin, Traci Loader, Dorota Mitoraj | Possessor | |
| 2020; 9th Canadian Screen Awards | Emily O'Quinn, Paul Jones, Emma Lee Hilton | Random Acts of Violence | |
2021; 10th Canadian Screen Awards
| 2021; 10th Canadian Screen Awards | Traci Loader | Night Raiders | |
| 2021; 10th Canadian Screen Awards | Djina Caron | Maria Chapdelaine | |
| 2021; 10th Canadian Screen Awards | Erik Gosselin, Edwina Voda | Brain Freeze | |
| 2021; 10th Canadian Screen Awards | Kristin Loeck, Calla-Syna Dreyer | Dangerous | |
| 2021; 10th Canadian Screen Awards | Karlee Morse, Stephanie Pringle | The Retreat | |
2022; 11th Canadian Screen Awards
| 2022; 11th Canadian Screen Awards | Alexandra Anger, Monica Pavez | Crimes of the Future | |
| 2022; 11th Canadian Screen Awards | Katie Ballantyne, Jonathan Craig | Cult Hero | |
| 2022; 11th Canadian Screen Awards | Joan Chell | Brother | |
| 2022; 11th Canadian Screen Awards | Marie-Josée Galibert | Viking | |
| 2022; 11th Canadian Screen Awards | Darci Jackson, Elizabeth McLeod | Bones of Crows | |
2023; 12th Canadian Screen Awards
| 2023; 12th Canadian Screen Awards | Dan Martin, Traci Loader, Svetlana Gutic | Infinity Pool | |
| 2023; 12th Canadian Screen Awards | Katie Ballantyne, Jonathan Craig, Karlee Morse | The Hyperborean | |
| 2023; 12th Canadian Screen Awards | Dominique T. Hasbani | Ru | |
| 2023; 12th Canadian Screen Awards | Fatema Hoque | Who's Yer Father? | |
| 2023; 12th Canadian Screen Awards | Karlee Morse, Mary Cuffe | Polaris | |
| 2023; 12th Canadian Screen Awards | Erin Pidgeon | Zombie Town | |
| 2023; 12th Canadian Screen Awards | Ashley Vieira, Erin Sweeney, Thea Samuels | BlackBerry | |
2024; 13th Canadian Screen Awards
| 2024; 13th Canadian Screen Awards | Colin Penman, Brandi Boulet, Sean Sansom | The Apprentice | |
| 2024; 13th Canadian Screen Awards | Rachel Affolter, Alexandra Anger, Monica Pavez | Humane | |
| 2024; 13th Canadian Screen Awards | Diane Mazur, Alexandra Anger, Monica Pavez | The Shrouds | |
| 2024; 13th Canadian Screen Awards | Doug Morrow | Deaner '89 | |
| 2024; 13th Canadian Screen Awards | Marie Salvado | Universal Language (Une langue universelle) | |
2025; 14th Canadian Screen Awards
| 2025; 14th Canadian Screen Awards | Charlotte Gavaris, Chris Bridges | At the Place of Ghosts (Sk+te’kmujue’katik) | |
| 2025; 14th Canadian Screen Awards | Heather Jennings, Steven Kostanski, Patrick Baxter | Scared Shitless | |
| 2025; 14th Canadian Screen Awards | Niamh McCann, Tenille Shockey, François Dagenais | Honey Bunch | |
| 2025; 14th Canadian Screen Awards | Ashly Mckessock | Soul's Road | |
| 2025; 14th Canadian Screen Awards | Erin Sweeney, Jaye Falcioni, Tanya Bishoff | Deathstalker | |

== See also ==
- Prix Iris for Best Makeup
