= Monica Pavez =

Monica Pavez is a Canadian special effects make-up artist in film and television, who won the Canadian Screen Award for Best Makeup at the 11th Canadian Screen Awards in 2023 alongside Alexandra Anger for their work on the film Crimes of the Future.

With Evi Zafiropoulou, Anger and Pavez also received a Saturn Award nomination for Best Makeup at the 47th Saturn Awards in 2022.
