= Blood Quantum (film) =

2019 Canadian horror film

- Promotional release poster
- Directed by: Jeff Barnaby
- Written by: Jeff Barnaby
- Produced by: John Christou; Robert Vroom
- Starring: Michael Greyeyes; Elle-Máijá Tailfeathers; Forrest Goodluck; Kiowa Gordon; Brandon Oakes; Kawennáhere Devery Jacobs; Gary Farmer
- Cinematography: Michel St-Martin
- Edited by: Jeff Barnaby
- Production company: Prospector Films
- Distributed by: Elevation Pictures
- Release date: September 5, 2019 (TIFF)
- Running time: 96 minutes
- Country: Canada
- Languages: English; Mi'kmaq

Blood Quantum is a 2019 Canadian horror film written, directed, and edited by Jeff Barnaby and starring Michael Greyeyes, Elle-Máijá Tailfeathers, Forrest Goodluck, Kiowa Gordon, Brandon Oakes, Olivia Scriven, Kawennáhere Devery Jacobs, and Gary Farmer. The film depicts the effects of a zombie uprising on a First Nations reserve whose residents are immune to contracting the plague because of their indigenous genetics, but must still cope with the consequences of its effects on the world around them, including white refugees seeking shelter on the reserve.

Blood Quantum premiered at the 2019 Toronto International Film Festival, where it was named second runner-up for the People's Choice Award: Midnight Madness. The film was made available for streaming on Shudder in the United States, the United Kingdom, and Ireland on April 28, 2020, and has received generally positive reviews from critics, receiving the most nominations of any film at the 9th Canadian Screen Awards with 10 nominations, ultimately winning seven.

== Plot ==
In 1981, on the Red Crow Indian Reservation in Quebec, Canada, fisherman Gisigu catches a number of salmon, and observes that they continue to move after being gutted. Elsewhere that morning, Gisigu's son, sheriff Traylor, responds to a call about a dying dog that belongs to his ex-wife, nurse Joss. Traylor euthanizes the dog with a gun. He visits Joss and learns that their son Joseph has been arrested for vandalism in nearby Hollarbaster and is in jail with his half-brother Lysol. Traylor visits his father, who shows him the gutted yet moving salmon. Joss's dead dog reanimates in the trunk of Traylor's police car and Traylor shoots it again. Gisigu and Traylor set the dog and the fish on fire.

Traylor and Joss head into town to free Joseph from jail. Traylor, Joseph, Lysol, and police officer Shamu encounter an ill, violent man in the jail who bites Joseph on the arm. Joseph goes to a hospital where his white, pregnant girlfriend Charlie is waiting. That night, Traylor responds to a call from an indigenous man named Shooker. Traylor is attacked and bitten by Shooker's white girlfriend, whom Traylor beats with the butt of a shotgun. Traylor and Shooker head to a bridge where Joss, Joseph, and Charlie have found themselves after having escaped the hospital in an ambulance.

Six months later, the outbreak of flesh-eating "zeds" has become widespread and the Red Crow Reservation has been turned into a fortified compound. Its residents have learned that white people can be infected by the "zed" plague, while indigenous people seem to be immune. Lysol has become increasingly aggressive towards Joseph and others' tendency to bring outsiders—such as a man and his young daughter, the latter of whom was bitten by an infected person, as well as a girl named Lilith, who hides the fact that she has also been infected—to the compound.

That night, at Lysol's shelter away from the compound, Joseph finds a now-zombified Lilith chewing on Lysol's penis as he is crying on the floor from the pain. Joseph, Lysol and Moon then drive back to the compound with Lilith in restraints. Believing that the policy of letting in white survivors led to his disfigurement, Lysol snaps, stabbing Joseph with a knife and letting Lilith loose inside the compound. Traylor and Gisigu, who went on a mission to eliminate zombies at a gas station with fellow tribesmen Bumper and Shooker, return to the compound to find it overrun with zombies. They learn that Joss, Joseph, Charlie, and eight other survivors are trapped in the compound's basement. While rescuing them, Shooker is able to drive away some of the survivors, but Traylor is eaten alive by zombies so that his family can escape.

Joss, Joseph and Charlie escape with Gisigu and Bumper. While Gisigu and Joseph enter a church to stop two of Lysol's acquaintances from murdering a group of survivors, Lysol finds Joss, Charlie and Bumper. Lysol backstabs Bumper and heavily wounds him. Joss shoots Lysol, but not before Lysol is able to unleash a zombie from the trunk of a car. The zombie bites Charlie before Joseph kills it. Joseph and Gisigu lead a wounded Lysol away from the scene, and Joseph stabs Lysol. Gisigu alerts zombies to Lysol's location with a gunshot, and the zombies proceed to eat Lysol alive.

They think all hope is lost as the one remaining boat able to allow their escape is burning, but Shooker returns for them in two boats. He takes Bumper in his boat while Joseph, Charlie and Joss set out with the other boat. Armed with a sword, Gisigu stays behind on land to fight off the zombies and is implied to survive as he stands with the last zombie's head in his hand. On the boat, Charlie gives birth to a baby girl. As she is about to succumb to her bite wound, she asks Joseph to kill her before she transforms into a zombie, and he mournfully complies. The boat continues to drift in the water with the survivors' final fate unknown.

== Cast ==
- Michael Greyeyes as Traylor
- Elle-Máijá Tailfeathers as Joss
- Forrest Goodluck as Joseph
- Kiowa Gordon as Lysol
- Olivia Scriven as Charlie
- Stonehorse Lone Goeman as Gisigu
- Brandon Oakes as Bumper
- William Belleau as Shooker
- Kawennáhere Devery Jacobs as James
- Gary Farmer as Moon
- Kent McQuaid as Shamu
- Natalie Liconti as Lilith
- Felicia Shulman as Doris
- Jason Kwan as Jade
- Tanner Zipchen as Gate Zombie

== Production ==
Blood Quantum was filmed in 2018, primarily at the Kahnawake and Listuguj reserves in Quebec. Additional footage was shot in the city of Campbellton, New Brunswick.

The film's title refers to blood quantum laws, which have been used in the United States and Canada to determine indigeneity based on the percentage of one's indigenous ancestry. Barnaby has described the film as a commentary on colonialism.

The film is deliberately set in 1981, the same year of the Listuguj raids, in which a group of game wardens, fisheries officers and Quebec Provincial Police officers raided Listuguj, arresting and beating many of its members and confiscating their fishing equipment. Members who were not incarcerated erected barricades, and a second raid by the authorities was conducted in retaliation. Before commencing production, Barnaby had all the actors watch Incident at Restigouche, the influential 1984 documentary film about the Listuguj raids by Alanis Obomsawin.

== Themes and cultural elements ==
The Mi’kmaq language is the predominant language in the film and the native tongue of Traylor and his family. In a scene where it is spoken by Indigenous characters as they discuss what to do with non-Indigenous refugees, the refugees demand that they speak English. Nicholas DeShaw of A Tribe Called Geek describes this as a situation where the Indigenous language holds power over English; English is the language begging to be heard.

The main character Traylor wears his hair in double braids, a subtle expression of Native identity and cultural preservation. Braids are a common style worn by Indigenous people, having the belief that the three strands in a braid represent the body, mind, and spirit.

An underlying theme evident from beginning to end in Blood Quantum is that of generational trauma and the historical tension that exists between white and Native individuals. Native movie reviewer Eve Tushnet writes that we are bound up in one another’s lives, white and Native inextricably linked by present bonds of love as well as past bonds of injustice.

Indigenous peoples roamed "North America" thousands of years before white colonizers showed up, and debate over the rightful owners of the land have never been settled. The concept of Natives being immune to the virus and non-natives being susceptible to getting infected is a subtle way of questioning who the rightful owners of Canadian land are, another theme present in the film. Brian Tallerico of Roger Ebert Reviews states that "it’s almost as if the planet is trying to give itself back to the ones who truly deserve it".

The characters of Blood Quantum are plagued with real world problems such as addiction and the issues associated with them. The best example of this is Lysol's transformation from hero to villain in the film—he goes from protecting the reservation to inadvertently destroying it. Lysol is a symbol of humankind's downfall being a direct result of its violent and arrogant tendencies.

== Release ==
Blood Quantum was brought to the Cannes Film Market in May 2019 as part of "Fantastic 7", a program of genre films sponsored by various international film festivals, where it was sponsored by the Toronto International Film Festival. Its public world premiere took place at the 2019 Toronto International Film Festival, where it was named second runner-up for the People's Choice Award: Midnight Madness.

The film was acquired for international distribution on the Shudder streaming service in 2019, with Canadian streaming rights to be held by Crave. The film was made available for streaming on Shudder in the United States, the United Kingdom and Ireland on April 28, 2020.

== Reception ==
On the review aggregator website Rotten Tomatoes, the film holds an approval rating of 90% based on 94 reviews, with an average rating of 7.2/10. The website's critics consensus reads: "Blood Quantum blends bloody horror with sociopolitical subtext, taking a fresh bite out of the crowded zombie genre in the bargain." On Metacritic, the film has a weighted average score of 63 out of 100 based on 11 critics, indicating "generally favorable reviews".

Elisabeth Vincentelli of The New York Times gave the film a mostly positive review, writing that its "central premise is inspired: When dead people come back to ersatz life, it turns out that Indigenous folks are immune — a sardonic twist on their ancestors succumbing to diseases imported by the European settlers." Matthew Monagle of The Austin Chronicle gave the film a score of three-and-a-half stars out of five, and wrote that it "rejects the default white gaze of so many horror films, choosing to tell a story through an unapologetically Indigenous lens." Joe Lipsett of Bloody Disgusting wrote that "Blood Quantum serves both as a reasonably entertaining zombie film, but more importantly, as a vital socio-political critique of real historical events in Canada." Shea Vassar, a Cherokee Nation staff writer of Film Daze, wrote that "Barnaby is ushering in a new era of Indigenous filmmaking. While still addressing some of the post-colonial pain that exists within communities today, Blood Quantum is a refreshing break from the same sad drama that is usually regurgitated when filmmakers, even those from an Indigenous or Native background, attempt to talk about the Indian experience."

The Guardian's Benjamin Lee gave the film three out of five stars, writing that it is "best taken as a violent slab of late-night exploitation, made notable by a powerful conceit and some evocative visuals. It's just a shame that the execution can't quite catch up with the premise." Brian Tallerico of RogerEbert.com gave the film two-and-a-half out of four stars, commending its action and social commentary but criticizing its "poor performances and awkward dialogue". David Ehrlich of IndieWire gave the film a grade of "C+", writing: "The filmmaking in Blood Quantum is seldom as compelling as its premise, and it's frustrating to watch such a fresh take on the zombie genre be mired in several of its most rotten tropes. [...] But when it works it works".

== Awards ==
Award	Date of ceremony	Category	Nominees	Result	Reference
Canadian Screen Awards	May 20, 2021	Best Actor	Michael Greyeyes	Won	
Canadian Screen Awards	May 20, 2021	Best Original Screenplay	Jeff Barnaby	Nominated	
Canadian Screen Awards	May 20, 2021	Best Art Direction/Production Design	Louisa Schabas, Sylvain Lemaitre	Won	
Canadian Screen Awards	May 20, 2021	Best Cinematography	Michel St-Martin	Nominated	
Canadian Screen Awards	May 20, 2021	Best Costume Design	Noémi Poulin	Won	
Canadian Screen Awards	May 20, 2021	Best Editing	Jeff Barnaby	Won	
Canadian Screen Awards	May 20, 2021	Best Makeup	Erik Gosselin, Joan-Patricia Parris, Jean-Michel Rossignol, Nancy Ferlatte	Won	
Canadian Screen Awards	May 20, 2021	Best Casting in a Film	Rene Haynes	Nominated	
Canadian Screen Awards	May 20, 2021	Best Visual Effects	Joshua Sherrett, Barbara Rosenstein, Ibi Atemie, David Atexide, Juan Carlos Ferrá, Alex Flynn, Andrei Gheorghiu, Felix Sherrett-Brown, Ali Hamidikia, Tony Wu	Won	
Canadian Screen Awards	May 20, 2021	Best Stunt Coordination	Jean Frenette, Jean-François Lachapelle	Won	
Prix Iris	June 6, 2021	Best Art Direction	Sylvain Lemaitre, Louisa Schabas	Nominated	
Prix Iris	June 6, 2021	Best Costume Design	Noémi Poulin	Nominated	
Prix Iris	June 6, 2021	Best Hair	Marcelo Nestor Padovani	Nominated	
Prix Iris	June 6, 2021	Best Makeup	Joan-Patricia Parris, Nancy Ferlatte, Erik Gosselin	Won	
Prix Iris	June 6, 2021	Best Visual Effects	Barbara Rosenstein, Josh Sherrett	Nominated	
Vancouver International Film Festival	2019	Best Canadian Film		Runner-up	
