= Prix Iris for Best Makeup =

Annual Canadian film award

The Prix Iris for Best Makeup (French: Prix Iris du meilleur maquillage) is an annual film award, presented by Québec Cinéma as part of its Prix Iris awards program, to honour the year's best makeup work in films made within the Cinema of Quebec.

The award was presented for the first time at the 6th Jutra Awards in 2004.

Until 2016, it was known as the Jutra Award for Best Makeup in memory of influential Quebec film director Claude Jutra. Following the withdrawal of Jutra's name from the award, the 2016 award was presented under the name Québec Cinéma. The Prix Iris name was announced in October 2016.

Kathryn Casault received the most nominations, fifteen, but only managed to win one award in 2009 for Babine.

== 2000s ==
Year	Winners and nominees	Film	Ref
2004; 6th Jutra Awards
2004; 6th Jutra Awards	Brigitte Bilodeau	Far Side of the Moon (La Face cachée de la lune)	
2004; 6th Jutra Awards	Claudette Beaudoin-Casavant	Red Nose (Nez rouge)	
2004; 6th Jutra Awards	Evelyne Byot, Diane Simard	The Barbarian Invasions (Les Invasions barbares)	
2004; 6th Jutra Awards	Kathryn Casault	8:17 p.m. Darling Street (20h17 rue Darling)	
2005; 7th Jutra Awards
2005; 7th Jutra Awards	Marie-Angèle Breitner	Bittersweet Memories (Ma vie en cinémascope)	
2005; 7th Jutra Awards	Claudette Beaudoin-Casavant	The Last Tunnel (Le Dernier tunnel)	
2005; 7th Jutra Awards	Kathryn Casault	Battle of the Brave (Nouvelle-France)	
2005; 7th Jutra Awards	Odile Ferlatte	The Five of Us (Elles étaient cinq)	
2006; 8th Jutra Awards
2006; 8th Jutra Awards	Micheline Trépanier	C.R.A.Z.Y.	
2006; 8th Jutra Awards	Kathryn Casault	Audition (L'Audition)	
2006; 8th Jutra Awards	Adrien Morot, Diane Simard	Aurore	
2006; 8th Jutra Awards	Diane Simard	The Rocket (Maurice Richard)	
2007; 9th Jutra Awards
2007; 9th Jutra Awards	Marie-Angèle Breitner	A Sunday in Kigali (Un dimanche à Kigali)	
2007; 9th Jutra Awards	Claudette Beaudoin-Casavant	Bon Cop, Bad Cop	
2007; 9th Jutra Awards	Marie-Angèle Breitner	A Family Secret (Le secret de ma mère)	
2007; 9th Jutra Awards	Nicole Lapierre	Angel's Rage (La Rage de l'ange)	
2008; 10th Jutra Awards
2008; 10th Jutra Awards	Diane Simard	Days of Darkness (L'Âge des ténèbres)	
2008; 10th Jutra Awards	Kathryn Casault	My Aunt Aline (Ma tante Aline)	
2008; 10th Jutra Awards	Johanne Gravel	Nitro	
2008; 10th Jutra Awards	Marlène Rouleau	The 3 L'il Pigs (Les 3 P'tits Cochons)	
2009; 11th Jutra Awards
2009; 11th Jutra Awards	Kathryn Casault	Babine	
2009; 11th Jutra Awards	Claudette Beaudoin-Casavant	The Deserter (Le Déserteur)	
2009; 11th Jutra Awards	Marie-Angèle Breitner	Borderline	
2009; 11th Jutra Awards	C.J. Goldman	The Descendant	

== 2010s ==
Year	Winners and nominees	Film	Ref
2010; 12th Jutra Awards
2010; 12th Jutra Awards	Colleen Quinton	Cadavres	
2010; 12th Jutra Awards	Djina Caron	The Master Key (Grande Ourse, la clé des possibles)	
2010; 12th Jutra Awards	Bruno Gatien, Sophie Lebeau, Mélanie Rodrigue	Martyrs	
2010; 12th Jutra Awards	Joan-Patricia Parris	5150 Elm's Way (5150, rue des Ormes)	
2010; 12th Jutra Awards	Fanny Vachon	The Timekeeper (L'Heure de vérité)	
2011; 13th Jutra Awards
2011; 13th Jutra Awards	Adrien Morot	Barney's Version	
2011; 13th Jutra Awards	Marlène Rouleau, C. J. Goldman	7 Days (Les 7 Jours du Talion)	
2011; 13th Jutra Awards	Joan-Patricia Parris	Vital Signs (Les signes vitaux)	
2011; 13th Jutra Awards	Micheline Trépanier	Oscar and the Lady in Pink (Oscar et la dame rose)	
2011; 13th Jutra Awards	Mélanie Turcotte, Mario Soucy	Twice a Woman (2 fois une femme)	
2012; 14th Jutra Awards
2012; 14th Jutra Awards	Julie Casault	Gerry	
2012; 14th Jutra Awards	Kathryn Casault	Trash (Décharge)	
2012; 14th Jutra Awards	Christiane Fattori, Frédéric Marin	Café de Flore	
2012; 14th Jutra Awards	Kathy Kelso, Nathalie Trépanier, Micheline Trépanier	Funkytown	
2012; 14th Jutra Awards	Diane Simard	A Life Begins (Une vie qui commence)	
2013; 15th Jutra Awards
2013; 15th Jutra Awards	Kathy Kelso, Colleen Quinton	Laurence Anyways	
2013; 15th Jutra Awards	Kathryn Casault	Ésimésac	
2013; 15th Jutra Awards	Kathryn Casault	The Bossé Empire (L'Empire Bossé)	
2013; 15th Jutra Awards	Pascale Jones	The Girl in the White Coat	
2013; 15th Jutra Awards	Marlène Rouleau	L'Affaire Dumont	
2014; 16th Jutra Awards
2014; 16th Jutra Awards	Natalie Trépanier	Louis Cyr	
2014; 16th Jutra Awards	Kathryn Casault	The Four Soldiers (Les Quatre Soldats)	
2014; 16th Jutra Awards	Kathryn Casault	Whitewash	
2014; 16th Jutra Awards	Maïna Militza	Hunting the Northern Godard (La Chasse au Godard d'Abbittibbi)	
2014; 16th Jutra Awards	Colleen Quinton	Erased	
2015; 17th Jutra Awards
2015; 17th Jutra Awards	Lizane Lasalle	Henri Henri	
2015; 17th Jutra Awards	Brigitte Bilodeau	Maïna	
2015; 17th Jutra Awards	Kathryn Casault, Annick Legout	Tom at the Farm (Tom à la ferme)	
2015; 17th Jutra Awards	Danielle Huard	La Garde	
2015; 17th Jutra Awards	Colleen Quinton	Meetings with a Young Poet	
2016; 18th Quebec Cinema Awards
2016; 18th Quebec Cinema Awards	Olivier Xavier	Turbo Kid	
2016; 18th Quebec Cinema Awards	Catherine Beaudoin	Anna	
2016; 18th Quebec Cinema Awards	Nicole Lapierre	Elephant Song	
2016; 18th Quebec Cinema Awards	Lizane Lasalle	Corbo	
2016; 18th Quebec Cinema Awards	Joan-Patricia Parris, Mario Soucy	Death Dive (Le Scaphandrier)	
2017; 19th Quebec Cinema Awards
2017; 19th Quebec Cinema Awards	Djina Caron	Nelly	
2017; 19th Quebec Cinema Awards	Claire De Ernst	Kiss Me Like a Lover (Embrasse-moi comme tu m'aimes)	
2017; 19th Quebec Cinema Awards	Nicole Lapierre	Wild Run: The Legend (Chasse-Galerie: La Légende)	
2017; 19th Quebec Cinema Awards	Maïna Militza	It's Only the End of the World (Juste la fin du monde)	
2017; 19th Quebec Cinema Awards	Marlène Rouleau	Nitro Rush	
2018; 20th Quebec Cinema Awards
2018; 20th Quebec Cinema Awards	Erik Gosselin, Marie-France Guy	Ravenous (Les Affamés)	
2018; 20th Quebec Cinema Awards	Kathryn Casault	Hochelaga, Land of Souls (Hochelaga, terre des âmes)	
2018; 20th Quebec Cinema Awards	Kathryn Casault, Stéphane Tessier	Infiltration (Le problème d'infiltration)	
2018; 20th Quebec Cinema Awards	Bruno Gatien	All You Can Eat Buddha	
2018; 20th Quebec Cinema Awards	Marlène Rouleau	We Are the Others (Nous sommes les autres)	
2019; 21st Quebec Cinema Awards
2019; 21st Quebec Cinema Awards	Nicole Lapierre	La Bolduc	
2019; 21st Quebec Cinema Awards	Audrey Bitton	For Those Who Don't Read Me (À tous ceux qui ne me lisent pas)	
2019; 21st Quebec Cinema Awards	Virginie Boudreau	1991	
2019; 21st Quebec Cinema Awards	Dominique T. Hasbani	Genesis (Genèse)	
2019; 21st Quebec Cinema Awards	Dominique T. Hasbani	Ghost Town Anthology (Répertoire des villes disparues)	
2019; 21st Quebec Cinema Awards	Léonie Lévesque-Robert	A Colony (Une colonie)	

== 2020s ==
Year	Winners and nominees	Film	Ref
2020; 22nd Quebec Cinema Awards
2020; 22nd Quebec Cinema Awards	Adriana Verbert	The Twentieth Century	
2020; 22nd Quebec Cinema Awards	Erik Gosselin, Edwina Voda	Matthias & Maxime	
2020; 22nd Quebec Cinema Awards	Jeanne Lafond	Jouliks	
2020; 22nd Quebec Cinema Awards	Léonie Lévesque-Robert	Fabulous (Fabuleuses)	
2020; 22nd Quebec Cinema Awards	Marlène Rouleau, Bruno Gatien	Mafia Inc.	
2021; 23rd Quebec Cinema Awards
2021; 23rd Quebec Cinema Awards	Joan-Patricia Parris, Nancy Ferlatte, Erik Gosselin	Blood Quantum	
2021; 23rd Quebec Cinema Awards	Audray Adam, Sandra Ruel	Underground (Souterrain)	
2021; 23rd Quebec Cinema Awards	Kathryn Casault	Goddess of the Fireflies (La déesse des mouches à feu)	
2021; 23rd Quebec Cinema Awards	Larysa Chernienko, Natalie Trépanier	Target Number One	
2021; 23rd Quebec Cinema Awards	Dominique T. Hasbani	The Decline (Jusqu'au déclin)	
2022; 24th Quebec Cinema Awards
2022; 24th Quebec Cinema Awards	Adriana Verbert, Bruno Gatien	The Time Thief (L'arracheuse de temps)	
2022; 24th Quebec Cinema Awards	Djina Caron	Maria Chapdelaine	
2022; 24th Quebec Cinema Awards	Marie-Josée Galibert	Drunken Birds (Les oiseaux ivres)	
2022; 24th Quebec Cinema Awards	Erik Gosselin, Edwina Voda	Brain Freeze	
2022; 24th Quebec Cinema Awards	Kathy Kelso, Marie Lastennet, Sarah Mescoff	Aline	
2023; 25th Quebec Cinema Awards
2023; 25th Quebec Cinema Awards	Lyne Tremblay, Faustina De Sousa, François Gauthier, Michael Loncin	Farador	
2023; 25th Quebec Cinema Awards	Kathryn Casault, Bruno Gatien	Confessions of a Hitman (Confessions)	
2023; 25th Quebec Cinema Awards	Marie-Josée Galibert	Viking	
2023; 25th Quebec Cinema Awards	Marie Salvado	Red Rooms (Les Chambres rouges)	
2023; 25th Quebec Cinema Awards	Adriana Verbert	Babysitter	
2024; 26th Quebec Cinema Awards
2024; 26th Quebec Cinema Awards	Marie Salvado	Solo	
2024; 26th Quebec Cinema Awards	Catherine Brunelle, Bruno Gatien, Rémy Couture, Vicky Limkalan	We Are Zombies	
2024; 26th Quebec Cinema Awards	Tania Guarnaccia	Humanist Vampire Seeking Consenting Suicidal Person (Vampire humaniste cherche suicidaire consentant)	
2024; 26th Quebec Cinema Awards	Dominique T. Hasbani	Ru	
2024; 26th Quebec Cinema Awards	Catherine Lavoie	Sisters and Neighbors! (Nos belles-sœurs)	
2025; 27th Quebec Cinema Awards
2025; 27th Quebec Cinema Awards	Léonie Lévesque-Robert, Bruno Gatien, Stefan Ashdown, Caroline Aquin	Vile & Miserable (Vil & Misérable)	
2025; 27th Quebec Cinema Awards	Djina Caron	Two Women (Deux femmes en or)	
2025; 27th Quebec Cinema Awards	Jeanne Lafond	Compulsive Liar 2 (Menteuse)	
2025; 27th Quebec Cinema Awards	Marie Salvado	Peak Everything (Amour apocalypse)	
2025; 27th Quebec Cinema Awards	Marie Salvado	Universal Language (Une langue universelle)	

== Multiple wins and nominations ==
=== Multiple wins ===
Wins	Makeup artist
2	Marie-Angèle Breitner
2	Bruno Gatien
2	Erik Gosselin
2	Colleen Quinton
2	Adriana Verbert

=== Three or more nominations ===
Nominations	Makeup artist
15	Kathryn Casault
7	Bruno Gatien
6	Marlène Rouleau
5	Diane Simard
4	Claudette Beaudoin-Casavant
4	Marie-Angèle Breitner
4	Djina Caron
4	Erik Gosselin
4	Dominique T. Hasbani
4	Nicole Lapierre
4	Joan-Patricia Parris
4	Colleen Quinton
4	Marie Salvado
3	Kathy Kelso
3	Léonie Lévesque-Robert
3	Micheline Trépanier
3	Natalie Trépanier
3	Adriana Verbert

== See also ==
- Canadian Screen Award for Best Makeup
