= Crimes of the Future (2022 film) =

2022 film by David Cronenberg

- Theatrical release poster
- Directed by: David Cronenberg
- Written by: David Cronenberg
- Produced by: Panos Papahadzis; Steve Solomos; Robert Lantos
- Starring: Viggo Mortensen; Léa Seydoux; Kristen Stewart; Scott Speedman
- Cinematography: Douglas Koch
- Edited by: Christopher Donaldson
- Music by: Howard Shore
- Production companies: Serendipity Point Films; Telefilm Canada; Ingenious Media; Argonauts Productions; Crave; CBC Films; ERT; Rocket Science
- Distributed by: Serendipity Point Films (Canada); Metropolitan Filmexport (France); Vertigo Films (United Kingdom); Argonauts Distribution (Greece); NEON (United States)
- Release dates: May 23, 2022 (Cannes); May 25, 2022 (France); June 3, 2022 (Canada); September 9, 2022 (United Kingdom)
- Running time: 107 minutes
- Countries: Canada; Greece; United Kingdom
- Language: English
- Budget: $27 million
- Box office: $4.6 million

Crimes of the Future is a 2022 science fiction body horror drama film written and directed by David Cronenberg. The film stars Viggo Mortensen, Léa Seydoux and Kristen Stewart. It follows a performance artist duo (Mortensen and Seydoux) who perform surgery for audiences in a future where human evolution has accelerated for much of the population. Although the film shares its title with Cronenberg's 1970 film of the same name, it is not a remake, as the story and concept are unrelated. The film marked Cronenberg's return to the science fiction and horror genres for the first time since Existenz (1999).

An international co-production of Canadian, French, British, and Greek companies, Crimes of the Future had its world premiere at the 2022 Cannes Film Festival, where it competed for the Palme d'Or and received a six-minute standing ovation. The film received a theatrical release in France on May 25, 2022, opened in Canada on June 3, 2022, and had a same day limited release in the United States. It received generally positive reviews from critics but performed poorly at the box office.

== Plot ==
In an unspecified future, significant advances in biotechnology have led to the widespread adoption of machines and analogue computers that can directly interface with and control bodily functions. Humankind itself has experienced several biological changes of indeterminate origin. Most significant among these changes is the disappearance of physical pain and infectious disease for an overwhelming majority, allowing surgeries to be performed on conscious people in ordinary settings. Other humans experience even more radical alterations to their physiology. An eight-year-old boy named Brecken can consume and digest plastics as food. Convinced he is inhuman, Brecken's mother smothers him with a pillow, leaving his corpse to be found by her ex-husband Lang.

Saul Tenser and Caprice are a world-renowned performance artist couple. Taking advantage of Tenser's "accelerated evolution syndrome," a disorder that causes his body to spontaneously grow new organs, they surgically remove the organs before a live audience. The syndrome leaves Tenser in constant pain and with severe respiratory and digestive discomfort. He is dependent on several specialized biomechanical devices: a bed, a machine through which Caprice performs surgery on him, and a chair that twitches and rotates as it assists him with eating.

The couple meet with bureaucrats from the National Organ Registry, a governmental office upholding the state's restrictions on human evolution by cataloging and storing newly evolved organs. One of the bureaucrats, the nervy Timlin, becomes captivated by Tenser's artistic goals. At a successful show of Tenser's, she tells him that "surgery is the new sex," a sentiment that Tenser and many other characters appear to embrace as repetitive cutting seems to be the preferred means of sexual gratification.

A governmental police unit seeks to use Tenser to infiltrate a group of radical evolutionists. Without telling Caprice, he follows a series of contacts through other biological performance art shows that lead him to the evolutionist cell. One of them, former cosmetic surgeon Nasatir, creates a zippered cavern in Tenser's stomach, which Caprice uses to access Tenser's organs in an oral sex act where she fellates his zipper wound and presumably his internal organs while he moans in erotic pleasure. Caprice continues to network with other performance artists, eventually choosing to receive decorative cosmetic surgery on her forehead.

Tenser meets with Lang, who reveals to him the agenda of the evolutionists: they have chosen to modify their digestive system to make them able to eat plastics and other synthetic chemicals. Their principal food is a bar of toxic waste, fatally poisonous to others. Lang is the cell's leader; his son Brecken had been born with the ability to eat plastic, proving the inaccuracy of the government's critical stance on human evolution. Timlin tries to initiate sex with Tenser, but he declines, saying "I'm not very good at the old sex."

Lang eventually approaches Tenser, wanting the couple to reveal the cell's anti-government agenda through a public autopsy of Brecken that will highlight his evolved digestive system. After some deliberation, Tenser agrees. With Timlin, Lang and many others watching, Tenser performs the autopsy, but it is revealed that Brecken's natural organ system has been surgically replaced. Lang flees the show in tears. Outside, he is approached by two agents who supposedly work for the corporation that manufactures Tenser's biomedical machines. Mimicking their earlier killing of Nasatir, they assassinate Lang by driving power drills into his head. Tenser's connection within the police unit admits that Timlin replaced Brecken's organs to keep the deviation in human evolution secret from the public. Saddened by Brecken and Lang's deaths, Tenser informs the police that he will no longer serve them, approvingly mentioning the cell's beliefs on evolution.

Tenser struggles to eat in his chair. He asks Caprice to give him a bar of plastic. As Caprice records him, he eats it, looks into Caprice's camera, and sheds a tear. His mouth twitches into a smile as the chair finally quiets.

== Cast ==
- Viggo Mortensen as Saul Tenser, a man who grows new organs inside of his body as part of "Accelerated Evolution Syndrome"
- Léa Seydoux as Caprice, Tenser's partner who can observe and tattoo his organs in his personal operating theatre
- Kristen Stewart as Timlin, an investigator with the National Organ Registry who takes a particular interest in Tenser
- Scott Speedman as Lang Dotrice
- Welket Bungué as Detective Cope
- Don McKellar as Wippet, an investigator with the National Organ Registry
- Yorgos Pirpassopoulos as Dr. Nasatir
- Tanaya Beatty as Berst
- Nadia Litz as Dani Router
- Lihi Kornowski as Djuna Dotrice
- Denise Capezza as Odile
- Sozos Sotiris as Brecken Dotrice
- Tassos Karahalios as Klinek
- Ephie Kantza as Adrienne Berceau
- Jason Bitter as Tarr
- Penelope Tsilika as Beauty spa woman

== Production ==
Director David Cronenberg first wrote the script in 1998. The film was a thriller set to begin production in early 2003 under the title Painkillers, which explored the world of performance art and took place in an anesthetized society where pain is the new forbidden pleasure, and surgery and self-mutilation, being performed in public and on camera, have come to be regarded as the new sex. Ralph Fiennes was attached to star as Saul Tenser after Nicolas Cage, the first option for the main role, dropped out. It was intended to be shot in Toronto, Canada, on a budget of $35 million. ThinkFilm had picked up worldwide rights, with a scheduled release for late 2006 in North America. However, the project never entered production. In a mid-2000s interview, Cronenberg brushed the project aside, stating that it was not happening and that he had lost interest in making it anyway. When he picked the project back up years later, he "didn't change a word" of the script since first writing it in 1998.

In February 2021, during an interview with GQ magazine, Viggo Mortensen revealed that he was working on a project with Cronenberg, saying: "Yes, we do have something in mind. It's something he wrote a long time ago, and he never got it made. Now he's refined it, and he wants to shoot it. Hopefully, it'll be this summer we'll be filming. I would say, without giving the story away, he's going maybe a little bit back to his origins". In April, Léa Seydoux and Kristen Stewart were among the cast announced for the film. Natalie Portman was initially supposed to play Seydoux's part (who initially was set to play Stewart's role), but she was unable to do the film because of conflicts related to COVID-19. In August 2021, Tanaya Beatty, Yorgos Karamihos, Nadia Litz and Yorgos Pirpassopoulos joined the cast of the film.

Principal photography began on August 2, 2021, and concluded on September 10, 2021, in Athens, Greece.

== Reception ==
=== Box office ===
Crimes of the Future grossed $2.4 million in the United States and Canada, and $2 million in other territories, for a total worldwide gross of $4.5 million.

In the United States and Canada, the film earned $1.1 million from 773 theaters in its opening weekend, finishing tenth at the box office. It dropped out of the box office top ten in its second weekend with $374,131.

=== Home media ===
Crimes of the Future was released on 4K Ultra HD Blu-ray on January 31, 2023, from Decal Releasing, Neon, and Distribution Solutions as well as from Second Sight in the UK.

=== Critical response ===
On the review aggregator website Rotten Tomatoes, the film holds an approval rating of 80% based on 285 reviews, and an average rating of 6.7/10. The website's critics consensus reads, "Quintessential if not classic Cronenberg, Crimes of the Future finds the director revisiting familiar themes with typically unsettling flair". On Metacritic, the film has a weighted average score of 68 out of 100, based on 55 reviews, indicating "generally favorable reviews".

David Rooney of The Hollywood Reporter praised the performances of Mortensen and Seydoux but concluded that the film "offers up more mysteries than it solves." Todd McCarthy's review in Deadline Hollywood describes the film as "serious, elegant and provocative enough to cut it as an art film in the Cannes competition while also delivering the gross goods of body parts and exploitation film provocations. Not too many filmmakers can straddle the two, but Cronenberg still manages it pretty well."

The film was named to the Toronto International Film Festival's annual year-end Canada's Top Ten list for 2022.

== Accolades ==
Award	Date of ceremony	Category	Nominee(s)	Result	Ref.
Saturn Awards	October 25, 2022	Best Science Fiction Film	Crimes of the Future	Nominated	
Saturn Awards	October 25, 2022	Best Music	Howard Shore	Nominated	
Saturn Awards	October 25, 2022	Best Make-Up	Alexandra Anger, Monica Pavez, and Evi Zafiropoulou	Nominated	
Directors Guild of Canada	November 5, 2022	Best Direction in a Feature Film	David Cronenberg	Won	
Florida Film Critics Circle	December 22, 2022	Best Art Direction / Production Design	Crimes of the Future	Runner-up	
Toronto Film Critics Association	March 6, 2023	Rogers Best Canadian Film Award	Crimes of the Future	Nominated	
Canadian Screen Awards	April 16, 2023	Best Director	David Cronenberg	Nominated	
Canadian Screen Awards	April 16, 2023	Best Art Direction/Production Design	Carol Spier	Nominated	
Canadian Screen Awards	April 16, 2023	Best Cinematography	Douglas Koch	Nominated	
Canadian Screen Awards	April 16, 2023	Best Costume Design	Mayou Trikerioti	Nominated	
Canadian Screen Awards	April 16, 2023	Best Editing	Christopher Donaldson	Nominated	
Canadian Screen Awards	April 16, 2023	Best Sound Editing	Robert Bertola, Tom Bjelic, Jill Purdy	Nominated	
Canadian Screen Awards	April 16, 2023	Best Sound Mixing	Ron Mellegers, Justin Helle, Christian Cooke, Mark Zsifkovits	Nominated	
Canadian Screen Awards	April 16, 2023	Best Original Score	Howard Shore	Nominated	
Canadian Screen Awards	April 16, 2023	Best Makeup	Alexandra Anger, Monica Pavez	Won	
Canadian Screen Awards	April 16, 2023	Best Visual Effects	Peter MacAuley, Kayden Anderson, Tom Turnbull, Caitlin Foster	Won	
Canadian Screen Awards	April 16, 2023	Best Casting	Deirdre Bowen	Nominated	
Golden Trailer Awards	June 29, 2023	Best Original Score TV Spot (for a Feature Film)	"Pain" (GrandSon Creative)	Won	
