= Pierre Saindon =

Canadian make-up artist and educator

Pierre Saindon is a Canadian make-up artist and educator. He is a two-time winner of the Genie Award for Best Makeup, at the 11th Genie Awards in 1990 for Cruising Bar and at the 18th Genie Awards in 1997 for Karmina.

He later retired from the film industry to teach makeup art at the secondary school level.
