= Nancy Ferlatte =

Canadian make-up artist

Nancy Ferlatte is a Canadian make-up artist. She is most noted for her work on the 2020 film Blood Quantum, for which she won the Canadian Screen Award for Best Makeup at the 9th Canadian Screen Awards and the Prix Iris for Best Makeup at the 22nd (B) Quebec Cinema Awards in 2021.
