= Nicole Lapierre =

French writer

- In a 2023 interview
- Born: Nicole Colombe Lipsztejn; 1947 (age 78–79); Paris, France
- Occupations: Sociologist, anthropologist, writer
- Employer: CNRS

Nicole Lapierre (née Lipsztejn; born 1947) is a French sociologist, anthropologist and writer. She is the emeritus director of research at CNRS. She published her first book, La Femme majeure, in 1973, in collaboration with Edgar Morin and Bernard Paillard. Her later books include Le Silence de la mémoire (1989), Changer de nom (1995), La famille providence (1997), Le Nouvel Esprit de famille (2001), Pensons ailleurs (2004) and Causes communes (2011). She is a winner of the Prix Medicis.

== Biography ==
Nicole Colombe Lipsztejn was born in Paris in 1947. When she was in high school, her father changed the family's name to Lapierre to "protect the children".
