= Erik Gosselin =

Canadian make-up artist and special effects technician

Erik Gosselin is a Canadian make-up artist and special effects technician. He is most noted for his work on the 2017 film Ravenous (Les Affamés), for which he won both the Canadian Screen Award for Best Makeup at the 6th Canadian Screen Awards and the Prix Iris for Best Makeup at the 20th Quebec Cinema Awards in 2018, and the 2020 film Blood Quantum, for which he won both of the same awards at the 9th Canadian Screen Awards and the 22nd (B) Quebec Cinema Awards in 2021.

He was also a Prix Iris nominee for Matthias & Maxime at the 22nd (A) Quebec Cinema Awards in 2020, and a Canadian Screen Award winner for Best Makeup in Television for his work on Being Human.
