= Joan-Patricia Parris =

Canadian make-up artist

Joan-Patricia Parris, sometimes credited as Jo Pat Parris, is a Canadian make-up artist. She is most noted for her work on the 2020 film Blood Quantum, for which she won the Canadian Screen Award for Best Makeup at the 9th Canadian Screen Awards and the Prix Iris for Best Makeup at the 22nd (B) Quebec Cinema Awards in 2021.

She was also previously a Jutra/Iris nominee for 5150 Elm's Way (5150, rue des ormes) at the 12th Jutra Awards in 2010, for Vital Signs (Les signes vitaux) at the 13th Jutra Awards in 2011, and for Death Dive (Le Scaphandrier) at the 18th Quebec Cinema Awards in 2016.
