= Kathryn Casault =

Canadian make-up artist

Kathryn Casault is a Canadian make-up artist. She is most noted for her work on the film Babine, for which she won the Jutra Award for Best Makeup at the 11th Jutra Awards in 2009.

She has also been a Jutra/Iris nominee for 13 other films, and a three-time Genie Award and Canadian Screen Award nominee for Best Makeup.

== Awards ==
Award	Ceremony	Work	Result	Ref(s)
Prix Iris for Best Makeup	6th Jutra Awards	8:17 p.m. Darling Street (20h17 rue Darling)	Nominated	
Prix Iris for Best Makeup	7th Jutra Awards	Battle of the Brave (Nouvelle-France)	Nominated	
Prix Iris for Best Makeup	8th Jutra Awards	Audition (L'Audition)	Nominated	
Prix Iris for Best Makeup	10th Jutra Awards	My Aunt Aline (Ma tante Aline)	Nominated	
Prix Iris for Best Makeup	11th Jutra Awards	Babine	Won	
Prix Iris for Best Makeup	14th Jutra Awards	Trash (Décharge)	Nominated	
Prix Iris for Best Makeup	15th Jutra Awards	The Bossé Empire (L'Empire Bossé)	Nominated	
Prix Iris for Best Makeup	15th Jutra Awards	Ésimésac	Nominated	
Prix Iris for Best Makeup	16th Jutra Awards	The Four Soldiers (Les Quatre Soldats)	Nominated	
Prix Iris for Best Makeup	16th Jutra Awards	Whitewash	Nominated	
Prix Iris for Best Makeup	17th Jutra Awards	Tom at the Farm (Tom à la ferme)	Nominated	
Prix Iris for Best Makeup	20th Quebec Cinema Awards	Hochelaga, Land of Souls (Hochelaga, terre des âmes)	Nominated	
Prix Iris for Best Makeup	20th Quebec Cinema Awards	Infiltration (Le problème d'infiltration)	Nominated	
Prix Iris for Best Makeup	23rd Quebec Cinema Awards	Goddess of the Fireflies (La déesse des mouches à feu)	Nominated	
Canadian Screen Award for Best Makeup	31st Genie Awards	Incendies	Nominated	
Canadian Screen Award for Best Makeup	5th Canadian Screen Awards	Two Lovers and a Bear	Nominated	
Canadian Screen Award for Best Makeup	6th Canadian Screen Awards	Hochelaga, Land of Souls (Hochelaga terre des âmes)	Nominated	
