= 4th Saturn Awards =

US film and television awards ceremony

- Date: January 15, 1977
- Site: California, U.S.

Highlights
- Most awards: Logan's Run (6)

The 4th Saturn Awards were awarded to media properties and personalities deemed by the Academy of Science Fiction, Fantasy and Horror Films to be the best in science fiction, fantasy and horror released in the year 1976. They were awarded on January 15, 1977.

The following ceremony would include actual nominees in the categories and discontinue single juried winners onward; although, there would still be honorary/special awards given to individuals annually, such as the George Pal Memorial Award and Life Career Award.

Below is a complete list of nominees and winners. Winners are highlighted in bold.

== Winners and nominees ==
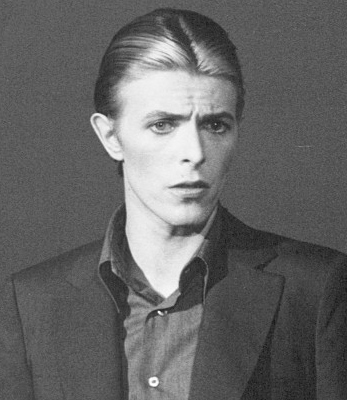
David Bowie, Best Actor winner

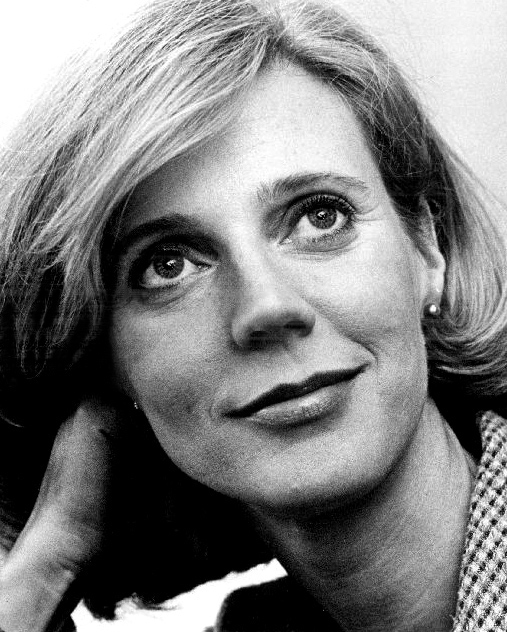
Blythe Danner, Best Actress winner

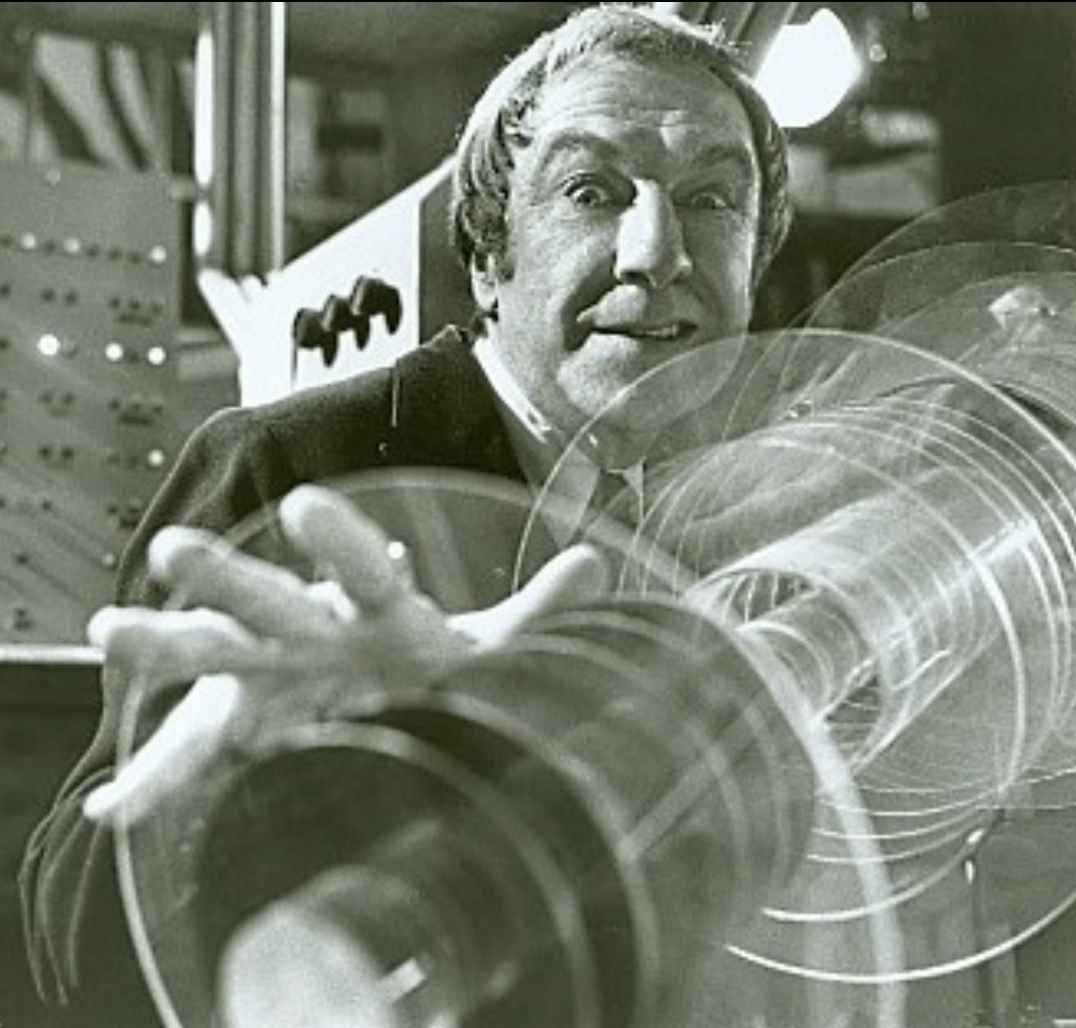
Jay Robinson, Best Supporting Actor winner

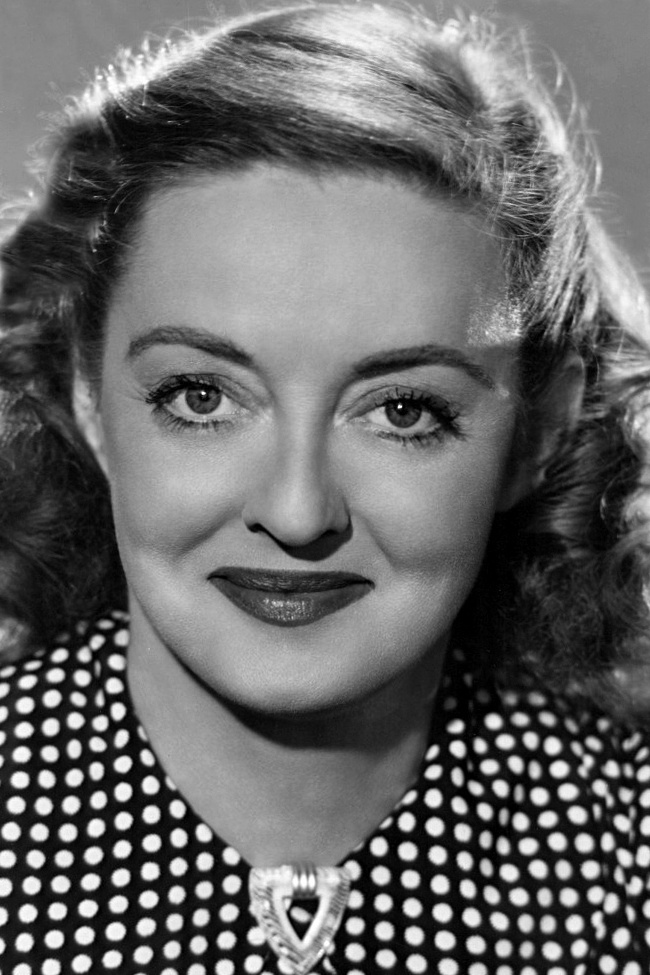
Bette Davis, Best Supporting Actress winner

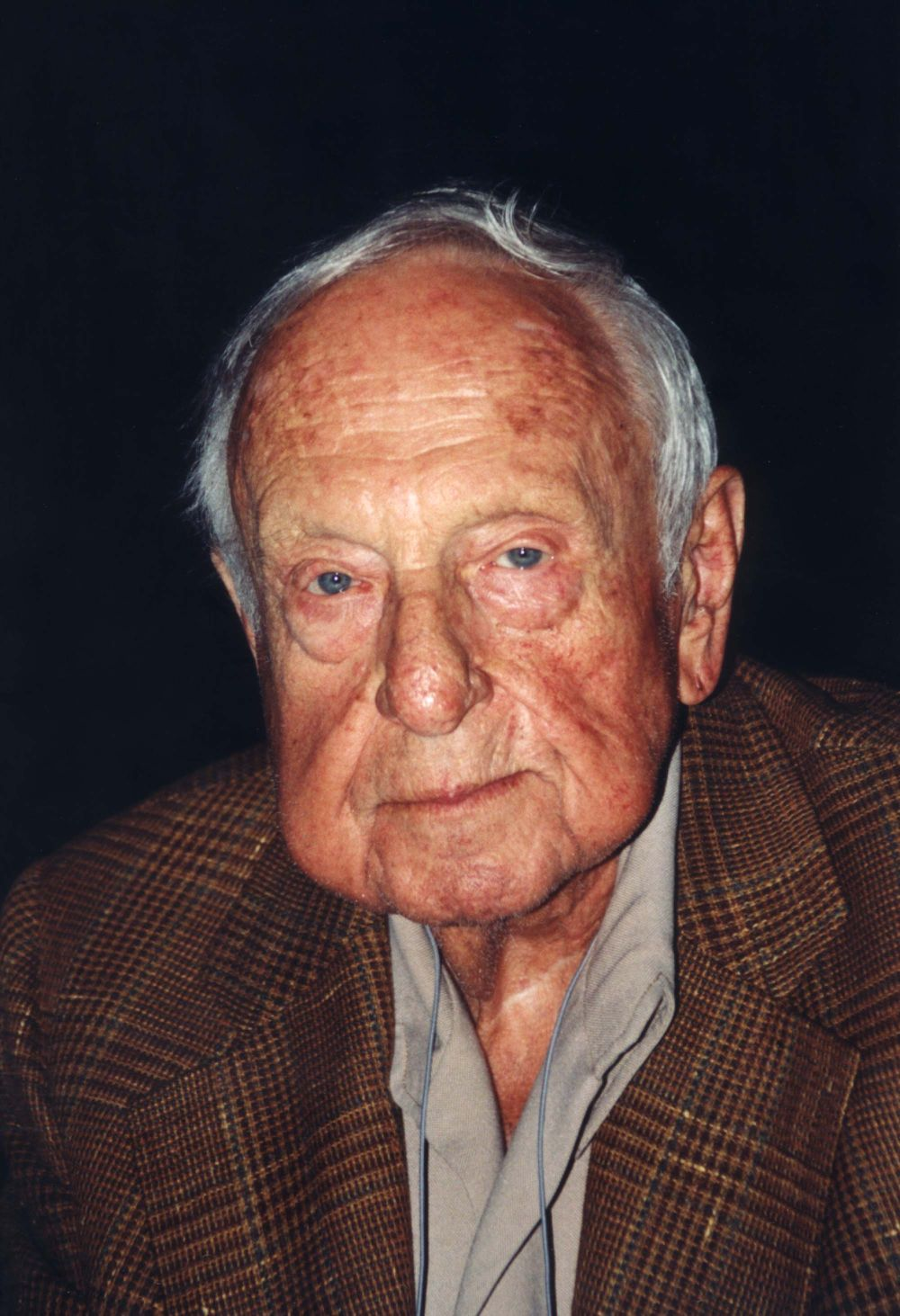
Samuel Z. Arkoff, Life Career Award winner

| Best Science Fiction Film | Best Fantasy Film |
|---|---|
| **Logan's Run**; Embryo; Futureworld; God Told Me To; The Man Who Fell to Earth; Network; Solaris | **The Down-in-the-Hole Gang**; At the Earth's Core; The Blue Bird; Bugsy Malone; The Seven-Per-Cent Solution |
| Best Horror Film | Best Animator |
| **Burnt Offerings**; Carrie; Eaten Alive; The Food of the Gods; House of Mortal Sin; Obsession; The Omen | **Chuck Jones** (for his career) |
| Best Director | Best Writing |
| **Dan Curtis – Burnt Offerings** | **Jimmy Sangster** (for his career) |
| Best Actor | Best Actress |
| **David Bowie – The Man Who Fell to Earth as Thomas Jerome Newton** | **Blythe Danner – Futureworld as Tracy "Socks" Ballard** |
| Best Supporting Actor | Best Supporting Actress |
| **Jay Robinson – Train Ride to Hollywood as Dracula** | **Bette Davis – Burnt Offerings as Aunt Elizabeth** |
| Best Art Direction | Best Cinematography |
| **Dale Hennesy – Logan's Run** | **Ernest Laszlo – Logan's Run** |
| Best Costumes | Best Make-up |
| **Bill Thomas – Logan's Run** | **William J. Tuttle – Logan's Run** |
| Best Music | Best Publicist |
| **David Raksin** (for his career) | **Don Morgan** |
| Best Set Decoration | Best Special Effects |
| **Robert De Vestel – Logan's Run** | **L. B. Abbott** (for his career) |
Honorary awards
| Executive Achievement Award | Life Career Award |
| **Gene Roddenberry** | **Samuel Z. Arkoff** |
Special Award
**King Kong**
