= List of awards and nominations received by Steven Spielberg =

Steven Spielberg awards and nominations
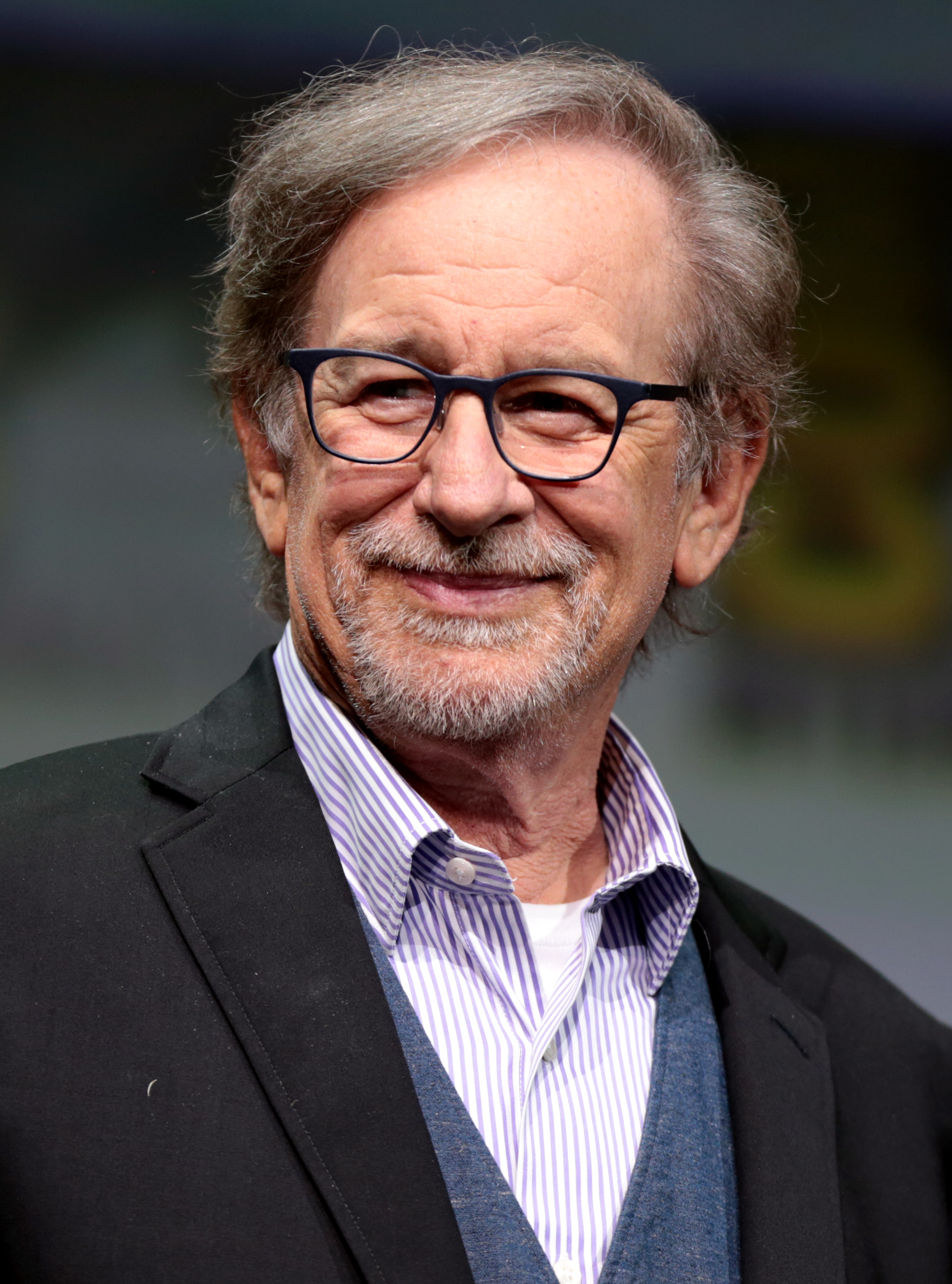
- Spielberg at 2017 San Diego Comic-Con for Ready Player One
Awards and nominations
Award	Wins	Nominations
Academy Awards	3	24
British Academy Film Awards	4	15
Daytime Emmy Awards	7	15
Golden Globe Awards	5	20
Grammy Awards	1	1
News and Documentary Emmy Awards	0	1
Primetime Emmy Awards	4	11
Sports Emmy Awards	2	2
Tony Awards	1	3

Totals (Note: Certain award groups do not simply award one winner. They acknowledge several different recipients, have runners-up, and have third place. Since this is a specific recognition and is different from losing an award, runner-up mentions are considered wins in this award tally. For simplification and to avoid errors, each award in this list has been presumed to have had a prior nomination.)
- Wins: 157
- Nominations: 321

The following is a list of awards and nominations received by Steven Spielberg.

Steven Spielberg is an American filmmaker. He began his career in the New Hollywood era and is currently the most commercially successful director. Spielberg is recipient of various awards including three Academy Awards, four BAFTA Awards, thirteen Emmy Awards, five Golden Globe Awards, three Directors Guild of America Awards, seven Producers Guild of America Awards, a Tony Award, and a Grammy Award.

Spielberg has received nine nominations for the Academy Award for Best Director making him the third most-nominated director behind Martin Scorsese (10) and William Wyler (12). Spielberg won this category twice for his Holocaust epic Schindler's List (1993) and the World War II drama Saving Private Ryan (1998). He holds the record for most nominations for the Academy Award for Best Picture with fourteen nominations for the science-fiction drama E.T. the Extra-Terrestrial (1982), the period dramas The Color Purple (1985), Schindler's List (1993)—which he won—and Saving Private Ryan (1998), the war dramas Munich (2005), Letters from Iwo Jima (2006), and War Horse (2011), the historical epics Lincoln (2012), Bridge of Spies (2015), and The Post (2017), the musical West Side Story (2021), the coming-of-age drama The Fabelmans (2022), the biopic Maestro (2023), and the historical tragedy Hamnet (2025).

For his work on television, he won the Primetime Emmy Award for Outstanding Animated Program for A Pinky and the Brain Christmas (1995), and three Primetime Emmy Awards for Outstanding Limited or Anthology Series for the HBO war drama series Band of Brothers (2001), the science-fiction series Taken (2003), and the HBO war drama series The Pacific (2010). He also won seven Daytime Emmy Awards for producing the animated series Tiny Toon Adventures, Animaniacs, Freakazoid!, Pinky and the Brain, and Pinky, Elmyra & the Brain. As a producer for Broadway productions he has received three nominations for the Tony Award for Best Musical. He was awarded in 2022 for producing A Strange Loop, before receiving further nominations for producing both Water for Elephants (2024), and Death Becomes Her (2025). He won the Grammy Award for Best Music Film for Music by John Williams (2026), achieving EGOT status.

Over his career, Spielberg has received various honors and honorary awards including the BAFTA Fellowship in 1986, the Irving G. Thalberg Memorial Award in 1987, a Career Golden Lion in 1993, the AFI Life Achievement Award in 1995, the Honorary César in 1995, the Directors Guild of America's Lifetime Achievement Award in 2000, a Motion Picture star on the Hollywood Walk of Fame in 2003, the Kennedy Center Honors in 2006, and the Cecil B. DeMille Award in 2009, and the Honorary Golden Bear in 2023. He was presented with the Presidential Medal of Freedom from President Barack Obama in 2015 and the National Medal of Arts in 2024 from President Joe Biden. He was made an Honorary Knight Commander of the Order of the British Empire in 2001, and was made both a Knight and Officer of the France's Legion of Honour in 2004 and 2008, respectively.

== Major associations ==
=== Academy Awards ===
Year	Category	Nominated work	Result	Ref.
1978	Best Director	Close Encounters of the Third Kind	Nominated	
1982	Best Director	Raiders of the Lost Ark	Nominated	
1983	Best Picture	E.T. the Extra-Terrestrial	Nominated	
1983	Best Director	E.T. the Extra-Terrestrial	Nominated	
1986	Best Picture	The Color Purple	Nominated	
1994	Best Picture	Schindler's List	Won	
1994	Best Director	Schindler's List	Won	
1999	Best Picture	Saving Private Ryan	Nominated	
1999	Best Director	Saving Private Ryan	Won	
2006	Best Picture	Munich	Nominated	
2006	Best Director	Munich	Nominated	
2007	Best Picture	Letters from Iwo Jima	Nominated	
2012	Best Picture	War Horse	Nominated	
2013	Best Picture	Lincoln	Nominated	
2013	Best Director	Lincoln	Nominated	
2016	Best Picture	Bridge of Spies	Nominated	
2018	Best Picture	The Post	Nominated	
2022	Best Picture	West Side Story	Nominated	
2022	Best Director	West Side Story	Nominated	
2023	Best Picture	The Fabelmans	Nominated	
2023	Best Director	The Fabelmans	Nominated	
2023	Best Original Screenplay (Note: Shared with Tony Kushner)	The Fabelmans	Nominated	
2024	Best Picture	Maestro	Nominated	
2026	Best Picture	Hamnet	Nominated	

=== BAFTA Awards ===
Year	Category	Nominated work	Result	Ref.
British Academy Film Awards
1975	Best Direction	Jaws	Nominated	
1978	Best Direction	Close Encounters of the Third Kind	Nominated	
1978	Best Screenplay	Close Encounters of the Third Kind	Nominated	
1982	Best Film	E.T. the Extra-Terrestrial	Nominated	
1982	Best Direction	E.T. the Extra-Terrestrial	Nominated	
1993	Best Film	Schindler's List	Won	
1993	Best Direction	Schindler's List	Won	
1998	Best Film	Saving Private Ryan	Nominated	
1998	Best Direction	Saving Private Ryan	Nominated	
2011	Best Animated Film	The Adventures of Tintin	Nominated	
2012	Best Film	Lincoln	Nominated	
2015	Best Film	Bridge of Spies	Nominated	
2015	Best Direction	Bridge of Spies	Nominated	
2022	Best Original Screenplay	The Fabelmans	Nominated	
2025	Best Film	Hamnet	Nominated	
2025	Outstanding British Film	Hamnet	Won	
British Academy Games Awards
2009	Best Casual Game	Boom Blox	Won	

=== Critics' Choice Awards ===
Year	Category	Nominated work	Result	Ref.
Critics' Choice Movie Awards
1999	Best Director	Saving Private Ryan	Won	
2003	Best Director	Catch Me If You Can / Minority Report	Won	
2006	Best Director	Munich	Nominated	
2012	Best Director	War Horse	Nominated	
2013	Best Director	Lincoln	Nominated	
2016	Best Director	Bridge of Spies	Nominated	
2018	Best Director	The Post	Nominated	
2022	Best Director	West Side Story	Nominated	
2023	Best Director	The Fabelmans	Nominated	
2023	Best Original Screenplay	The Fabelmans	Nominated	

=== Emmy Awards ===
Year	Category	Nominated work	Result	Ref.
Primetime Emmy Awards
1986	Outstanding Directing in a Drama Series	Amazing Stories (Episode: "The Mission")	Nominated	
1991	Outstanding Animated Program (For Programming One Hour or Less)	Tiny Toon Adventures (Episode: "The Looney Beginning")	Nominated	
1995	Outstanding Animated Program (For Programming One Hour or Less)	Tiny Toons' Night Ghoulery	Nominated	
1996	Outstanding Animated Program (For Programming One Hour or Less)	A Pinky and the Brain Christmas	Won	
2002	Outstanding Non-Fiction Special (Informational)	We Stand Alone Together	Nominated	
2002	Outstanding Miniseries	Band of Brothers	Won	
2003	Outstanding Miniseries	Taken	Won	
2006	Outstanding Miniseries	Into the West	Nominated	
2010	Outstanding Miniseries	The Pacific	Won	
2016	Outstanding Television Movie	All the Way	Nominated	
2021	Outstanding Television Movie	Oslo	Nominated	
Daytime Emmy Awards
1991	Outstanding Animated Program	Tiny Toon Adventures	Won	
1992	Outstanding Animated Program	Tiny Toon Adventures	Nominated	
1993	Outstanding Children's Animated Program	Tiny Toon Adventures	Won	
1994	Outstanding Children's Animated Program	Animaniacs	Nominated	
1995	Outstanding Children's Animated Program	Animaniacs	Nominated	
1996	Outstanding Children's Animated Program	Animaniacs	Won	
1997	Outstanding Children's Animated Program	Animaniacs	Won	
1997	Outstanding Special Class Animated Program	Freakazoid!	Won	
1997	Outstanding Children's Animated Program	Pinky and the Brain	Nominated	
1998	Outstanding Children's Animated Program	Pinky and the Brain	Nominated	
1998	Outstanding Children's Animated Program	Animaniacs	Nominated	
1999	Outstanding Children's Animated Program	Animaniacs	Nominated	
1999	Outstanding Special Class Animated Program	Pinky and the Brain	Won	
1999	Outstanding Children's Animated Program	Pinky, Elmyra & the Brain	Nominated	
2000	Outstanding Children's Animated Program	Pinky, Elmyra & the Brain	Won	
International Emmy Awards
2006	Founders Award		Honored	
Sports Emmy Awards
2025	Outstanding Open/Tease	Games of the XXXIII Olympiad: "Land of Stories"	Won	
2025	The Dick Schaap Outstanding Writing Award – Short Form	Games of the XXXIII Olympiad: "Land of Stories"	Won	
News and Documentary Emmy Awards
2012	Outstanding Historical Programming – Long Form	Rising: Rebuilding Ground Zero	Nominated	

=== Golden Globe Awards ===
Year	Category	Nominated work	Result	Ref.
1976	Best Director – Motion Picture	Jaws	Nominated	
1978	Best Director – Motion Picture	Close Encounters of the Third Kind	Nominated	
1978	Best Screenplay – Motion Picture	Close Encounters of the Third Kind	Nominated	
1982	Best Director – Motion Picture	Raiders of the Lost Ark	Nominated	
1983	Best Director – Motion Picture	E.T. the Extra-Terrestrial	Nominated	
1986	Best Director – Motion Picture	The Color Purple	Nominated	
1994	Best Director – Motion Picture	Schindler's List	Won	
1998	Best Director – Motion Picture	Amistad	Nominated	
1999	Best Director – Motion Picture	Saving Private Ryan	Won	
2002	Best Director – Motion Picture	A.I. Artificial Intelligence	Nominated	
2002	Best Limited or Anthology Series or Television Film	Band of Brothers	Won	
2003	Best Limited or Anthology Series or Television Film	Taken	Nominated	
2006	Best Director – Motion Picture	Munich	Nominated	
2006	Best Limited or Anthology Series or Television Film	Into the West	Nominated	
2011	Best Limited or Anthology Series or Television Film	The Pacific	Nominated	
2012	Best Animated Feature Film	The Adventures of Tintin	Won	
2013	Best Director – Motion Picture	Lincoln	Nominated	
2018	Best Director – Motion Picture	The Post	Nominated	
2022	Best Director – Motion Picture	West Side Story	Nominated	
2023	Best Director – Motion Picture	The Fabelmans	Won	
2023	Best Screenplay – Motion Picture	The Fabelmans	Nominated	

=== Grammy Awards ===
Year	Category	Nominated work	Result	Ref.
2026	Best Music Film	Music by John Williams	Won	

=== Tony Awards ===
Year	Category	Nominated work	Result	Ref.
2022	Best Musical	A Strange Loop	Won	
2024	Best Musical	Water for Elephants	Nominated	
2025	Best Musical	Death Becomes Her	Nominated	

== Guild awards ==
Organizations	Year	Category	Work	Result	Ref.
Directors Guild of America Awards	1975	Outstanding Directorial Achievement in Motion Pictures	Jaws	Nominated	
Directors Guild of America Awards	1977	Outstanding Directorial Achievement in Motion Pictures	Close Encounters of the Third Kind	Nominated	
Directors Guild of America Awards	1981	Outstanding Directorial Achievement in Motion Pictures	Raiders of the Lost Ark	Nominated	
Directors Guild of America Awards	1982	Outstanding Directorial Achievement in Motion Pictures	E.T. the Extra-Terrestrial	Nominated	
Directors Guild of America Awards	1985	Outstanding Directorial Achievement in Motion Pictures	The Color Purple	Won	
Directors Guild of America Awards	1987	Outstanding Directorial Achievement in Motion Pictures	Empire of the Sun	Nominated	
Directors Guild of America Awards	1993	Outstanding Directorial Achievement in Motion Pictures	Schindler's List	Won	
Directors Guild of America Awards	1997	Outstanding Directorial Achievement in Motion Pictures	Amistad	Nominated	
Directors Guild of America Awards	1998	Outstanding Directorial Achievement in Motion Pictures	Saving Private Ryan	Won	
Directors Guild of America Awards	2005	Outstanding Directorial Achievement in Motion Pictures	Munich	Nominated	
Directors Guild of America Awards	2012	Outstanding Directorial Achievement in Motion Pictures	Lincoln	Nominated	
Directors Guild of America Awards	2021	Outstanding Directorial Achievement in Motion Pictures	West Side Story	Nominated	
Directors Guild of America Awards	2022	Outstanding Directorial Achievement in Motion Pictures	The Fabelmans	Nominated	
Producers Guild of America Awards	1993	Outstanding Producer of Theatrical Motion Pictures	Schindler's List	Won	
Producers Guild of America Awards	1997	Outstanding Producer of Theatrical Motion Pictures	Amistad	Nominated	
Producers Guild of America Awards	1997	Vision Award	Amistad	Won	
Producers Guild of America Awards	1998	Outstanding Producer of Theatrical Motion Pictures	Saving Private Ryan	Won	
Producers Guild of America Awards	2000	PGA Hall of Fame – Motion Pictures	E.T. the Extra-Terrestrial	Won	
Producers Guild of America Awards	2001	Outstanding Producer of Long-Form Television	Band of Brothers	Won	
Producers Guild of America Awards	2005	Outstanding Producer of Long-Form Television	Into the West	Nominated	
Producers Guild of America Awards	2010	Outstanding Producer of Long-Form Television	The Pacific	Won	
Producers Guild of America Awards	2011	Outstanding Producer of Theatrical Motion Pictures	War Horse	Nominated	
Producers Guild of America Awards	2011	Best Animated Theatrical Motion Picture	The Adventures of Tintin: The Secret of the Unicorn	Won	
Producers Guild of America Awards	2012	Outstanding Producer of Theatrical Motion Pictures	Lincoln	Nominated	
Producers Guild of America Awards	2015	Outstanding Producer of Theatrical Motion Pictures	Bridge of Spies	Nominated	
Producers Guild of America Awards	2017	Outstanding Producer of Theatrical Motion Pictures	The Post	Nominated	
Producers Guild of America Awards	2021	Outstanding Producer of Theatrical Motion Pictures	West Side Story	Nominated	
Producers Guild of America Awards	2022	Outstanding Producer of Theatrical Motion Pictures	The Fabelmans	Nominated	
Producers Guild of America Awards	2023	Outstanding Producer of Theatrical Motion Pictures	Maestro	Nominated	
Producers Guild of America Awards	2025	Outstanding Producer of Theatrical Motion Pictures	Hamnet	Nominated	
Writers Guild of America Awards	1974	Best Comedy Written Directly for the Screen	The Sugarland Express	Nominated	
Writers Guild of America Awards	1977	Best Drama Written Directly for the Screen	Close Encounters of the Third Kind	Nominated	
Writers Guild of America Awards	2023	Best Original Screenplay	The Fabelmans	Nominated	

== Miscellaneous awards ==
Organizations	Year	Category	Work	Result	Ref.
Golden Plate Award of the American Academy of Achievement	1986	Golden Plate Award of the American Academy of Achievement	—N/a	Won	
Amanda Award	1994	Best Foreign Film	Schindler's List	Won	
Amanda Award	1999	Best Foreign Film	Saving Private Ryan	Nominated	
American Film Institute	2005	AFI Movie of the Year	Munich	Won	
American Film Institute	2006	AFI Movie of the Year	Letters from Iwo Jima	Won	
American Film Institute	2011	AFI Movie of the Year	War Horse	Won	
American Film Institute	2012	AFI Movie of the Year	Lincoln	Won	
American Film Institute	2015	AFI Movie of the Year	Bridge of Spies	Won	
American Film Institute	2017	AFI Movie of the Year	The Post	Won	
American Film Institute	2021	AFI Movie of the Year	West Side Story	Won	
American Film Institute	2022	AFI Movie of the Year	The Fabelmans	Won	
American Movie Awards	1982	Best Director	Raiders of the Lost Ark	Won	
American Cinema Editors	1990	Golden Eddie Filmmaker of the Year Award	—N/a	Won	
American Cinematheque Award	1989	American Cinematheque Award	—N/a	Won	
AACTA International Awards	1994	Best Foreign Film	Schindler's List	Nominated	
AACTA International Awards	2013	Best International Film	Lincoln	Nominated	
AACTA International Awards	2013	Best Direction	Lincoln	Nominated	
AACTA International Awards	2023	Best Direction	The Fabelmans	Nominated	
Avoriaz International Fantastic Film Festival	1973	Grand Prize	Duel	Won	
Berlin International Film Festival	2023	Honorary Golden Bear		Won	
Blue Ribbon Award	1983	Best Foreign Language Film	E.T.: The Extra-Terrestrial	Won	
Blue Ribbon Award	1987	Best Foreign Language Film	The Color Purple	Won	
Blue Ribbon Award	1994	Best Foreign Language Film	Jurassic Park	Won	
Cannes Film Festival	1974	Palme d'Or	The Sugarland Express	Nominated	
Cannes Film Festival	1974	Best Screenplay	The Sugarland Express	Won	
Capri Hollywood International Film Festival	2023	Capri Producer Award (Note: Shared with Bradley Cooper, Martin Scorsese, Fred Berner, Amy Durning and Kristie Macosko Krieger)	Maestro	Won	
César Award	1982	Best Foreign Film	Raiders of the Lost Ark	Nominated	
César Award	1983	Best Foreign Film	E.T. the Extra-Terrestrial	Nominated	
César Award	1995	Best Foreign Film	Schindler's List	Nominated	
César Award	1995	Honorary César		Won	
César Award	1999	Best Foreign Film	Saving Private Ryan	Nominated	
César Award	2003	Best Foreign Film	Minority Report	Nominated	
Cinema for Peace Awards	2018	Most Valuable Film of the Year	The Post	Won	
Christopher Award	1987	Best Picture	Empire of the Sun	Won	
Christopher Award	2002	Television and Cable	Band of Brothers	Won	
Czech Lion Awards	1995	Best Foreign Language Film	Jurassic Park	Won	
Czech Lion Awards	2002	Best Foreign Language Film	Saving Private Ryan	Won	
David di Donatello Awards	1983	Best Foreign Director	E.T. the Extra-Terrestrial	Won	
David di Donatello Awards	1986	Best Foreign Director	Back to the Future	Won	
David di Donatello Awards	1994	Best Foreign Film	Schindler's List	Nominated	
David di Donatello Awards	1998	Best Foreign Film	Amistad	Nominated	
European Film Awards	1998	Screen International Award	Saving Private Ryan	Nominated	
European Film Awards	2002	Screen International Award	Minority Report	Nominated	
Fantasporto	1984	Best Film	Twilight Zone: The Movie	Nominated	
Fotogramas de Plata	1983	Best Foreign Film	E.T. the Extra-Terrestrial	Won	
Golden Eagle Awards	2006	Best Foreign Film	Munich	Nominated	
Hochi Film Awards	1994	Best Foreign Language Film	Schindler's List	Won	
Hugo Award	1972	Best Dramatic Presentation	The Name of the Game: "L.A. 2017"	Nominated	
Hugo Award	1978	Best Dramatic Presentation	Close Encounters of the Third Kind	Nominated	
Hugo Award	1982	Best Dramatic Presentation	Raiders of the Lost Ark	Won	
Hugo Award	1983	Best Dramatic Presentation	E.T. the Extra-Terrestrial	Nominated	
Hugo Award	1990	Best Dramatic Presentation	Indiana Jones and the Last Crusade	Won	
Hugo Award	1994	Best Dramatic Presentation	Jurassic Park	Won	
Hugo Award	2003	Best Dramatic Presentation, Long Form	Minority Report	Nominated	
Italian National Syndicate of Film Journalists	1995	Best Director	Schindler's List	Nominated	
Italian National Syndicate of Film Journalists	1999	Best Foreign Director	Saving Private Ryan	Won	
Italian National Syndicate of Film Journalists	2002	Best Foreign Director	Minority Report	Nominated	
Kinema Junpo Awards	1982	Best Foreign Language Film	Raiders of the Lost Ark	Won	
Kinema Junpo Awards	1983	Best Foreign Language Film	E.T. the Extra-Terrestrial	Won	
Kinema Junpo Awards	1983	Readers' Choice Award	E.T. the Extra-Terrestrial	Won	
Kinema Junpo Awards	1994	Best Foreign Language Film	Schindler's List	Won	
Mainichi Film Concours	1994	Best Foreign Language Film	Jurassic Park	Won	
Mainichi Film Concours	1995	Best Foreign Language Film	Schindler's List	Won	
Mainichi Film Concours	2002	Best Foreign Language Film	A.I. Artificial Intelligence	Won	
Retirement Research Foundation	1990	Television and Theatrical Film Fiction	Dad	Won	
Rembrandt Awards	1998	Best Director	The Lost World: Jurassic Park	Won	
Russian Guild of Film Critics	1998	Best Foreign Film	Saving Private Ryan	Nominated	
Robert Festival	2012	Best American Film	The Adventures of Tintin: The Secret of the Unicorn	Nominated	
Sant Jordi Awards	1983	Mejor Película Infantil	E.T. the Extra-Terrestrial	Won	
Satellite Awards	1998	Best Director	Amistad	Nominated	
Satellite Awards	1998	Best Motion Picture – Drama	Amistad	Nominated	
Satellite Awards	1999	Best Motion Picture – Drama	Saving Private Ryan	Nominated	
Satellite Awards	1999	Best Director	Saving Private Ryan	Nominated	
Satellite Awards	2011	Best Director	War Horse	Nominated	
Satellite Awards	2012	Best Director	Lincoln	Nominated	
Satellite Awards	2015	Best Director	Bridge of Spies	Nominated	
Saturn Awards	1976	Special Awards	Jaws	Won	
Saturn Awards	1978	Best Science Fiction Film	Close Encounters of the Third Kind	Nominated	
Saturn Awards	1978	Best Director (Shared with George Lucas for Star Wars)	Close Encounters of the Third Kind	Won	
Saturn Awards	1978	Best Writing	Close Encounters of the Third Kind	Nominated	
Saturn Awards	1982	Best Fantasy Film	Raiders of the Lost Ark	Won	
Saturn Awards	1982	Best Director	Raiders of the Lost Ark	Won	
Saturn Awards	1983	Best Science Fiction Film	E.T. the Extra-Terrestrial	Won	
Saturn Awards	1983	Best Director	E.T. the Extra-Terrestrial	Nominated	
Saturn Awards	1983	Best Horror Film	Poltergeist	Won	
Saturn Awards	1984	Best Horror Film	Twilight Zone: The Movie	Nominated	
Saturn Awards	1985	Best Fantasy Film	Indiana Jones and the Temple of Doom	Nominated	
Saturn Awards	1985	Best Director	Indiana Jones and the Temple of Doom	Nominated	
Saturn Awards	1991	Best Fantasy Film	Always	Nominated	
Saturn Awards	1991	Best Fantasy Film	Indiana Jones and the Last Crusade	Nominated	
Saturn Awards	1993	Best Fantasy Film	Hook	Nominated	
Saturn Awards	1994	Best Science Fiction Film	Jurassic Park	Won	
Saturn Awards	1994	Best Director	Jurassic Park	Won	
Saturn Awards	1998	Best Fantasy Film	The Lost World: Jurassic Park	Nominated	
Saturn Awards	1998	Best Director	The Lost World: Jurassic Park	Nominated	
Saturn Awards	1999	Best Action/Adventure/Thriller Film	Saving Private Ryan	Won	
Saturn Awards	2002	Best Science Fiction Film	A.I. Artificial Intelligence	Won	
Saturn Awards	2002	Best Director	A.I. Artificial Intelligence	Nominated	
Saturn Awards	2002	Best Screenplay	A.I. Artificial Intelligence	Won	
Saturn Awards	2003	Best Science Fiction Film	Minority Report	Won	
Saturn Awards	2003	Best Director	Minority Report	Won	
Saturn Awards	2006	Best Science Fiction Film	War of the Worlds	Nominated	
Saturn Awards	2006	Best Director	War of the Worlds	Nominated	
Saturn Awards	2007	Best International Film	Letters from Iwo Jima	Nominated	
Saturn Awards	2009	Best Science Fiction Film	Indiana Jones and the Kingdom of the Crystal Skull	Nominated	
Saturn Awards	2009	Best Director	Indiana Jones and the Kingdom of the Crystal Skull	Nominated	
Saturn Awards	2012	Best Director	The Adventures of Tintin	Nominated	
Saturn Awards	2012	Best Animated Film	The Adventures of Tintin	Nominated	
Saturn Awards	2012	Best Science Fiction Film	Super 8	Nominated	
Saturn Awards	2016	Best Thriller Film	Bridge of Spies	Won	
Saturn Awards	2017	Best Fantasy Film	The BFG	Nominated	
Saturn Awards	2017	Best Director	The BFG	Nominated	
Saturn Awards	2018	Best Thriller Film	The Post	Nominated	
Saturn Awards	2019	Best Science Fiction Film	Ready Player One	Won	
Saturn Awards	2019	Best Director	Ready Player One	Nominated	
Saturn Awards	2022	Best Action / Adventure Film	West Side Story	Nominated	
Saturn Awards	2022	Best Director	West Side Story	Nominated	
ShoWest	1982	Director of the Year	—N/a	Won	
ShoWest	1994	Director of the Year	—N/a	Won	
ShoWest	2002	Lifetime Achievement Award		Won	
SFX Awards	2003	Best SF or Fantasy Film Director	Minority Report	Nominated	
Toronto International Film Festival	2022	People's Choice Award	The Fabelmans	Won	
Venice International Film Festival	1993	Golden Lion for Lifetime Achievement		Won	
Venice International Film Festival	2001	Future Film Festival Digital Award	A.I. Artificial Intelligence	Won	
Western Heritage Awards	2006	Outstanding Television Feature Film	Into the West	Won	
Western Heritage Awards	2011	Outstanding Theatrical Motion Picture	True Grit	Nominated	
Young Artist Awards	1994	Jackie Coogan Award	—N/a	Won	

== Critics awards ==
Organizations	Year	Category	Work	Result	Ref.
Boston Society of Film Critics	1982	Best Directing	Raiders of the Lost Ark	Won	
Boston Society of Film Critics	1983	Best Directing	E.T.: The Extra-Terrestrial	Won	
Boston Society of Film Critics	1993	Best Directing	Schindler's List	Won	
Chicago Film Critics Association	1994	Best Director	Schindler's List	Won	
Chicago Film Critics Association	1999	Best Director	Saving Private Ryan	Nominated	
Chicago Film Critics Association	2005	Best Director	Munich	Nominated	
Chicago Film Critics Association	2012	Best Director	Lincoln	Nominated	
Chicago Film Critics Association	2021	Best Director	West Side Story	Nominated	
Chicago Film Critics Association	2022	Best Original Screenplay	The Fabelmans	Nominated	
Dallas-Fort Worth Film Critics Association	1994	Best Director	Schindler's List	Won	
Kansas City Film Critics Circle	1983	Best Director	E.T. the Extra-Terrestrial	Won	
Kansas City Film Critics Circle	1986	Best Director	The Color Purple	Won	
Kansas City Film Critics Circle	1988	Best Director	Empire of the Sun	Won	
Kansas City Film Critics Circle	1994	Best Director	Schindler's List	Won	
Kansas City Film Critics Circle	1999	Best Director	Saving Private Ryan	Won	
Kansas City Film Critics Circle	2006	Best Director	Munich	Won	
Las Vegas Film Critics Society	1998	Best Director	Saving Private Ryan	Won	
London Film Critics Circle	1995	Director of the Year	Schindler's List	Won	
London Film Critics Circle	1999	Director of the Year	Saving Private Ryan	Nominated	
Los Angeles Film Critics Association	1982	Best Director	E.T. the Extra-Terrestrial	Won	
Los Angeles Film Critics Association	1998	Best Director	Saving Private Ryan	Won	
National Board of Review	1987	Best Directing	Empire of the Sun	Won	
National Society of Film Critics	1983	Best Director	E.T. the Extra-Terrestrial	Won	
National Society of Film Critics	1994	Best Director	Schindler's List	Won	
New York Film Critics Circle	1982	Best Director	E.T. the Extra-Terrestrial	Nominated	
New York Film Critics Circle	1993	Best Director	Schindler's List	Nominated	
Online Film Critics Society	1999	Best Director	Saving Private Ryan	Won	
Online Film Critics Society	2002	Best Screenplay	A.I. Artificial Intelligence	Nominated	
Online Film Critics Society	2003	Best Director	Minority Report	Nominated	
Online Film Critics Society	2006	Best Director	Munich	Nominated	
Southeastern Film Critics Association	1999	Best Director	Saving Private Ryan	Won	
Toronto Film Critics Association	1998	Best Director	Saving Private Ryan	Won	
Washington DC Film Critics Association	2005	Best Director	Munich	Won	

== Honors and achievements ==
Organizations	Year	Award	Result	Ref.
British Academy Film Awards	1986	Academy Fellowship	Honored	
Academy of Motion Picture Arts and Sciences	1987	Irving G. Thalberg Memorial Award	Honored	
Boy Scouts of America	1987	Distinguished Eagle Scout Award	Honored	
Venice International Film Festival	1993	Golden Lion for Lifetime Achievement	Honored	
American Society of Cinematographers	1994	Board of the Governors Award	Honored	
Society of Camera Operators	1994	Governors' Award	Honored	
American Film Institute	1995	AFI Life Achievement Award	Honored	
César Awards	1995	Honorary César	Honored	
Federal Republic of Germany	1998	Order of Merit	Honored	
United States Department of Defense	1999	Distinguished Public Service Medal	Honored	
Producers Guild of America	1999	Milestone Award	Honored	
Directors Guild of America	2000	Lifetime Achievement Award	Honored	
Queen Elizabeth II	2001	Knight Commander of the Order of the British Empire (Honorary)	Honored	
National Board of Review	2001	Billy Wilder Award	Honored	
Walk of Fame	2003	Motion Picture Star	Honored	
Italian Republic	2003	Knight Grand Cross Order of Merit	Honored	
French Republic	2004	Knight, Legion of Honour	Honored	
Museum of Pop Culture	2005	Science Fiction Hall of Fame	Honored	(Note: After inducting 36 fantasy and science fiction writers and editors from 1996 to 2004, the Science Fiction and Fantasy Hall of Fame dropped "fantasy" and made non-literary contributors eligible. Alongside one writer, the first three were Spielberg, illustrator Chesley Bonestell, and dynamation animator Ray Harryhausen.)
John F. Kennedy Center for the Performing Arts	2006	Kennedy Center Honors	Honored	
Art Directors Guild	2006	Contribution to Cinematic Imagery Awardn	Honored	
Chicago International Film Festival	2006	Lifetime Achievement Award	Honored	
International Emmy Awards	2006	Founders Award	Honored	
French Republic	2008	Officer, Legion of Honour	Honored	
Hollywood Foreign Press Association	2009	Cecil B. DeMille Award	Honored	
National Constitution Center	2009	Liberty Medal	Honored	
Motion Picture Sound Editors	2010	Film Maker's Award	Honored	
Kingdom of Belgium	2011	Commander, Order of the Crown (Belgium)	Honored	
Producers Guild of America	2012	Lifetime Achievement Award	Honored	
State of Israel	2013	President's Medal	Honored	
President Barack Obama	2015	Presidential Medal of Freedom	Honored	
Berlin International Film Festival	2023	Honorary Golden Bear	Honored	
National Endowment for the Arts	2023	National Medal of Arts	Honored	

== Directed Academy Award performances ==
Year	Performer	Film	Result
Academy Award for Best Actor
1993	Liam Neeson	Schindler's List	Nominated
1998	Tom Hanks	Saving Private Ryan	Nominated
2012	Daniel Day-Lewis	Lincoln	Won
Academy Award for Best Actress
1985	Whoopi Goldberg	The Color Purple	Nominated
2017	Meryl Streep	The Post	Nominated
2022	Michelle Williams	The Fabelmans	Nominated
Academy Award for Best Supporting Actor
1993	Ralph Fiennes	Schindler's List	Nominated
1997	Anthony Hopkins	Amistad	Nominated
2002	Christopher Walken	Catch Me If You Can	Nominated
2012	Tommy Lee Jones	Lincoln	Nominated
2015	Mark Rylance	Bridge of Spies	Won
2022	Judd Hirsch	The Fabelmans	Nominated
Academy Award for Best Supporting Actress
1977	Melinda Dillon	Close Encounters Of The Third Kind	Nominated
1985	Margaret Avery	The Color Purple	Nominated
1985	Oprah Winfrey	The Color Purple	Nominated
2012	Sally Field	Lincoln	Nominated
2021	Ariana DeBose	West Side Story	Won
