= 3rd Saturn Awards =

US film and television awards ceremony

- Date: January 31, 1976
- Site: California, U.S.

Highlights
- Most awards: Young Frankenstein (5)

The 3rd Saturn Awards were awarded to media properties and personalities deemed by the Academy of Science Fiction, Fantasy and Horror Films to be the best in science fiction, fantasy and horror released in the year 1974 and 1975. They were awarded on January 31, 1976.

For this ceremony, eight new categories were introduced, including four for acting and Best Director; although they were all juried winners with a single individual, expect for a tie for Best Actor.

Below is a complete list of nominees and winners. Winners are highlighted in bold.

== Winners and nominees ==
Best Science Fiction Film	Best Horror Film
**Rollerball**; A Boy and His Dog; The Stepford Wives	**Young Frankenstein**; Black Christmas; Bug; Phantom of the Paradise; The Rocky Horror Picture Show; Vampira
Best Fantasy Film	Best Stop Motion Animation
**Doc Savage: The Man of Bronze**	**Jim Danforth**
Best Director	Best Writing
**Mel Brooks – Young Frankenstein**	**Harlan Ellison** (for his career) / **Ib Melchior** (for his career)
Best Actor	Best Actress
**James Caan – Rollerball as Jonathan E. (TIE)**; **Don Johnson – A Boy and His Dog as Vic (TIE)**	**Katharine Ross – The Stepford Wives as Joanna Eberhart**
Best Supporting Actor	Best Supporting Actress
**Marty Feldman – Young Frankenstein as Igor**	**Ida Lupino – The Devil's Rain as Mrs. Preston**
Best Advertising	Best Cinematography
**Jaws**	**Douglas Slocombe – Rollerball**
Best Make-up	Best Music
**William J. Tuttle – Young Frankenstein**	**Miklós Rózsa** (for his career)
Best Set Decoration	Best Special Effects
**Robert De Vestel and Dale Hennesy – Young Frankenstein**	**John Carpenter, Douglas Knapp, Dan O'Bannon, and Bill Taylor – Dark Star**
Special awards
Outstanding Film of 1975	Life Career Award
**Jaws**	**Fritz Lang**
