= Saturn Award for Best Actor =

Annual US film award

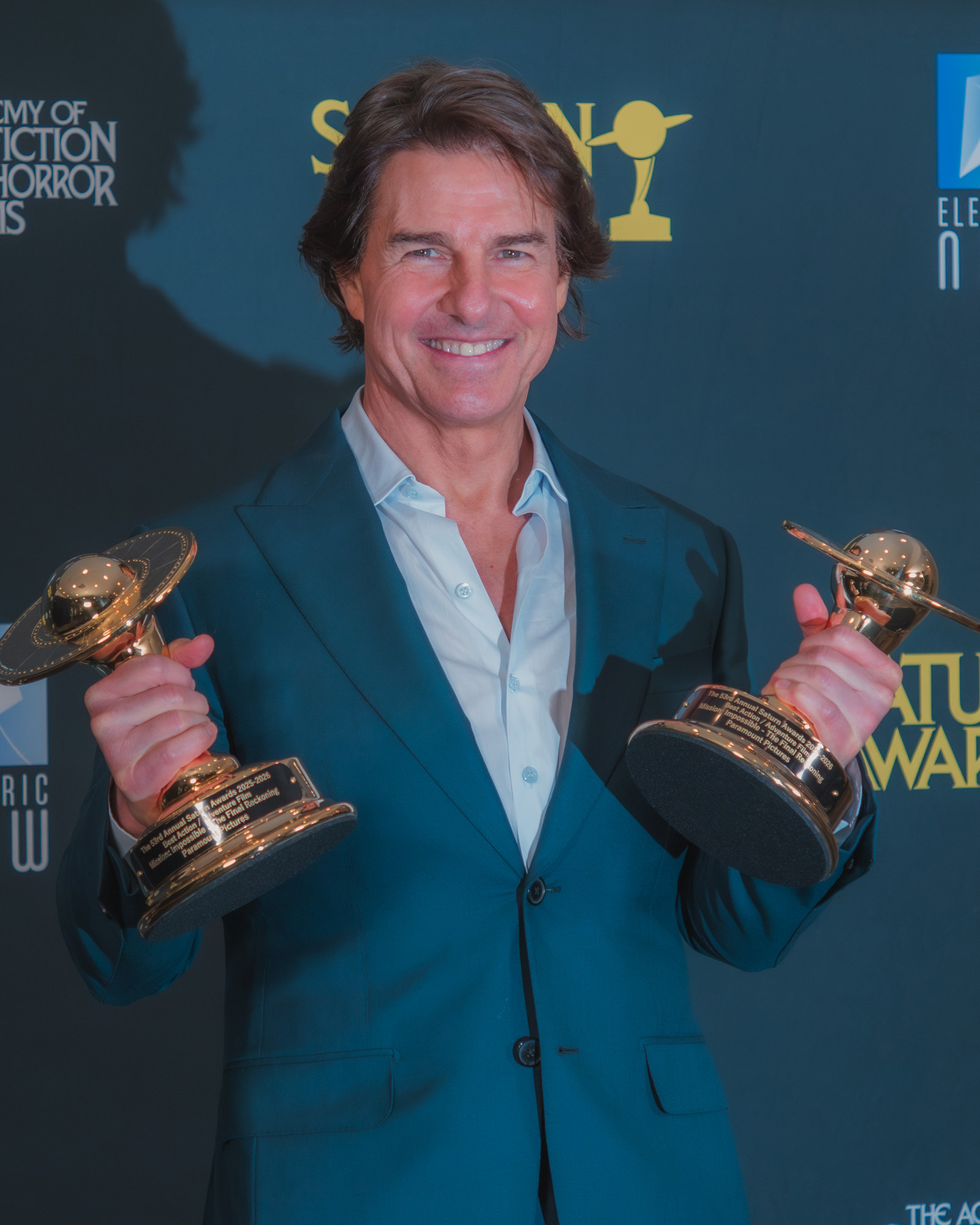
- The 2024/2025 recipient: Tom Cruise
- Awarded for: Best performance of the year by a male in a leading role in a genre film
- Country: United States
- Presented by: Academy of Science Fiction, Fantasy and Horror Films
- First award: 1974/75
- Currently held by: Tom Cruise for Mission: Impossible – The Final Reckoning (2024/25)
- Website: www.saturnawards.org

The Saturn Award for Best Actor is an award presented annually by the Academy of Science Fiction, Fantasy and Horror Films to honor performances in the genre across film, television, and video. The Saturn Awards were devised by historian Dr. Donald A. Reed, who felt that science fiction, fantasy and horror films were never given the appreciation they deserved. The physical award is a representation of the planet Saturn, surrounded with a ring of film. The award was initially and is still sometimes loosely referred to as a Golden Scroll. The award for Best Actor was first introduced in 1976 for the 1974 and 1975 years, to reward a lead performance by a male actor in film.

The record for most awards is held by Robert Downey Jr. with four wins, followed by Tom Cruise, Mark Hamill and Harrison Ford with three, and then Jeff Bridges with two. Cruise is the most nominated actor in the category with twelve nominations, followed by Ford, Downey, Jr. and Arnold Schwarzenegger with seven. Schwarzenegger holds the record for most nominations without a victory. Anthony Hopkins and Martin Landau are the only actors to have won the Saturn Award for Best Actor and an Academy Award for the same role; however, Landau won the Academy Award for Best Supporting Actor and not Best Actor. The record for most wins for playing a same character is held by Downey Jr. and Hamill, who both won three times for playing Tony Stark and Luke Skywalker respectively.

== Winners and nominees ==
=== 1970s ===
Year	Actor	Film	Character
1974/1975 (3rd)	James Caan	Rollerball	Jonathan E.
1974/1975 (3rd)	Don Johnson	A Boy and His Dog	Vic
1976 (4th)	David Bowie	The Man Who Fell to Earth	Thomas Jerome Newton
1977 (5th)	George Burns	Oh, God!	God
1977 (5th)	Richard Dreyfuss	Close Encounters of the Third Kind	Roy Neary
1977 (5th)	Harrison Ford	Star Wars	Han Solo
1977 (5th)	Mark Hamill	Star Wars	Luke Skywalker
1977 (5th)	William Shatner	Kingdom of the Spiders	Dr. Rack Hansen
1977 (5th)	Michael York	The Island of Dr. Moreau	Andrew Braddock
1978 (6th)	Warren Beatty	Heaven Can Wait	Joe Pendleton
1978 (6th)	Christopher Lee	The Wicker Man	Lord Summerisle
1978 (6th)	Laurence Olivier	The Boys from Brazil	Ezra Lieberman
1978 (6th)	Christopher Reeve	Superman	Clark Kent / Superman
1978 (6th)	Donald Sutherland	Invasion of the Body Snatchers	Matthew Bennell
1979 (7th)	George Hamilton	Love at First Bite	Count Vladimir Dracula
1979 (7th)	Frank Langella	Dracula	Count Dracula
1979 (7th)	Christopher Lee	Arabian Adventure	Caliph Alquazar
1979 (7th)	Malcolm McDowell	Time After Time	H. G. Wells
1979 (7th)	William Shatner	Star Trek: The Motion Picture	James T. Kirk

=== 1980s ===
Year	Actor	Film	Character
1980 (8th)	Mark Hamill	The Empire Strikes Back	Luke Skywalker
1980 (8th)	Alan Arkin	Simon	Prof. Simon Mendelssohn
1980 (8th)	Dennis Christopher	Fade to Black	Eric Binford
1980 (8th)	Kirk Douglas	The Final Countdown	Capt. Matthew Yelland
1980 (8th)	Christopher Reeve	Somewhere in Time	Richard Collier
1981 (9th)	Harrison Ford	Raiders of the Lost Ark	Indiana Jones
1981 (9th)	Sean Connery	Outland	Marshal William T. O'Niel
1981 (9th)	Albert Finney	Wolfen	Dewey Wilson
1981 (9th)	Donald Pleasence	Halloween II	Dr. Sam Loomis
1981 (9th)	Christopher Reeve	Superman II	Clark Kent / Superman
1982 (10th)	William Shatner	Star Trek II: The Wrath of Khan	James T. Kirk
1982 (10th)	Mel Gibson	Mad Max 2	Max Rockatansky
1982 (10th)	Lee Horsley	The Sword and the Sorcerer	Prince Talon
1982 (10th)	Christopher Reeve	Deathtrap	Clifford Anderson
1982 (10th)	Henry Thomas	E.T. the Extra-Terrestrial	Elliott
1983 (11th)	Mark Hamill	Return of the Jedi	Luke Skywalker
1983 (11th)	Matthew Broderick	WarGames	David Lightman
1983 (11th)	Christopher Reeve	Superman III	Clark Kent / Superman
1983 (11th)	Roy Scheider	Blue Thunder	Officer Frank Murphy
1983 (11th)	Christopher Walken	The Dead Zone	Johnny Smith
1984 (12th)	Jeff Bridges	Starman	Starman
1984 (12th)	George Burns	Oh, God! You Devil	God / Harry O. Tophet
1984 (12th)	Harrison Ford	Indiana Jones and the Temple of Doom	Indiana Jones
1984 (12th)	Arnold Schwarzenegger	The Terminator	Terminator
1984 (12th)	William Shatner	Star Trek III: The Search for Spock	James T. Kirk
1985 (13th)	Michael J. Fox	Back to the Future	Marty McFly
1985 (13th)	Hume Cronyn	Cocoon	Joe Finley
1985 (13th)	Louis Gossett Jr.	Enemy Mine	Jeriba 'Jerry' Shigan
1985 (13th)	James Karen	The Return of the Living Dead	Frank
1985 (13th)	Chris Sarandon	Fright Night	Jerry Dandrige
1986 (14th)	Jeff Goldblum	The Fly	Seth Brundle
1986 (14th)	Michael Biehn	Aliens	Corporal Dwayne Hicks
1986 (14th)	Leonard Nimoy	Star Trek IV: The Voyage Home	Spock
1986 (14th)	Anthony Perkins	Psycho III	Norman Bates
1986 (14th)	William Shatner	Star Trek IV: The Voyage Home	James T. Kirk
1987 (15th)	Jack Nicholson	The Witches of Eastwick	Daryl Van Horne
1987 (15th)	Lance Henriksen	Pumpkinhead	Ed Harley
1987 (15th)	Michael Nouri	The Hidden	Det. Tom Beck
1987 (15th)	Terry O'Quinn	The Stepfather	Jerry Blake
1987 (15th)	Arnold Schwarzenegger	Predator	Major Alan "Dutch" Schaefer
1987 (15th)	Peter Weller	RoboCop	Alex Murphy / RoboCop
1988 (16th)	Tom Hanks	Big	Josh Baskin
1988 (16th)	Hume Cronyn	Cocoon: The Return	Joe Finley
1988 (16th)	Bob Hoskins	Who Framed Roger Rabbit	Eddie Valiant
1988 (16th)	Jeremy Irons	Dead Ringers	Beverly Mantle / Elliot Mantle
1988 (16th)	Bill Murray	Scrooged	Frank Cross
1988 (16th)	James Spader	Jack's Back	John / Rick Wesford
1989/1990 (17th)	Jeff Daniels	Arachnophobia	Dr. Ross Jennings
1989/1990 (17th)	Warren Beatty	Dick Tracy	Dick Tracy
1989/1990 (17th)	Harrison Ford	Indiana Jones and the Last Crusade	Indiana Jones
1989/1990 (17th)	Ed Harris	The Abyss	Virgil 'Bud' Brigman
1989/1990 (17th)	Axel Jodorowsky	Santa Sangre	Fenix
1989/1990 (17th)	Liam Neeson	Darkman	Peyton Westlake / Darkman
1989/1990 (17th)	Jack Nicholson	Batman	Jack Napier / The Joker
1989/1990 (17th)	Arnold Schwarzenegger	Total Recall	Douglas Quaid / Hauser
1989/1990 (17th)	Patrick Swayze	Ghost	Sam Wheat

=== 1990s ===
Year	Actor	Film	Character
1991 (18th)	Anthony Hopkins	The Silence of the Lambs	Dr. Hannibal Lecter
1991 (18th)	Jeff Bridges	The Fisher King	Jack Lucas
1991 (18th)	James Caan	Misery	Paul Sheldon
1991 (18th)	Kevin Costner	Robin Hood: Prince of Thieves	Robin Hood
1991 (18th)	Arnold Schwarzenegger	Terminator 2: Judgment Day	Terminator
1991 (18th)	Robin Williams	The Fisher King	Parry
1992 (19th)	Gary Oldman	Bram Stoker's Dracula	Count Dracula / Vlad Dracula
1992 (19th)	Chevy Chase	Memoirs of an Invisible Man	Nick Halloway
1992 (19th)	Michael Gambon	Toys	Lt. General Leland Zevo
1992 (19th)	Raúl Juliá	The Addams Family	Gomez Addams
1992 (19th)	John Lithgow	Raising Cain	Dr. Carter Nix/Cain/Nix Sr/Josh/Margo
1992 (19th)	Robin Williams	Toys	Leslie Zevo
1992 (19th)	Bruce Willis	Death Becomes Her	Dr. Ernest Menville
1993 (20th)	Robert Downey Jr.	Heart and Souls	Thomas Reilly
1993 (20th)	Jeff Bridges	The Vanishing	Barney Cousins
1993 (20th)	Bill Murray	Groundhog Day	Phil Connors
1993 (20th)	Robert Patrick	Fire in the Sky	Mike Rogers
1993 (20th)	Arnold Schwarzenegger	Last Action Hero	Jack Slater
1993 (20th)	Christian Slater	True Romance	Clarence Worley
1993 (20th)	Max von Sydow	Needful Things	Leland Gaunt
1994 (21st)	Martin Landau	Ed Wood	Bela Lugosi
1994 (21st)	Kenneth Branagh	Mary Shelley’s Frankenstein	Victor Frankenstein
1994 (21st)	Tom Cruise	Interview with the Vampire	Lestat de Lioncourt
1994 (21st)	Tom Hanks	Forrest Gump	Forrest Gump
1994 (21st)	Jack Nicholson	Wolf	Will Randall
1994 (21st)	Brad Pitt	Interview with the Vampire	Louis de Pointe du Lac
1994 (21st)	Arnold Schwarzenegger	True Lies	Harry Tasker
1995 (22nd)	George Clooney	From Dusk till Dawn	Seth Gecko
1995 (22nd)	Pierce Brosnan	GoldenEye	James Bond
1995 (22nd)	Ralph Fiennes	Strange Days	Lenny Nero
1995 (22nd)	Morgan Freeman	Se7en	William Somerset
1995 (22nd)	Robin Williams	Jumanji	Alan Parrish
1995 (22nd)	Bruce Willis	12 Monkeys	James Cole
1996 (23rd)	Eddie Murphy	The Nutty Professor	Professor Sherman Klump, also: Buddy Love, Lance Perkins, Papa Klump, Mama Klump, Grandma Klump, Ernie Klump
1996 (23rd)	Michael J. Fox	The Frighteners	Frank Bannister
1996 (23rd)	Jeff Goldblum	Independence Day	David Levinson
1996 (23rd)	Bill Paxton	Twister	Bill Harding
1996 (23rd)	Will Smith	Independence Day	Captain Steven Hiller
1996 (23rd)	Patrick Stewart	Star Trek: First Contact	Captain Jean-Luc Picard
1997 (24th)	Pierce Brosnan	Tomorrow Never Dies	James Bond
1997 (24th)	Nicolas Cage	Face/Off	Castor Troy / Sean Archer
1997 (24th)	Kevin Costner	The Postman	The Postman
1997 (24th)	Al Pacino	The Devil's Advocate	John Milton
1997 (24th)	Will Smith	Men in Black	Agent J
1997 (24th)	John Travolta	Face/Off	Sean Archer / Castor Troy
1998 (25th)	James Woods	Vampires	Jack Crow
1998 (25th)	Jim Carrey	The Truman Show	Truman Burbank
1998 (25th)	David Duchovny	The X-Files: Fight the Future	Special Agent Fox Mulder
1998 (25th)	Anthony Hopkins	Meet Joe Black	William Parrish
1998 (25th)	Edward Norton	American History X	Derek Vinyard
1998 (25th)	Bruce Willis	Armageddon	Harry Stamper
1999 (26th)	Tim Allen	Galaxy Quest	Jason Nesmith / Cmdr. Taggart
1999 (26th)	Johnny Depp	Sleepy Hollow	Ichabod Crane
1999 (26th)	Brendan Fraser	The Mummy	Richard "Rick" O'Connell
1999 (26th)	Liam Neeson	Star Wars: Episode I – The Phantom Menace	Qui-Gon Jinn
1999 (26th)	Keanu Reeves	The Matrix	Thomas Anderson / Neo
1999 (26th)	Bruce Willis	The Sixth Sense	Dr. Malcolm Crowe

=== 2000s ===
Year	Actor	Film	Character
2000 (27th)	Hugh Jackman	X-Men	Logan / Wolverine
2000 (27th)	Jim Carrey	How the Grinch Stole Christmas	Grinch
2000 (27th)	Russell Crowe	Gladiator	Maximus Decimus Meridius
2000 (27th)	Clint Eastwood	Space Cowboys	Colonel Frank Corvin
2000 (27th)	Arnold Schwarzenegger	The 6th Day	Adam Gibson / Adam Gibson Clone
2000 (27th)	Chow Yun-fat	Crouching Tiger, Hidden Dragon	Li Mu Bai
2001 (28th)	Tom Cruise	Vanilla Sky	David Aames
2001 (28th)	Johnny Depp	From Hell	Inspector Frederick Abberline
2001 (28th)	Anthony Hopkins	Hannibal	Hannibal Lecter
2001 (28th)	Guy Pearce	Memento	Leonard Shelby
2001 (28th)	Kevin Spacey	K-PAX	Prot / Robert Porter
2001 (28th)	Billy Bob Thornton	The Man Who Wasn't There	Ed Crane
2002 (29th)	Robin Williams	One Hour Photo	Seymour Parrish
2002 (29th)	Pierce Brosnan	Die Another Day	James Bond
2002 (29th)	George Clooney	Solaris	Chris Kelvin
2002 (29th)	Tom Cruise	Minority Report	John Anderton
2002 (29th)	Tobey Maguire	Spider-Man	Peter Parker / Spider-Man
2002 (29th)	Viggo Mortensen	The Lord of the Rings: The Two Towers	Aragorn
2003 (30th)	Elijah Wood	The Lord of the Rings: The Return of the King	Frodo Baggins
2003 (30th)	Tom Cruise	The Last Samurai	Nathan Algren
2003 (30th)	Johnny Depp	Pirates of the Caribbean: The Curse of the Black Pearl	Captain Jack Sparrow
2003 (30th)	Albert Finney	Big Fish	old Edward Bloom
2003 (30th)	Crispin Glover	Willard	Willard Stiles
2003 (30th)	Viggo Mortensen	The Lord of the Rings: The Return of the King	Aragorn
2004 (31st)	Tobey Maguire	Spider-Man 2	Peter Parker / Spider-Man
2004 (31st)	Christian Bale	The Machinist	Trevor Reznik
2004 (31st)	Jim Carrey	Eternal Sunshine of the Spotless Mind	Joel Barish
2004 (31st)	Tom Cruise	Collateral	Vincent
2004 (31st)	Matt Damon	The Bourne Supremacy	Jason Bourne
2004 (31st)	Johnny Depp	Finding Neverland	Sir James Matthew Barrie
2005 (32nd)	Christian Bale	Batman Begins	Bruce Wayne / Batman
2005 (32nd)	Pierce Brosnan	The Matador	Julian Noble
2005 (32nd)	Hayden Christensen	Star Wars: Episode III – Revenge of the Sith	Anakin Skywalker / Darth Vader
2005 (32nd)	Tom Cruise	War of the Worlds	Ray Ferrier
2005 (32nd)	Robert Downey Jr.	Kiss Kiss Bang Bang	Harry Lockhart
2005 (32nd)	Viggo Mortensen	A History of Violence	Tom Stall / Joey Cusack
2006 (33rd)	Brandon Routh	Superman Returns	Clark Kent / Superman
2006 (33rd)	Daniel Craig	Casino Royale	James Bond
2006 (33rd)	Tom Cruise	Mission: Impossible III	Ethan Hunt
2006 (33rd)	Will Ferrell	Stranger than Fiction	Harold Crick
2006 (33rd)	Hugh Jackman	The Fountain	Tomas / Tommy / Tom Creo
2006 (33rd)	Clive Owen	Children of Men	Theo Faron
2007 (34th)	Will Smith	I Am Legend	Dr. Robert Neville
2007 (34th)	Gerard Butler	300	King Leonidas
2007 (34th)	John Cusack	1408	Mike Enslin
2007 (34th)	Daniel Day-Lewis	There Will Be Blood	Daniel Plainview
2007 (34th)	Johnny Depp	Sweeney Todd: The Demon Barber of Fleet Street	Benjamin Barker / Sweeney Todd
2007 (34th)	Viggo Mortensen	Eastern Promises	Nikolai Luzhin
2008 (35th)	Robert Downey Jr.	Iron Man	Tony Stark / Iron Man
2008 (35th)	Christian Bale	The Dark Knight	Bruce Wayne / Batman
2008 (35th)	Tom Cruise	Valkyrie	Colonel Claus von Stauffenberg
2008 (35th)	Harrison Ford	Indiana Jones and the Kingdom of the Crystal Skull	Indiana Jones
2008 (35th)	Brad Pitt	The Curious Case of Benjamin Button	Benjamin Button
2008 (35th)	Will Smith	Hancock	John Hancock
2009 (36th)	Sam Worthington	Avatar	Jake Sully
2009 (36th)	Robert Downey Jr.	Sherlock Holmes	Sherlock Holmes
2009 (36th)	Tobey Maguire	Brothers	Capt. Sam Cahill
2009 (36th)	Viggo Mortensen	The Road	Man
2009 (36th)	Sam Rockwell	Moon	Sam Bell
2009 (36th)	Denzel Washington	The Book of Eli	Eli

=== 2010s ===
Year	Actor	Film	Character
2010 (37th)	Jeff Bridges	Tron: Legacy	Kevin Flynn / CLU
2010 (37th)	George Clooney	The American	Jack / Edward
2010 (37th)	Leonardo DiCaprio	Inception	Dom Cobb
2010 (37th)	Leonardo DiCaprio	Shutter Island	Teddy Daniels
2010 (37th)	Robert Downey Jr.	Iron Man 2	Tony Stark / Iron Man
2010 (37th)	Ryan Reynolds	Buried	Paul Conroy
2011 (38th)	Michael Shannon	Take Shelter	Curtis LaForche
2011 (38th)	Antonio Banderas	The Skin I Live In	Dr. Robert Ledgard
2011 (38th)	Dominic Cooper	The Devil's Double	Uday Hussein / Latif Yahia
2011 (38th)	Tom Cruise	Mission: Impossible – Ghost Protocol	Ethan Hunt
2011 (38th)	Chris Evans	Captain America: The First Avenger	Steve Rogers / Captain America
2011 (38th)	Ben Kingsley	Hugo	Georges Méliès
2012 (39th)	Matthew McConaughey	Killer Joe	Joe Cooper
2012 (39th)	Christian Bale	The Dark Knight Rises	Bruce Wayne / Batman
2012 (39th)	Daniel Craig	Skyfall	James Bond
2012 (39th)	Martin Freeman	The Hobbit: An Unexpected Journey	Young Bilbo Baggins
2012 (39th)	Joseph Gordon-Levitt	Looper	Young Joe
2012 (39th)	Hugh Jackman	Les Misérables	Jean Valjean
2013 (40th)	Robert Downey Jr.	Iron Man 3	Tony Stark / Iron Man
2013 (40th)	Oscar Isaac	Inside Llewyn Davis	Llewyn Davis
2013 (40th)	Simon Pegg	The World's End	Gary King
2013 (40th)	Joaquin Phoenix	Her	Theodore Twombly
2013 (40th)	Brad Pitt	World War Z	Gerry Lane
2013 (40th)	Ben Stiller	The Secret Life of Walter Mitty	Walter Mitty
2014 (41st)	Chris Pratt	Guardians of the Galaxy	Peter Quill / Star-Lord
2014 (41st)	Tom Cruise	Edge of Tomorrow	Maj. William Cage
2014 (41st)	Chris Evans	Captain America: The Winter Soldier	Steve Rogers / Captain America
2014 (41st)	Jake Gyllenhaal	Nightcrawler	Louis Bloom
2014 (41st)	Michael Keaton	Birdman	Riggan Thomson / Birdman
2014 (41st)	Matthew McConaughey	Interstellar	Cooper
2014 (41st)	Dan Stevens	The Guest	David Collins
2015 (42nd)	Harrison Ford	Star Wars: The Force Awakens	Han Solo
2015 (42nd)	John Boyega	Star Wars: The Force Awakens	Finn
2015 (42nd)	Matt Damon	The Martian	Mark Watney
2015 (42nd)	Leonardo DiCaprio	The Revenant	Hugh Glass
2015 (42nd)	Taron Egerton	Kingsman: The Secret Service	Gary "Eggsy" Unwin
2015 (42nd)	Domhnall Gleeson	Ex Machina	Caleb Smith
2015 (42nd)	Samuel L. Jackson	The Hateful Eight	Major Marquis Warren
2015 (42nd)	Paul Rudd	Ant-Man	Scott Lang / Ant-Man
2016 (43rd)	Ryan Reynolds	Deadpool	Wade Wilson / Deadpool
2016 (43rd)	Benedict Cumberbatch	Doctor Strange	Dr. Stephen Strange
2016 (43rd)	Chris Evans	Captain America: Civil War	Steve Rogers / Captain America
2016 (43rd)	Matthew McConaughey	Gold	Kenny Wells
2016 (43rd)	Chris Pine	Star Trek Beyond	Captain James T. Kirk
2016 (43rd)	Chris Pratt	Passengers	Jim Preston
2016 (43rd)	Mark Rylance	The BFG	The BFG
2017 (44th)	Mark Hamill	Star Wars: The Last Jedi	Luke Skywalker
2017 (44th)	Chadwick Boseman	Black Panther	T'Challa / Black Panther
2017 (44th)	Ryan Gosling	Blade Runner 2049	K
2017 (44th)	Hugh Jackman	Logan	Logan / Wolverine
2017 (44th)	Daniel Kaluuya	Get Out	Chris Washington
2017 (44th)	Andy Serkis	War for the Planet of the Apes	Caesar
2017 (44th)	Vince Vaughn	Brawl in Cell Block 99	Bradley Thomas
2018/2019 (45th)	Robert Downey Jr.	Avengers: Endgame	Tony Stark / Iron Man
2018/2019 (45th)	Jeff Bridges	Bad Times at the El Royale	Father Daniel Flynn / Dock O'Kelly
2018/2019 (45th)	Nicolas Cage	Mandy	Red Miller
2018/2019 (45th)	Tom Cruise	Mission: Impossible – Fallout	Ethan Hunt
2018/2019 (45th)	Chris Evans	Avengers: Endgame	Steve Rogers / Captain America
2018/2019 (45th)	Mel Gibson	Dragged Across Concrete	Brett Ridgeman
2018/2019 (45th)	Keanu Reeves	John Wick: Chapter 3 – Parabellum	John Wick / Jardani Jovonovich
2019/2020 (46th)	John David Washington	Tenet	Protagonist
2019/2020 (46th)	Daniel Craig	Knives Out	Benoit Blanc
2019/2020 (46th)	Delroy Lindo	Da 5 Bloods	Paul
2019/2020 (46th)	Ewan McGregor	Doctor Sleep	Dan Torrance
2019/2020 (46th)	Gary Oldman	Mank	Herman J. Mankiewicz
2019/2020 (46th)	Aaron Paul	El Camino: A Breaking Bad Movie	Jesse Pinkman
2019/2020 (46th)	Joaquin Phoenix	Joker	Arthur Fleck / Joker

=== 2020s ===
Year	Actor	Film	Character
2021/2022 (50th)	Tom Cruise	Top Gun: Maverick	Pete "Maverick" Mitchell
2021/2022 (50th)	Timothée Chalamet	Dune	Paul Atreides
2021/2022 (50th)	Idris Elba	The Suicide Squad	Robert DuBois / Bloodsport
2021/2022 (50th)	Tom Holland	Spider-Man: No Way Home	Peter Parker / Spider-Man / "Peter-One"
2021/2022 (50th)	Daniel Kaluuya	Nope	Otis "OJ" Haywood Jr.
2021/2022 (50th)	Simu Liu	Shang-Chi and the Legend of the Ten Rings	Xu Shang-Chi
2021/2022 (50th)	Robert Pattinson	The Batman	Bruce Wayne / Batman
2022/2023 (51st)	Harrison Ford	Indiana Jones and the Dial of Destiny	Indiana Jones
2022/2023 (51st)	Ralph Fiennes	The Menu	Chef Julian Slowik
2022/2023 (51st)	Ben Kingsley	Jules	Milton Robinson
2022/2023 (51st)	Cillian Murphy	Oppenheimer	J. Robert Oppenheimer
2022/2023 (51st)	Chris Pratt	Guardians of the Galaxy Vol. 3	Peter Quill / Star-Lord
2022/2023 (51st)	Keanu Reeves	John Wick: Chapter 4	John Wick
2022/2023 (51st)	Sam Worthington	Avatar: The Way of Water	Jake Sully
2023/2024 (52nd)	Nicolas Cage	Dream Scenario	Dr. Paul Matthews
2023/2024 (52nd)	Tom Blyth	The Hunger Games: The Ballad of Songbirds and Snakes	Coriolanus Snow
2023/2024 (52nd)	Timothée Chalamet	Dune: Part Two	Paul Atreides
2023/2024 (52nd)	David Dastmalchian	Late Night with the Devil	Jack Delroy
2023/2024 (52nd)	Kyle Gallner	Strange Darling	The Demon
2023/2024 (52nd)	Michael Keaton	Beetlejuice Beetlejuice	Betelgeuse
2023/2024 (52nd)	Ryan Reynolds	Deadpool & Wolverine	Wade Wilson / Deadpool
2024/2025 (53rd)	Tom Cruise	Mission: Impossible – The Final Reckoning	Ethan Hunt
2024/2025 (53rd)	David Corenswet	Superman	Clark Kent / Kal-El / Superman
2024/2025 (53rd)	Tom Hiddleston	The Life of Chuck	Charles "Chuck" Krantz
2024/2025 (53rd)	Oscar Isaac	Frankenstein	Victor Frankenstein
2024/2025 (53rd)	Michael B. Jordan	Sinners	Elijah "Smoke" Moore / Elias "Stack" Moore
2024/2025 (53rd)	Pedro Pascal	The Fantastic Four: First Steps	Reed Richards / Mr. Fantastic
2024/2025 (53rd)	Sam Worthington	Avatar: Fire and Ash	Jake Sully

== Multiple nominations ==
13 nominations

- Tom Cruise

7 nominations

- Robert Downey Jr.
- Harrison Ford
- Arnold Schwarzenegger

5 nominations

- Jeff Bridges
- Johnny Depp
- Viggo Mortensen
- Christopher Reeve
- William Shatner

4 nominations

- Christian Bale
- Pierce Brosnan
- Chris Evans
- Mark Hamill
- Hugh Jackman
- Will Smith
- Robin Williams
- Bruce Willis

3 nominations

- Nicolas Cage
- Jim Carrey
- George Clooney
- Daniel Craig
- Leonardo DiCaprio
- Anthony Hopkins
- Tobey Maguire
- Matthew McConaughey
- Jack Nicholson
- Brad Pitt
- Chris Pratt
- Keanu Reeves
- Ryan Reynolds
- Sam Worthington

2 nominations

- Warren Beatty
- George Burns
- James Caan
- Timothee Chalamet
- Kevin Costner
- Hume Cronyn
- Matt Damon
- Ralph Fiennes
- Albert Finney
- Michael J. Fox
- Mel Gibson
- Jeff Goldblum
- Tom Hanks
- Oscar Isaac
- Daniel Kaluuya
- Michael Keaton
- Ben Kingsley
- Christopher Lee
- Bill Murray
- Liam Neeson
- Gary Oldman
- Joaquin Phoenix

== Multiple wins ==
4 wins

- Robert Downey Jr.

3 wins

- Tom Cruise
- Mark Hamill
- Harrison Ford

2 wins

- Jeff Bridges
