= Logan's Run (film) =

1976 film

- Theatrical release poster by Charles Moll
- Directed by: Michael Anderson
- Screenplay by: David Zelag Goodman
- Based on: Logan's Run; 1967 novel by William F. Nolan; George Clayton Johnson
- Produced by: Saul David
- Starring: Michael York; Jenny Agutter; Richard Jordan; Roscoe Lee Browne; Farrah Fawcett-Majors; Peter Ustinov
- Cinematography: Ernest Laszlo
- Edited by: Bob Wyman
- Music by: Jerry Goldsmith
- Production company: Metro-Goldwyn-Mayer
- Distributed by: United Artists
- Release date: June 23, 1976
- Running time: 118 minutes
- Country: United States
- Language: English
- Budget: $7–8 million
- Box office: $25 million (US)

Logan's Run is a 1976 American science fiction action film directed by Michael Anderson and starring Michael York, Jenny Agutter, Richard Jordan, Roscoe Lee Browne, Farrah Fawcett, and Peter Ustinov. The screenplay by David Zelag Goodman is based on the 1967 novel Logan's Run by William F. Nolan and George Clayton Johnson. It depicts a future society, on the surface a utopia, but soon revealed as a dystopia in which the population and the consumption of resources are maintained in equilibrium by killing everyone who reaches the age of 30. The story follows the actions of Logan 5, a "Sandman" who has terminated others who have attempted to escape death and is now faced with termination as well.

Produced by Metro-Goldwyn-Mayer, the film uses only the novel's two basic premises — that everyone must die at a set age, and that Logan and his companion Jessica attempt to escape while being chased by another Sandman named Francis. After aborted attempts to adapt the novel, story changes were made, including raising the age of "last day" from 21 to 30 and introducing the idea of "Carrousel" [sic] for eliminating 30-year-olds. Its filming was marked by special-effects challenges in depicting Carrousel and innovative use of holograms and wide-angle lenses.

The film won a Special Academy Award for its visual effects and six Saturn Awards, including Best Science Fiction Film. A spin-off TV series aired in 1977–1978 on CBS for 14 episodes.

== Plot ==
Sometime in the 23rd century...
the survivors of war, overpopulation and pollution are living in a great domed city, sealed away from the forgotten world outside. Here, in an ecologically balanced world, mankind lives only for pleasure, freed by the servo-mechanisms which provide everything.

There's just one catch:
Life must end at thirty unless reborn in the fiery ritual of carrousel.

— Opening caption

In the year of the city 2274, the remnants of human civilization live in a sealed city beneath a cluster of geodesic domes, a utopia run by a computer. The citizens live a hedonistic lifestyle, but when they turn 30 must enter the "Carrousel", a public ritual that destroys their bodies, under the pretense they would be "Renewed" or reborn. Each person has embedded in their hand a "life-clock" crystal that changes color as they age, up to their "Last Day". Residents who attempt to flee the city are known as "Runners", and the team of huntsmen known as "Sandmen" are tasked with pursuing and terminating them.

Sandmen Logan 5 and Francis 7 attend a Carrousel ceremony until they are called to terminate a nearby Runner. Logan finds a pendant symbol among the Runner's possessions. That evening, Logan meets with Jessica 6, a young woman wearing the same symbol.

Logan learns from the computer that the symbol is an ankh and related to a place called "Sanctuary", which the Runners appear to be seeking. There are 1,056 Runners not accounted for. The computer orders Logan to find the Sanctuary and destroy it, but he must keep this mission secret from the other Sandmen. The computer changes the color of Logan's crystal to flashing red, essentially cutting his lifespan by four years and close to Last Day, but it does not respond when Logan questions whether he would get his years restored afterward.

Logan tells Jessica he intends to be a Runner. In the Cathedral Plaza area, after they confront some hostile youths, Logan tries to help an escaping woman Runner there, but she is killed by Francis, who now considers Logan an enemy. After unsuccessfully trying facial cosmetic surgery and evading Francis in a sex club, Logan and Jessica meet the underground group, who direct them towards the city gate. Near the surface, they encounter and defeat Box, a robot who was originally designed to capture and freeze marine life for city food, but has since frozen any Runners who have made it that far.

Logan and Jessica escape the city, discovering that, absent the computer's influence, their crystals are now clear-colored. They enter the abandoned overgrown city that was once Washington, D.C. In the ruins of the United States Senate chamber, they encounter an elderly man living with many cats. The man shares what he knows about his life, including that he had biological parents. Logan realizes that Sanctuary does not physically exist; only the idea and concept to give people hope exists.

Francis has followed them; he and Logan fight until Francis is mortally wounded. Logan, Jessica, and the old man head back to the dome city, but the old man stays outside, while the two re-enter through the underwater tunnels. They shout at the people to stop entering the Carrousel but no one listens to them, and the two are subsequently captured. The computer overloads after scanning Logan's brain multiple times and only getting the message "there is no Sanctuary". Logan is freed and shoots the computer; the whole facility self-destructs and falls violently, causing everyone to panic and flee. Once outside, the people gather around an artificial waterfall pool and meet the old man.

== Cast ==
- Michael York as Logan 5
- Richard Jordan as Francis 7
- Jenny Agutter as Jessica 6
- Roscoe Lee Browne as Box
- Farrah Fawcett-Majors as Holly 13
- Michael Anderson Jr. as Doc
- Peter Ustinov as Old Man
- Randolph Roberts as 2nd Sanctuary Man
- Lara Lindsay as The Woman Runner / City Computer (voice, uncredited)
- Gary Morgan as Billy, leader of the Cubs
- Ashley Cox as Timid Girl
- Michelle Stacy as Mary 2, the little girl Cub

== Production ==
=== Development ===
MGM's early attempts to adapt the book led to development hell. Producer George Pal's attempt was troubled in 1969 by competing views of what the film's story should be, including the possibility of incorporating symbolism of real-life issues, in comparison to screenwriter Richard Maibaum's vision.

Rewriting Maibaum's screenplay would have taken between two and three months, and the budget would have had to have been reassessed. Pal became concerned the delays would cause the film to miss the wave of success science fiction was enjoying with 2001: A Space Odyssey and Planet of the Apes in 1968.

American International Pictures offered to buy Pal's projects, including Logan's Run, for $200,000, but MGM declined, only willing to accept a minimum of $350,000. Pal left the project to produce Doc Savage: The Man of Bronze (1975) for Warner Bros.

Saul David assumed responsibility in 1974, with Soylent Green author Stanley R. Greenberg assigned to write. Greenberg devised the idea of Carrousel, but afterwards dropped off the project. David Zelag Goodman wrote a nearly completely new screenplay, raising the age of death from 21 to 30 to allow for more actors to be considered for casting.

=== Casting ===
York, Agutter, and William Devane were cast in the lead roles, with Devane announced to play an "elite" Sandman in May 1975. Devane withdrew from the project and replaced Roy Thinnes in Alfred Hitchcock's 1976 film Family Plot.

Stepping in for Devane was Richard Jordan, best known for his performances in Lawman (1971), Chato's Land (1972), Rooster Cogburn (1975) and the 1976 TV mini-series Captains and the Kings. York had previously appeared in Cabaret (1972), The Three Musketeers (1973) and Murder on the Orient Express (1974), while Agutter was best known for The Railway Children (1970) and Walkabout (1971). York and Agutter were 33 and 23 respectively, casting made justifiable by Goodman raising the age of death to 30.

In September 1975, it was announced Peter Ustinov would play "the last man alive in Washington, D.C." in the film. Farrah Fawcett has a small role, but her rising celebrity in television earned her a prominent credit (as Farrah Fawcett-Majors).

=== Filming ===
Special effects artists L.B. Abbott and Glen Robinson regarded Carrousel as the most difficult part of the film to portray, requiring hidden wires to depict the levitation. For the scene in which Logan is interrogated by the Deep Sleep central computer, it was decided that genuine holograms would be the most convincing and Saul David said that a new hologram effect should be created. The robot character Box was portrayed by placing actor Roscoe Lee Browne in a robot costume. Rainbow tape had just been invented and was used on the models for the city scenes. It gave a futuristic effect.

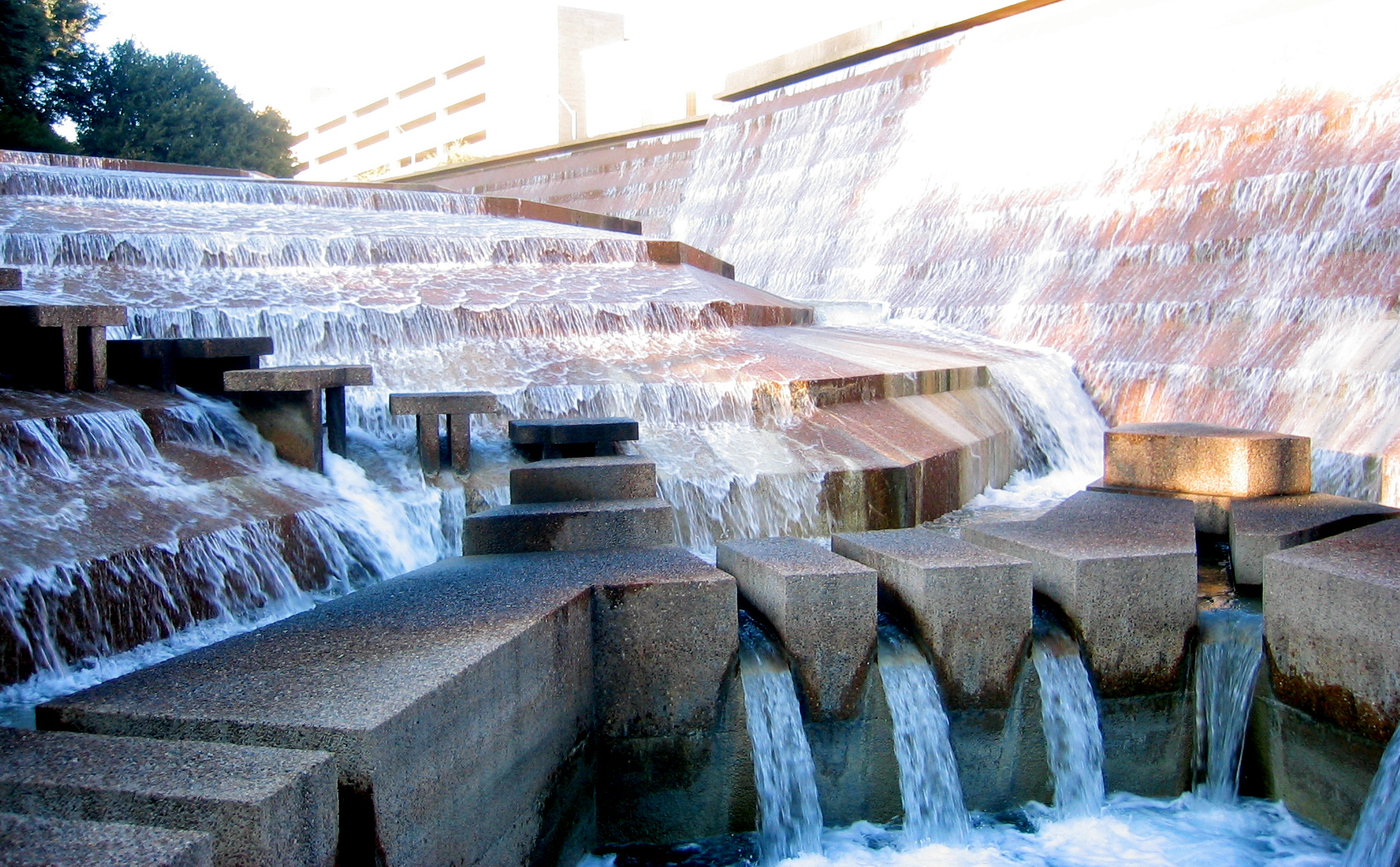
Location of the scene where Logan 5 and Jessica 6 dive into the water to swim back to the city. Fort Worth Water Gardens, United States.

The filmmakers also made use of wide-angle lenses not generally available. It became the first film to use Dolby Stereo on 70 mm prints. Nine entire sound stages were used at MGM in Culver City, California, hosting a miniature city among the largest of its kind built to date.

Producers saved $3 million by finding readily available locations in numerous Dallas buildings, including the Apparel Mart at Dallas Market Center (The Great Hall), Oz Restaurant and Nightclub (The Love Shop) and Pegasus Place (Sandman headquarters), the Fort Worth Water Gardens, and the Hyatt Regency Hotel in Houston. The Sewage Disposal Plant in El Segundo, California was used for the underground escape sequences.

=== Post-production ===
Post-production took eight months, including completion of the score. The score was composed and conducted by Jerry Goldsmith, with orchestrations by Arthur Morton. The score "adheres to two distinct sound palettes: strings, keyboards and abstract electronics only for cues inside the City and full orchestra for outside". The first release of portions of the score was on LP released in 1976 by MGM Records. The complete expanded and newly remixed score was issued on CD in January 2002 by Film Score Monthly.

The film was previewed for test audiences prior to its release. A few sequences were edited or shortened as a result. These included a longer sequence in the ice cave, where Box asked Logan and Jessica to pose for his ice sculpture. This was cut due to extensive nudity so that the film could receive a PG rating (PG-13 did not exist yet) and for length. Other scenes were removed, including a sequence where Francis hunts down a runner by himself at the beginning of the film. Other sequences were trimmed to include a "... knock-down, drag-out fight" scene between Jessica and Holly 13. Some of these scenes are featured as extras in the 1998 DVD release. Other scenes survive in the shooting script, but the footage appears lost. At the end of the process, the budget had escalated from the projected $3 million to $9 million, an expensive film for 1976 (equivalent to $50.9 million now). It was noted for being the most expensive MGM film made in ten years, with most of the budget going to the sets.

== Themes ==
Logan's Run explores utopian and dystopian themes, with the idea that characters willingly die instead of reaching advanced ages, reflecting the idea that "utopias require its participants to give something up in order to create harmony and uniformity". Common dystopian themes include an evil ruling authority, the confiscation of children from parents, life in a city, and the idea of human overpopulation, in this case, causing the protagonists to leave the urban environment.

Prominent concepts in the film are "the dangers of hedonism, youth worship, and, particularly, the dangers of government-sponsored euthanasia". The hedonism is primarily conveyed in the form of sensuality and "images of sexual abandon". Aside from sexual freedom, the pursuit of pleasure is also reflected in how this was envisioned in the 1970s, including miniskirts, little career, relaxed gyms, and Farrah Fawcett's "shag" haircut. Author Barna William Donovan argues this serves to criticize many social developments underway in the 1970s, targeting the "Me generation". Writer Robert Tinnell hypothesizes the design of the city, reminiscent of a shopping mall, is also suggestive of "anticonsumerist sentiment". The film may ultimately serve as a warning against overthrowing older generations, aimed at young viewers following the counterculture movements in the 1960s.

Another interpretation is that individualism, the "freedom to live and be", is curbed by "social mechanisms" telling citizens to have a good life for only a limited time. Logan, originally part of an "artificial society" centered on "pleasure and spectacle", becomes "re-individualised" and defies a "conformist system". Despite the reflections of the 1970s, Donovan argues the film may also have relevance to the Internet age, with elements evocative of online dating.

Writers have also examined the film's statements on gender and race. At one point in the film, Logan asks Jessica whether she prefers women after she expresses no romantic interest in him. His casual, non-judgmental tone indicates homosexuality is no longer taboo in the film's futuristic society, a possible side-effect of sex no longer being related to childbearing. Ultimately, author Bonnie Noonan believes the idea of returning to the concept of "beloved wife" is a sign that, in the story, women's liberation, and not technology, is at the root of the dystopia.

Martin Kevorkian (Professor of English at the University of Texas at Austin) argued that Box, the character voiced by African-American actor Roscoe Lee Browne, could serve as a precursor to Darth Vader, voiced by African-American actor James Earl Jones in Star Wars (1977), in "racializing cyberphobic primers available to Generation X".

== Reception ==
=== Box office ===
In its first five days in theatres in 1976, Logan's Run grossed $2.5 million, a substantial sum at the time (equivalent to $14.1 million now). The film finished its run with a gross of $25 million in North America (equivalent to $141 million now), and a solid performance in other territories.

The film is credited with helping MGM recover from indebtedness and was a hit with young audiences in particular.

=== Critical response ===
The film received a generally mixed response. Roger Ebert gave the film a three-star rating, calling the film a "vast, silly extravaganza", with a plot that's a "cross between Arthur C. Clarke's The City and the Stars and elements of Planet of the Apes" and "that delivers a certain amount of fun". Variety staff called the film "rewarding" in its escapism and intelligence.

Vincent Canby of The New York Times was less positive:

Just why and for what particular purpose Logan makes his run is anything but clear after you've sat through nearly two hours of this stuff. Logan's Run is less interested in logic than in gadgets and spectacle, but these are sometimes jazzily effective and even poetic. Had more attention been paid to the screenplay, the movie might have been a stunner.

Gene Siskel of the Chicago Tribune gave the film zero stars out of four, calling it "unquestionably the worst major motion picture I've seen this year". He described the technological gadgets as "lackluster" and the script "loaded with stupidities that had a preview audience laughing in derision". What he found "most contemptible is the way the film never justifies any of its characters' behavior. Jessica's subversive group doesn't do anything except hide in what looks like a boiler room. The main story of Logan's flight consists of a simple fistfight". He concluded, "Logan's Run is an artistic con job from beginning to end".

New York was also negative, writing that the film was "yet another of those tiresome world-after-the-holocaust bits" and "hardly a hop for your money". However, the review complimented York and Agutter as "gifted".

Charles Champlin of the Los Angeles Times was mixed, writing that "its visual razzle-dazzle ... propels Logan's Run past some foolish concocting, indifferent acting, slow pacing and uncertain toning".

In 2000, Ian Nathan wrote in Empire that the film "can't escape its '70s origins", but contains "warnings about decadence, ageism, and allowing technology and science to run riot, done to a disco groove". In his 2015 Movie Guide, Leonard Maltin gave the film two stars, finding the first half "dazzling" and the second "dreary". In 2015, Rolling Stone named it 27th among the 50 Best Sci-Fi Movies of the 1970s. The film has a 58% approval rating on Rotten Tomatoes, based on 36 reviews. The site's consensus reads: "Logan's Run overcomes its campier elements and undercooked plot with a bounty of rousing ideas and dashing sci-fi adventure". On Metacritic it has a score of 53% based on reviews from 9 critics, indicating "mixed or average" reviews.

Inverse writer Ryan Britt argued in 2023 that the film is superior to the novel, which he notes won no awards and is not highly regarded by science fiction enthusiasts. He granted that the story's premise, which he attributes to speculation as to what the world might become if the youth of the late 1960s did, in fact, run it, "hasn't aged well". But the film streamlines the plot by limiting Logan's and Jessica's odyssey across North America and eliminating their ultimate escape to Sanctuary, in orbit around Mars, in favor of their return to the city, where they tell everyone they can live past 30 and begin the process of reforming their society. "For this reason alone, Logan's Run will live on as a movie rather than a book", Britt concludes. "In writing the screenplay, what David Zelag Goodman understood was something Johnson and Nolan overlooked ... At some point, [the story] can't just be about running away."

=== Accolades ===
At the Academy Awards, the film won a Special Academy Award for visual effects, tied with the 1976 remake of King Kong, indicating that Logan's Run made its mark in visual and special effects for which few previous science fiction films had a sufficient budget. Logan's Run was very popular at the Saturn Awards, winning the six awards, including Best Science Fiction Film. The film was also in competition for the Golden Prize at the 10th Moscow International Film Festival.

Award	Date of ceremony	Category	Recipients	Result	Ref.
Academy Awards	March 28, 1977	Best Art Direction	Dale Hennesy and Robert De Vestel	Nominated	
Academy Awards	March 28, 1977	Best Cinematography	Ernest Laszlo	Nominated	
Academy Awards	March 28, 1977	Special Achievement Award (for visual effects)	L.B. Abbott, Glen Robinson and Matthew Yuricich	Won	
Hugo Awards	September 2 – 5, 1977	Best Dramatic Presentation	Michael Anderson	Nominated	
Nebula Awards	April 30, 1977	Best Script	David Zelag Goodman	Nominated	
Saturn Award	January 15, 1977	Best Science Fiction Film	Logan's Run	Won	
Saturn Award	January 15, 1977	Best Cinematography	Ernest Laszlo	Won	
Saturn Award	January 15, 1977	Best Art Direction	Dale Hennesy	Won	
Saturn Award	January 15, 1977	Best Set Decoration	Robert De Vestel	Won	
Saturn Award	January 15, 1977	Best Costumes	Bill Thomas	Won	
Saturn Award	January 15, 1977	Best Make-Up	William J. Tuttle	Won	

== Legacy ==
Inspired by the film's success with young viewers, CBS and MGM Television paid Nolan $9 million to base a television series on the film. The resulting series, Logan's Run, starring Gregory Harrison and Heather Menzies, began with Logan and Jessica escaping the domed city, then showed them encountering various obstacles in their quest to find Sanctuary. The series debuted in September 1977, and ran for 14 episodes before being cancelled. MGM had also expressed interest in adapting Nolan's sequel novel Logan's World, but Saul David had opted to focus on the television series instead.

Marvel Comics published a short-lived comic book series in 1977, with George Pérez drawing five issues between January and May 1977, with "acceptable" sales. The comics adapted the film's story in five issues and briefly continued beyond but was ended when Marvel realized they only had the rights to adapt the movie and not to continue beyond. In his art, Pérez sought to follow the art direction of the film. The book was cancelled after issue #7 in July 1977 on a cliffhanger.

A potential remake of the film, or second adaptation of the novel, has been under development since the mid-1990s by producer Joel Silver and Warner Bros., which owns the film rights. Directors who have been attached to the remake since then include Skip Woods, Bryan Singer, Joseph Kosinski, Carl Erik Rinsch, Nicolas Winding Refn and Simon Kinberg. Screenwriters attached to the film, who in some cases wrote a screenplay, include Ethan Gross and Paul Todisco, Dan Harris, Christopher McQuarrie, Alex Garland, Andrew Baldwin, Ken Levine and Peter Craig. Various directors have stated that they wished to make a film adaptation that was closer to the novel than the original film had been; conversely, in 2015 the idea was floated to give the remake a female lead, based on the success of the female-driven dystopian Hunger Games and Divergent film series. In 2021, the blog Gizmodo speculated that the remake project was dead for the foreseeable future, after Silver, who had spearheaded the project throughout, resigned from his own production company in 2019.

In 2000, Roger Joseph Manning Jr. and Brian Reitzell released an electronica album called Logan's Sanctuary, conceived as the soundtrack for an imagined sequel to Logan's Run.
