= Fort Worth Water Gardens =

Fountain-themed urban park in Texas, US

Coordinates: 32°44′52″N 97°19′36″W

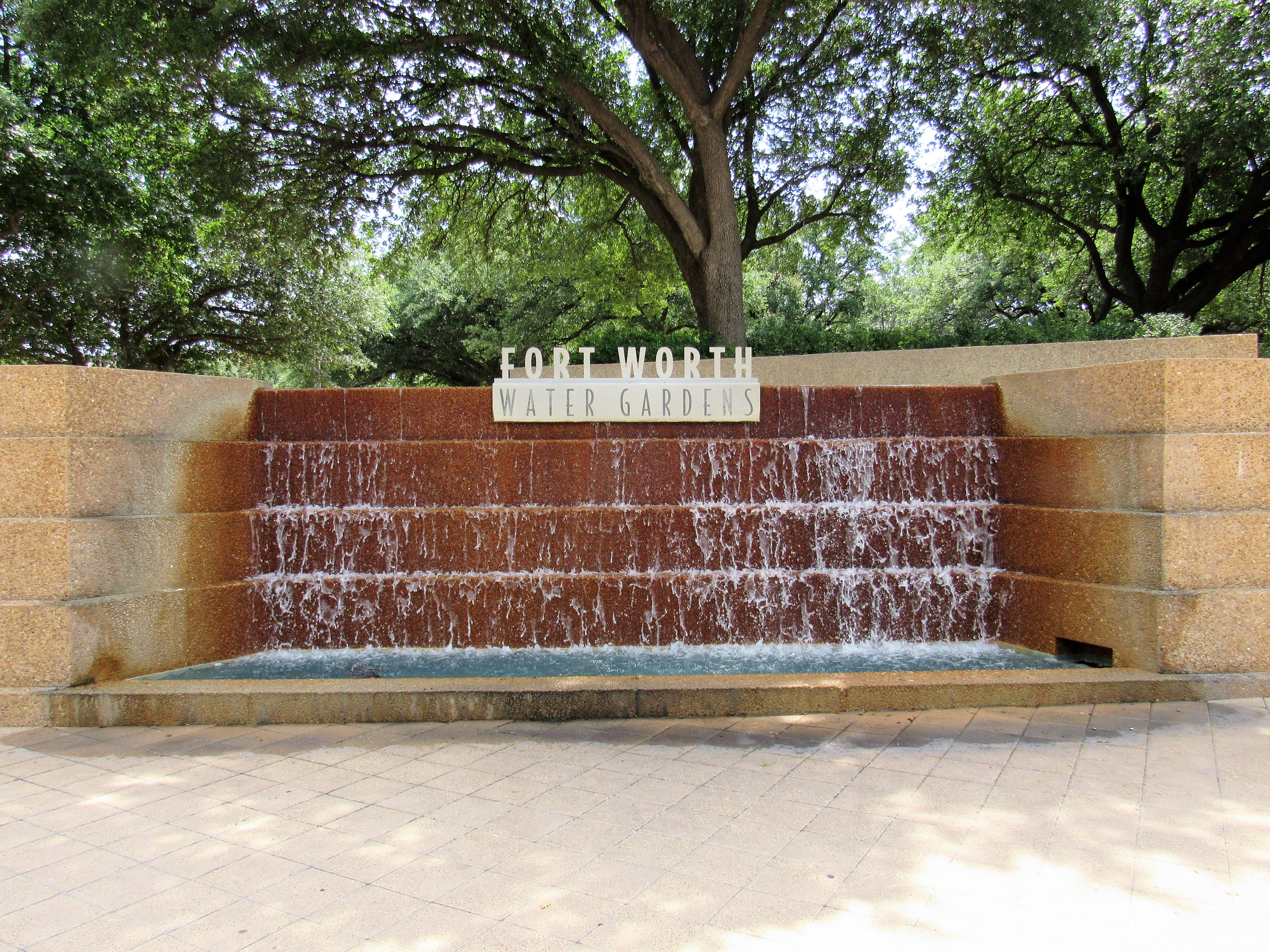
Fort Worth Water Gardens

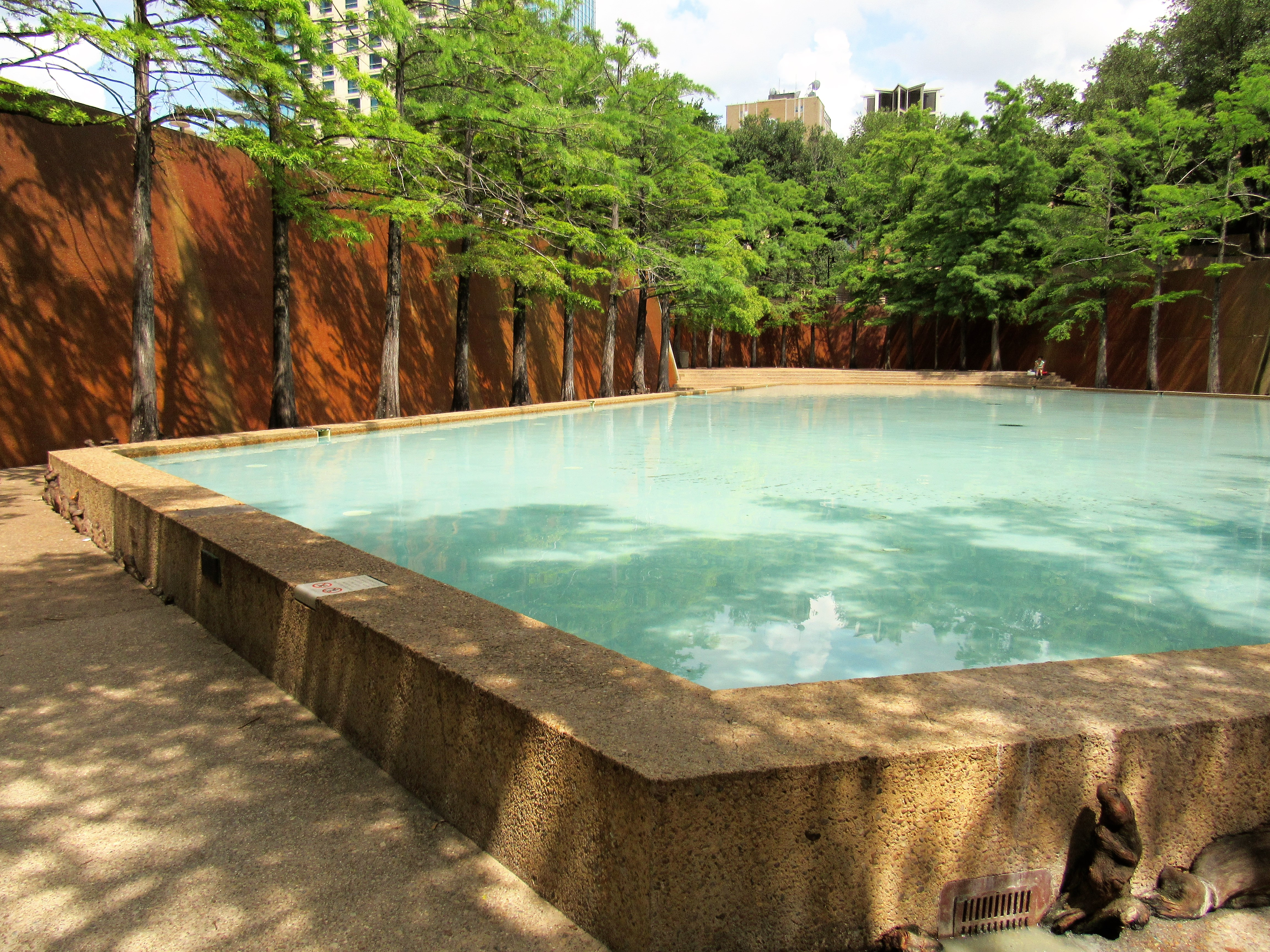
The Quiet Pool

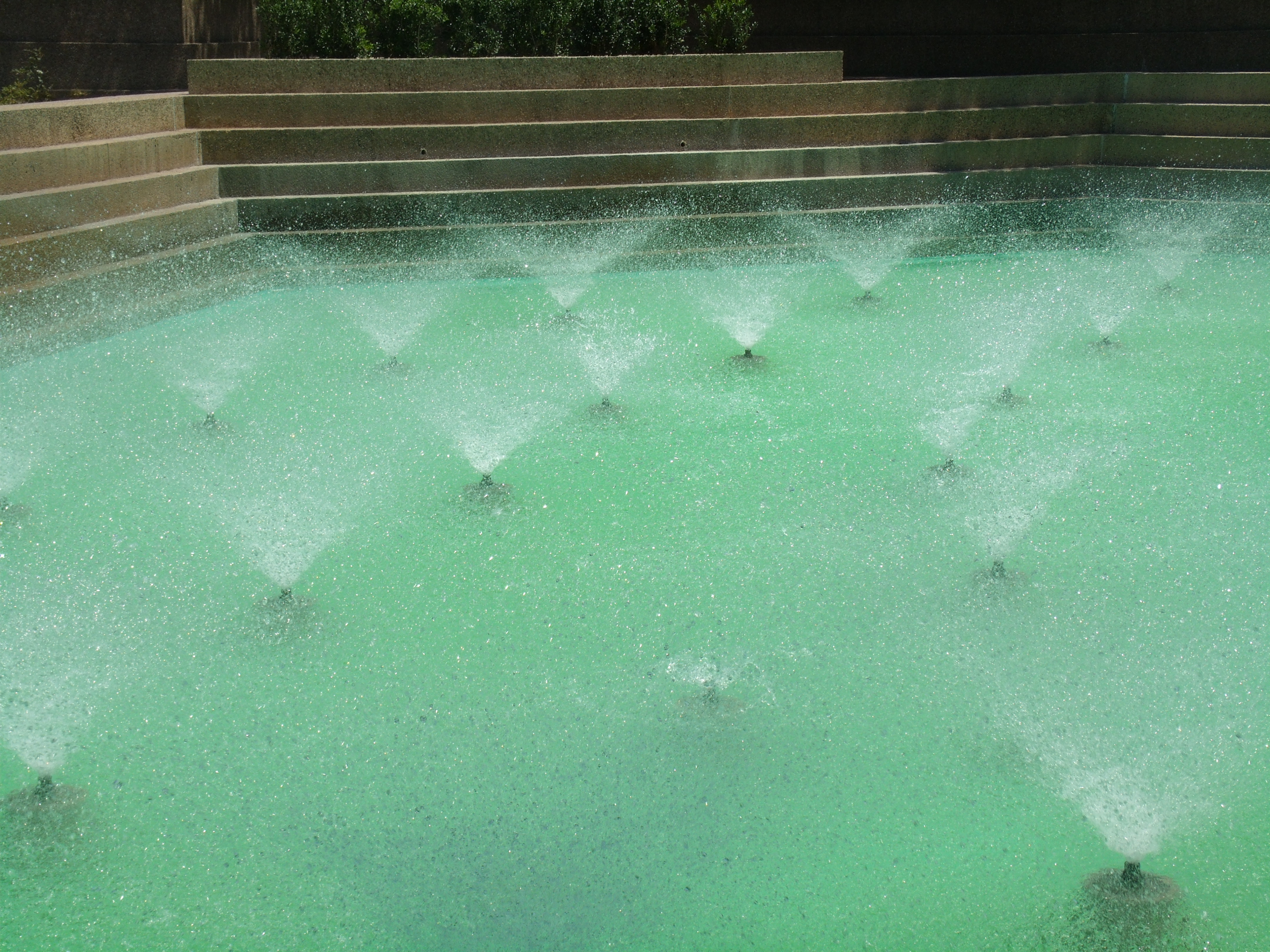
The Aerated Pool

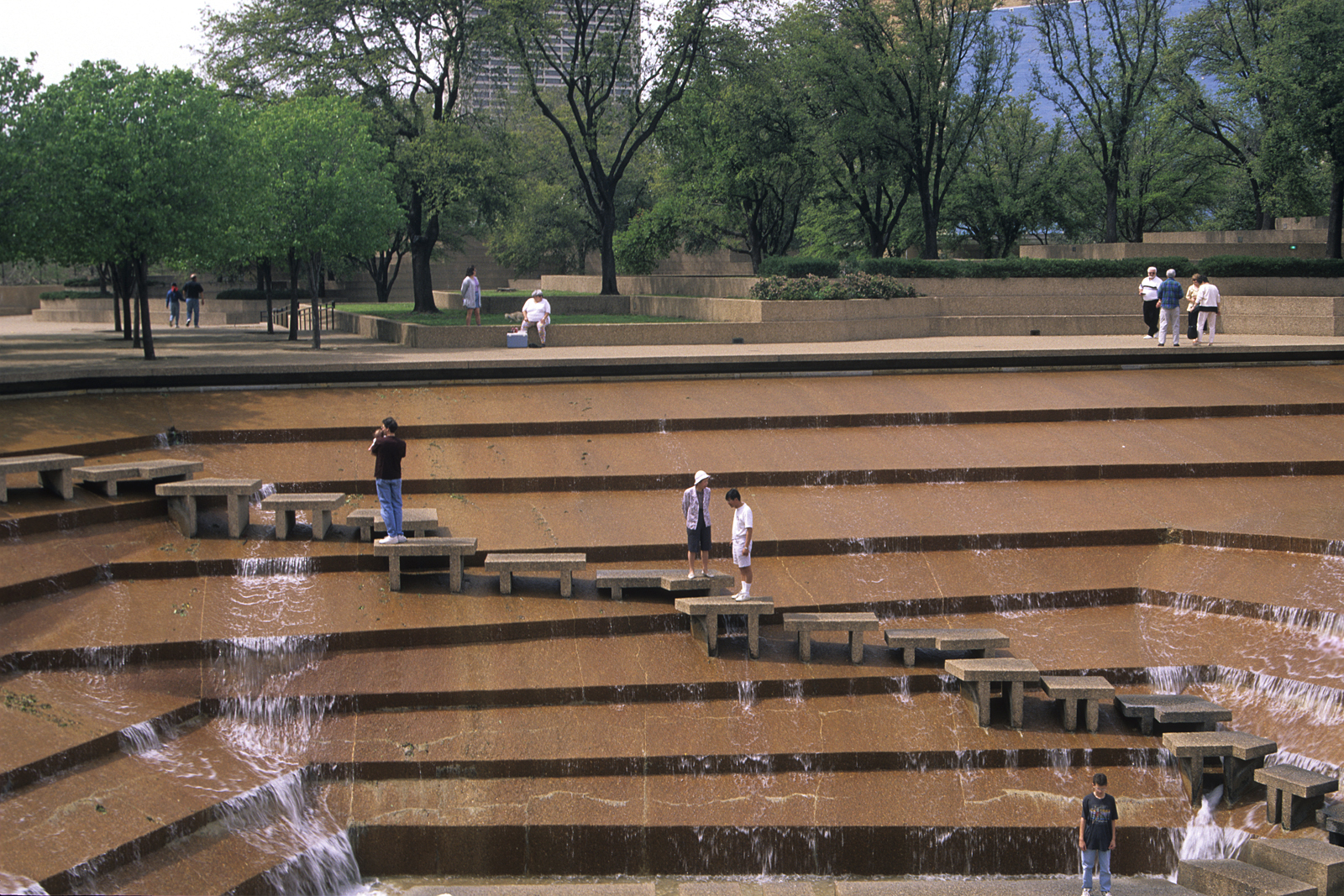
The Active Pool

Video of the Water Gardens. View from the center of the main waterfall area.

The Fort Worth Water Gardens is an urban park located on the south end of downtown Fort Worth. It covers 4.3-acres (1.7 hectares) between Houston and Commerce Streets next to the Fort Worth Convention Center. The Water Gardens were built in 1974, designed by noted New York architects Philip Johnson and John Burgee, and were dedicated to the City of Fort Worth by the Amon G. Carter Foundation.

The focal points of the park are three pools of water. The Quiet Pool is encircled with cypress trees and towering walls that are covered in thin planes of water that cascade almost 90 degrees down to the sunken blue water feature. The Aerated Pool features multiple illuminated spray fountains under a canopy of large oak trees. The Active Pool is the main attraction of the Water Gardens, and has water cascading 38 feet (11 m) down terraces and steps into a small pool at the bottom.

The park is frequently billed as a "cooling oasis in the concrete jungle" of downtown. A terraced knoll helps to shield it from the rest of the City. Interstate 30 was relocated from its former site immediately adjacent to the Water Gardens, making the south end of the park quieter. The park is now situated adjacent to Lancaster Avenue.

== Accidents ==
On March 21, 1991, Larry James Watkins, 43, of Greensboro, North Carolina, was one of two people killed when an 80-foot tall light pole toppled at about 6 p.m. in gusty winds. Two other people — one from Mississippi, the other from California — were injured.

Libby Watson, an assistant Fort Worth city manager, said the following day that investigators had not determined what caused the metal pole to snap at the base and fall. She said, though, that the wind may have contributed. "I'm afraid it's too early to speculate on the cause", she said. A South Carolina man also was killed by the falling pole.

The pole was one of six at Fort Worth Water Garden. The park was closed following the accident.

The park was temporarily closed to the public after four people died there on June 16, 2004. Juantrice Deadmon, 11, Myron Dukes, 35; his daughter Lauren, 8; and his son Christopher, 13, were drowned after being pulled down by the pumps at the center of the Active Pool. Witnesses saw Lauren fall into the water, with Juantrice falling after her while trying to rescue Lauren. Christopher and Myron jumped into the water after the girls in an attempted rescue. The four were members of Antioch Missionary Baptist Church in Chicago, and were visiting Fort Worth for the National Baptist Sunday School and Baptist Training Union Congress. Bicycle police and firemen arrived at the scene within two minutes of receiving a call at 6:45 p.m. Attempts at rescue were unsuccessful due to the sheer strength of the suction of the whirlpool. Later reports revealed that the water depth had been increased to 9 feet to keep the pumps working properly in spite of litter and tree debris that had created a 50 percent blockage of the screens covering the pool's drain. The recommended depth of the pool was 3 feet. Memos dating back to 1974 noted that escape would be practically impossible without adequate help should one fall into the pool.

On Thursday, June 17, conference attendees and church members held a vigil for the victims near the Water Gardens. Funeral services for the three members of the Dukes family were held on Thursday, June 24. Representatives from Chicago and Fort Worth were part of the 2,000 people in attendance, including Mayor Mike Moncrief. Services for Juantrice were held the following day.

The park reopened March 4, 2007, after modifications that reduced the depth of the main pool from 9 ft (2.7 m) to 2 ft (0.61 m) and addressed other issues.

== In popular culture ==
- Scenes in the 1976 film Logan's Run were filmed in the active pool at the Water Gardens in July 1975.
- The pool is also featured briefly at the end of the 1979 television adaptation of The Lathe of Heaven.
- The pool is featured in several music videos by popular artists, including singer-songwriter Solange's music video for her 2019 song "Almeda", and rapper Kendrick Lamar's music video for his 2022 song "N95".

== See also ==
- History of fountains in the United States
