= Saturn Award for Best Director =

Annual US film award

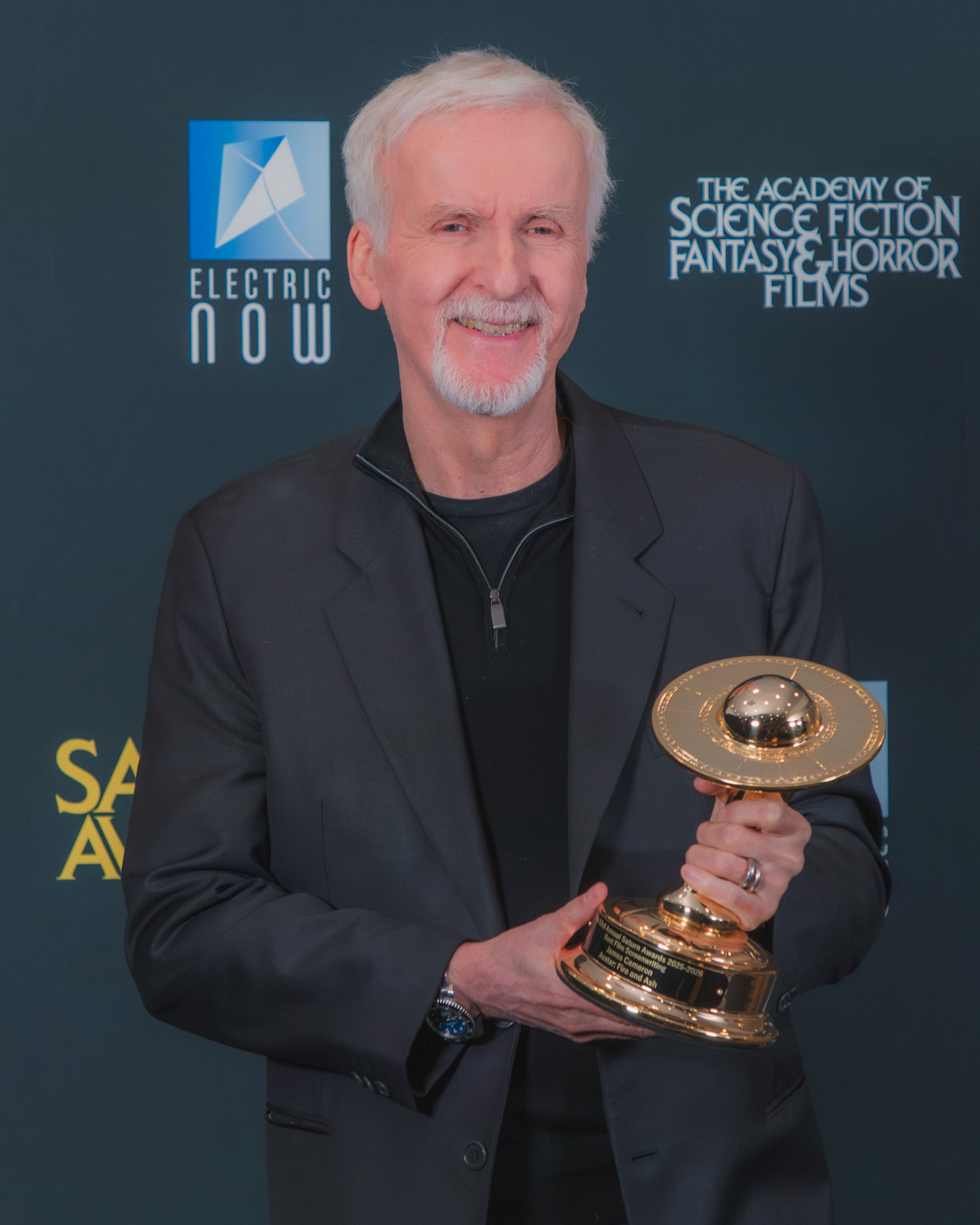
- The 2025 recipient: James Cameron
- Awarded for: Best directing of the year for a genre film
- Country: United States
- Presented by: Academy of Science Fiction, Fantasy and Horror Films
- First award: 1974/1975
- Currently held by: James Cameron for Avatar: Fire and Ash (2024/2025)
- Website: www.saturnawards.org

The Saturn Award for Best Director (or Saturn Award for Best Direction) is one of the annual awards given by the Academy of Science Fiction, Fantasy and Horror Films. The Saturn Awards, which are the oldest film-specialized awards to reward genre fiction achievements, in particular for science fiction, fantasy, and horror (the Hugo Award for Best Dramatic Presentation is the oldest award for science fiction and fantasy films), included the Best Director category for the first time at the 3rd Saturn Awards, for the 1974/1975 film years.

== History ==
The award is also the oldest to honor film directors in science fiction, fantasy and horror. It has been given 36 times, including a tie for the 1977 film year.

James Cameron holds the record of the most wins with seven (for eight nominations), while Steven Spielberg is the most nominated director with fourteen nominations (for four wins). Only three other directors have won the award more than once: Peter Jackson (three times), Bryan Singer and Ridley Scott (two times). As of 2026, Cameron is the only director to have won the award two years in a row (having won at both the 17th and 18th ceremonies for The Abyss and Terminator 2: Judgment Day, respectively). Spielberg is the only director to win at least one award in four consecutive decades, while Cameron has won awards in four non consecutive decades and is the only director to win multiple awards in multiple decades (winning two in the 80s, 90s, and 20s).

At the 22nd Saturn Awards, Kathryn Bigelow became the first woman to win the award, and is one of three female directors to win the award (the others being Lana and Lily Wachowski). Roland Emmerich became the first of four LGBTQ person to win the award at the 23rd ceremony (the others being the Wachowskis and Singer). To date the Wachowskis are the only transgender filmmakers to win the award, but were not out as such at the time of their victory. John Woo became the first person of Asian descent to win the award at the 24th ceremony and Ryan Coogler became the first African-American to win the award at the 44th ceremony.

== Winners and nominees ==
=== 1970s ===
Year	Director	Film
1974/1975 (3rd)	Mel Brooks	Young Frankenstein
1976 (4th)	Dan Curtis	Burnt Offerings
1977 (5th)	George Lucas	Star Wars
1977 (5th)	Steven Spielberg	Close Encounters of the Third Kind
1977 (5th)	Nicolas Gessner	The Little Girl Who Lives Down the Lane
1977 (5th)	Carl Reiner	Oh, God!
1977 (5th)	Don Taylor	The Island of Dr. Moreau
1978 (6th)	Philip Kaufman	Invasion of the Body Snatchers
1978 (6th)	Warren Beatty and Buck Henry	Heaven Can Wait
1978 (6th)	Richard Donner	Superman
1978 (6th)	Robin Hardy	The Wicker Man
1978 (6th)	Franklin J. Schaffner	The Boys from Brazil
1979 (7th)	Ridley Scott	Alien
1979 (7th)	John Badham	Dracula
1979 (7th)	Nicholas Meyer	Time After Time
1979 (7th)	Peter Weir	The Last Wave
1979 (7th)	Robert Wise	Star Trek: The Motion Picture

=== 1980s ===
Year	Director	Film
1980 (8th)	Irvin Kershner	The Empire Strikes Back
1980 (8th)	Brian De Palma	Dressed to Kill
1980 (8th)	Stanley Kubrick	The Shining
1980 (8th)	Ken Russell	Altered States
1980 (8th)	Vernon Zimmerman	Fade to Black
1981 (9th)	Steven Spielberg	Raiders of the Lost Ark
1981 (9th)	John Boorman	Excalibur
1981 (9th)	John Carpenter	Escape from New York
1981 (9th)	Terry Gilliam	Time Bandits
1981 (9th)	Michael Wadleigh	Wolfen
1982 (10th)	Nicholas Meyer	Star Trek II: The Wrath of Khan
1982 (10th)	Tobe Hooper	Poltergeist
1982 (10th)	George Miller	Mad Max 2
1982 (10th)	Ridley Scott	Blade Runner
1982 (10th)	Steven Spielberg	E.T. the Extra-Terrestrial
1983 (11th)	John Badham	WarGames
1983 (11th)	Woody Allen	Zelig
1983 (11th)	David Cronenberg	The Dead Zone
1983 (11th)	Richard Marquand	Return of the Jedi
1983 (11th)	Douglas Trumbull	Brainstorm
1984 (12th)	Joe Dante	Gremlins
1984 (12th)	James Cameron	The Terminator
1984 (12th)	Ron Howard	Splash
1984 (12th)	Leonard Nimoy	Star Trek III: The Search for Spock
1984 (12th)	Steven Spielberg	Indiana Jones and the Temple of Doom
1985 (13th)	Ron Howard	Cocoon
1985 (13th)	Woody Allen	The Purple Rose of Cairo
1985 (13th)	Tom Holland	Fright Night
1985 (13th)	George Miller	Mad Max Beyond Thunderdome
1985 (13th)	Dan O'Bannon	The Return of the Living Dead
1985 (13th)	Robert Zemeckis	Back to the Future
1986 (14th)	James Cameron	Aliens
1986 (14th)	John Badham	Short Circuit
1986 (14th)	David Cronenberg	The Fly
1986 (14th)	Randal Kleiser	Flight of the Navigator
1986 (14th)	Leonard Nimoy	Star Trek IV: The Voyage Home
1987 (15th)	Paul Verhoeven	RoboCop
1987 (15th)	Kathryn Bigelow	Near Dark
1987 (15th)	Joe Dante	Innerspace
1987 (15th)	William Dear	Harry and the Hendersons
1987 (15th)	Jack Sholder	The Hidden
1987 (15th)	Stan Winston	Pumpkinhead
1988 (16th)	Robert Zemeckis	Who Framed Roger Rabbit
1988 (16th)	Tim Burton	Beetlejuice
1988 (16th)	Renny Harlin	A Nightmare on Elm Street 4: The Dream Master
1988 (16th)	Anthony Hickox	Waxwork
1988 (16th)	Penny Marshall	Big
1988 (16th)	Charles Matthau	Doin' Time on Planet Earth
1989/1990 (17th)	James Cameron	The Abyss
1989/1990 (17th)	Clive Barker	Nightbreed
1989/1990 (17th)	Joe Dante	Gremlins 2: The New Batch
1989/1990 (17th)	Alejandro Jodorowsky	Santa Sangre
1989/1990 (17th)	Frank Marshall	Arachnophobia
1989/1990 (17th)	Sam Raimi	Darkman
1989/1990 (17th)	Paul Verhoeven	Total Recall
1989/1990 (17th)	Robert Zemeckis	Back to the Future Part III
1989/1990 (17th)	Jerry Zucker	Ghost

=== 1990s ===
Year	Director	Film
1991 (18th)	James Cameron	Terminator 2: Judgment Day
1991 (18th)	Roger Corman	Frankenstein Unbound
1991 (18th)	William Dear	If Looks Could Kill
1991 (18th)	Jonathan Demme	The Silence of the Lambs
1991 (18th)	Terry Gilliam	The Fisher King
1991 (18th)	Eric Red	Body Parts
1992 (19th)	Francis Ford Coppola	Bram Stoker's Dracula
1992 (19th)	Tim Burton	Batman Returns
1992 (19th)	David Fincher	Alien 3
1992 (19th)	William Friedkin	Rampage
1992 (19th)	Randal Kleiser	Honey, I Blew Up the Kid
1992 (19th)	Paul Verhoeven	Basic Instinct
1992 (19th)	Robert Zemeckis	Death Becomes Her
1993 (20th)	Steven Spielberg	Jurassic Park
1993 (20th)	John McTiernan	Last Action Hero
1993 (20th)	Harold Ramis	Groundhog Day
1993 (20th)	George A. Romero	The Dark Half
1993 (20th)	Henry Selick	The Nightmare Before Christmas
1993 (20th)	Ron Underwood	Heart and Souls
1993 (20th)	John Woo	Hard Target
1994 (21st)	James Cameron	True Lies
1994 (21st)	William Dear	Angels in the Outfield
1994 (21st)	Jan de Bont	Speed
1994 (21st)	Neil Jordan	Interview with the Vampire
1994 (21st)	Alex Proyas	The Crow
1994 (21st)	Robert Zemeckis	Forrest Gump
1995 (22nd)	Kathryn Bigelow	Strange Days
1995 (22nd)	David Fincher	Seven
1995 (22nd)	Terry Gilliam	12 Monkeys
1995 (22nd)	Joe Johnston	Jumanji
1995 (22nd)	Frank Marshall	Congo
1995 (22nd)	Robert Rodriguez	From Dusk till Dawn
1995 (22nd)	Bryan Singer	The Usual Suspects
1996 (23rd)	Roland Emmerich	Independence Day
1996 (23rd)	Tim Burton	Mars Attacks!
1996 (23rd)	Joel Coen	Fargo
1996 (23rd)	Wes Craven	Scream
1996 (23rd)	Jonathan Frakes	Star Trek: First Contact
1996 (23rd)	Peter Jackson	The Frighteners
1997 (24th)	John Woo	Face/Off
1997 (24th)	Jean-Pierre Jeunet	Alien: Resurrection
1997 (24th)	Barry Sonnenfeld	Men in Black
1997 (24th)	Steven Spielberg	The Lost World: Jurassic Park
1997 (24th)	Paul Verhoeven	Starship Troopers
1997 (24th)	Robert Zemeckis	Contact
1998 (25th)	Michael Bay	Armageddon
1998 (25th)	Rob Bowman	The X-Files
1998 (25th)	Roland Emmerich	Godzilla
1998 (25th)	Alex Proyas	Dark City
1998 (25th)	Bryan Singer	Apt Pupil
1998 (25th)	Peter Weir	The Truman Show
1999 (26th)	The Wachowskis	The Matrix
1999 (26th)	Tim Burton	Sleepy Hollow
1999 (26th)	Frank Darabont	The Green Mile
1999 (26th)	George Lucas	Star Wars: Episode I – The Phantom Menace
1999 (26th)	Dean Parisot	Galaxy Quest
1999 (26th)	Stephen Sommers	The Mummy

=== 2000s ===
Year	Director	Film
2000 (27th)	Bryan Singer	X-Men
2000 (27th)	Clint Eastwood	Space Cowboys
2000 (27th)	Ron Howard	How the Grinch Stole Christmas
2000 (27th)	Ang Lee	Crouching Tiger, Hidden Dragon
2000 (27th)	Ridley Scott	Gladiator
2000 (27th)	Robert Zemeckis	What Lies Beneath
2001 (28th)	Peter Jackson	The Lord of the Rings: The Fellowship of the Ring
2001 (28th)	Alejandro Amenábar	The Others
2001 (28th)	Chris Columbus	Harry Potter and the Philosopher's Stone
2001 (28th)	Christophe Gans	Brotherhood of the Wolf
2001 (28th)	David Lynch	Mulholland Drive
2001 (28th)	Steven Spielberg	A.I. Artificial Intelligence
2002 (29th)	Steven Spielberg	Minority Report
2002 (29th)	Chris Columbus	Harry Potter and the Chamber of Secrets
2002 (29th)	Peter Jackson	The Lord of the Rings: The Two Towers
2002 (29th)	George Lucas	Star Wars: Episode II – Attack of the Clones
2002 (29th)	Bill Paxton	Frailty
2002 (29th)	Sam Raimi	Spider-Man
2003 (30th)	Peter Jackson	The Lord of the Rings: The Return of the King
2003 (30th)	Danny Boyle	28 Days Later
2003 (30th)	Bryan Singer	X2
2003 (30th)	Quentin Tarantino	Kill Bill: Volume 1
2003 (30th)	Gore Verbinski	Pirates of the Caribbean: The Curse of the Black Pearl
2003 (30th)	Edward Zwick	The Last Samurai
2004 (31st)	Sam Raimi	Spider-Man 2
2004 (31st)	Alfonso Cuarón	Harry Potter and the Prisoner of Azkaban
2004 (31st)	Michel Gondry	Eternal Sunshine of the Spotless Mind
2004 (31st)	Michael Mann	Collateral
2004 (31st)	Quentin Tarantino	Kill Bill: Volume 2
2004 (31st)	Zhang Yimou	House of Flying Daggers
2005 (32nd)	Peter Jackson	King Kong
2005 (32nd)	Andrew Adamson	The Chronicles of Narnia: The Lion, the Witch and the Wardrobe
2005 (32nd)	George Lucas	Star Wars: Episode III – Revenge of the Sith
2005 (32nd)	Mike Newell	Harry Potter and the Goblet of Fire
2005 (32nd)	Christopher Nolan	Batman Begins
2005 (32nd)	Steven Spielberg	War of the Worlds
2006 (33rd)	Bryan Singer	Superman Returns
2006 (33rd)	J. J. Abrams	Mission: Impossible III
2006 (33rd)	Alfonso Cuarón	Children of Men
2006 (33rd)	Guillermo del Toro	Pan's Labyrinth
2006 (33rd)	Mel Gibson	Apocalypto
2006 (33rd)	Tom Tykwer	Perfume: The Story of a Murderer
2007 (34th)	Zack Snyder	300
2007 (34th)	Tim Burton	Sweeney Todd: The Demon Barber of Fleet Street
2007 (34th)	Frank Darabont	The Mist
2007 (34th)	Paul Greengrass	The Bourne Ultimatum
2007 (34th)	Sam Raimi	Spider-Man 3
2007 (34th)	David Yates	Harry Potter and the Order of the Phoenix
2008 (35th)	Jon Favreau	Iron Man
2008 (35th)	Clint Eastwood	Changeling
2008 (35th)	David Fincher	The Curious Case of Benjamin Button
2008 (35th)	Christopher Nolan	The Dark Knight
2008 (35th)	Bryan Singer	Valkyrie
2008 (35th)	Steven Spielberg	Indiana Jones and the Kingdom of the Crystal Skull
2008 (35th)	Andrew Stanton	WALL-E
2009 (36th)	James Cameron	Avatar
2009 (36th)	J. J. Abrams	Star Trek
2009 (36th)	Kathryn Bigelow	The Hurt Locker
2009 (36th)	Neill Blomkamp	District 9
2009 (36th)	Guy Ritchie	Sherlock Holmes
2009 (36th)	Zack Snyder	Watchmen
2009 (36th)	Quentin Tarantino	Inglourious Basterds

=== 2010s ===
Year	Director	Film
2010 (37th)	Christopher Nolan	Inception
2010 (37th)	Darren Aronofsky	Black Swan
2010 (37th)	Clint Eastwood	Hereafter
2010 (37th)	Matt Reeves	Let Me In
2010 (37th)	Martin Scorsese	Shutter Island
2010 (37th)	David Yates	Harry Potter and the Deathly Hallows – Part 1
2011 (38th)	J. J. Abrams	Super 8
2011 (38th)	Brad Bird	Mission: Impossible – Ghost Protocol
2011 (38th)	Martin Scorsese	Hugo
2011 (38th)	Steven Spielberg	The Adventures of Tintin: The Secret of the Unicorn
2011 (38th)	Rupert Wyatt	Rise of the Planet of the Apes
2011 (38th)	David Yates	Harry Potter and the Deathly Hallows – Part 2
2012 (39th)	Joss Whedon	The Avengers
2012 (39th)	William Friedkin	Killer Joe
2012 (39th)	Peter Jackson	The Hobbit: An Unexpected Journey
2012 (39th)	Rian Johnson	Looper
2012 (39th)	Ang Lee	Life of Pi
2012 (39th)	Christopher Nolan	The Dark Knight Rises
2013 (40th)	Alfonso Cuarón	Gravity
2013 (40th)	J. J. Abrams	Star Trek Into Darkness
2013 (40th)	Peter Berg	Lone Survivor
2013 (40th)	Guillermo del Toro	Pacific Rim
2013 (40th)	Peter Jackson	The Hobbit: The Desolation of Smaug
2013 (40th)	Francis Lawrence	The Hunger Games: Catching Fire
2014 (41st)	James Gunn	Guardians of the Galaxy
2014 (41st)	Alejandro G. Iñárritu	Birdman
2014 (41st)	Doug Liman	Edge of Tomorrow
2014 (41st)	Christopher Nolan	Interstellar
2014 (41st)	Matt Reeves	Dawn of the Planet of the Apes
2014 (41st)	Anthony and Joe Russo	Captain America: The Winter Soldier
2014 (41st)	Bryan Singer	X-Men: Days of Future Past
2015 (42nd)	Ridley Scott	The Martian
2015 (42nd)	J. J. Abrams	Star Wars: The Force Awakens
2015 (42nd)	Guillermo del Toro	Crimson Peak
2015 (42nd)	Alex Garland	Ex Machina
2015 (42nd)	George Miller	Mad Max: Fury Road
2015 (42nd)	Peyton Reed	Ant-Man
2015 (42nd)	Colin Trevorrow	Jurassic World
2016 (43rd)	Gareth Edwards	Rogue One: A Star Wars Story
2016 (43rd)	Scott Derrickson	Doctor Strange
2016 (43rd)	Jon Favreau	The Jungle Book
2016 (43rd)	Anthony and Joe Russo	Captain America: Civil War
2016 (43rd)	Bryan Singer	X-Men: Apocalypse
2016 (43rd)	Steven Spielberg	The BFG
2016 (43rd)	Denis Villeneuve	Arrival
2017 (44th)	Ryan Coogler	Black Panther
2017 (44th)	Guillermo del Toro	The Shape of Water
2017 (44th)	Patty Jenkins	Wonder Woman
2017 (44th)	Rian Johnson	Star Wars: The Last Jedi
2017 (44th)	Jordan Peele	Get Out
2017 (44th)	Matt Reeves	War for the Planet of the Apes
2017 (44th)	Denis Villeneuve	Blade Runner 2049
2018/2019 (45th)	Jordan Peele	Us
2018/2019 (45th)	Anna Boden and Ryan Fleck	Captain Marvel
2018/2019 (45th)	Karyn Kusama	Destroyer
2018/2019 (45th)	Guy Ritchie	Aladdin
2018/2019 (45th)	Anthony and Joe Russo	Avengers: Endgame
2018/2019 (45th)	Steven Spielberg	Ready Player One
2018/2019 (45th)	James Wan	Aquaman
2018/2019 (45th)	Zhang Yimou	Shadow
2019/2020 (46th)	J. J. Abrams	Star Wars: The Rise of Skywalker
2019/2020 (46th)	Niki Caro	Mulan
2019/2020 (46th)	Mike Flanagan	Doctor Sleep
2019/2020 (46th)	Christopher Nolan	Tenet
2019/2020 (46th)	Gina Prince-Bythewood	The Old Guard
2019/2020 (46th)	Quentin Tarantino	Once Upon a Time in Hollywood
2019/2020 (46th)	Leigh Whannell	The Invisible Man

=== 2020s ===
Year	Director	Film
2021/2022 (50th)	Matt Reeves	The Batman
2021/2022 (50th)	Guillermo del Toro	Nightmare Alley
2021/2022 (50th)	Joseph Kosinski	Top Gun: Maverick
2021/2022 (50th)	Jordan Peele	Nope
2021/2022 (50th)	S. S. Rajamouli	RRR
2021/2022 (50th)	Steven Spielberg	West Side Story
2021/2022 (50th)	Jon Watts	Spider-Man: No Way Home
2022/2023 (51st)	James Cameron	Avatar: The Way of Water
2022/2023 (51st)	Greta Gerwig	Barbie
2022/2023 (51st)	James Gunn	Guardians of the Galaxy Vol. 3
2022/2023 (51st)	James Mangold	Indiana Jones and the Dial of Destiny
2022/2023 (51st)	Mark Mylod	The Menu
2022/2023 (51st)	Christopher Nolan	Oppenheimer
2022/2023 (51st)	Danny and Michael Philippou	Talk to Me
2023/2024 (52nd)	Denis Villeneuve	Dune: Part Two
2023/2024 (52nd)	Fede Álvarez	Alien: Romulus
2023/2024 (52nd)	Wes Ball	Kingdom of the Planet of the Apes
2023/2024 (52nd)	Tim Burton	Beetlejuice Beetlejuice
2023/2024 (52nd)	Shawn Levy	Deadpool & Wolverine
2023/2024 (52nd)	JT Mollner	Strange Darling
2023/2024 (52nd)	Takashi Yamazaki	Godzilla: Minus One
2024/2025 (53rd)	James Cameron	Avatar: Fire and Ash
2024/2025 (53rd)	Ryan Coogler	Sinners
2024/2025 (53rd)	Guillermo del Toro	Frankenstein
2024/2025 (53rd)	James Gunn	Superman
2024/2025 (53rd)	Christopher McQuarrie	Mission: Impossible – The Final Reckoning
2024/2025 (53rd)	Matt Shakman	The Fantastic Four: First Steps
2024/2025 (53rd)	Dan Trachtenberg	Predator: Badlands

== Multiple nominations ==
14 nominations

- Steven Spielberg

8 nominations

- James Cameron
- Bryan Singer

7 nominations

- Peter Jackson
- Christopher Nolan
- Robert Zemeckis

6 nominations

- J. J. Abrams
- Tim Burton
- Guillermo del Toro

4 nominations

- George Lucas
- Sam Raimi
- Matt Reeves
- Ridley Scott
- Quentin Tarantino
- Paul Verhoeven

3 nominations

- John Badham
- Kathryn Bigelow
- Alfonso Cuarón
- Joe Dante
- William Dear
- Clint Eastwood
- David Fincher
- Terry Gilliam
- James Gunn
- Ron Howard
- George Miller
- Jordan Peele
- Anthony and Joe Russo
- Denis Villeneuve
- David Yates

2 nominations

- Woody Allen
- Chris Columbus
- Ryan Coogler
- David Cronenberg
- Frank Darabont
- Roland Emmerich
- Jon Favreau
- William Friedkin
- Rian Johnson
- Randal Kleiser
- Ang Lee
- Frank Marshall
- Nicholas Meyer
- Leonard Nimoy
- Alex Proyas
- Guy Ritchie
- Martin Scorsese
- Zack Snyder
- Peter Weir
- John Woo
- Zhang Yimou

== Multiple wins ==
7 wins

- James Cameron

4 wins

- Steven Spielberg

3 wins

- Peter Jackson

2 wins

- J. J. Abrams
- Ridley Scott
- Bryan Singer
