= Robert De Vestel =

American set decorator

- Born: January 5, 1925; California
- Died: September 30, 1997 (aged 72); Van Nuys, California
- Occupation: Set decorator
- Years active: 1965-1985

Robert Otis De Vestel (January 5, 1925 - September 30, 1997) was an American set decorator. He was nominated for two Academy Awards in the category Best Art Direction. De Vestel died on September 30, 1997, at the age of 72.

== Selected filmography ==
De Vestel was nominated for two Academy Awards for Best Art Direction:

- Tom Sawyer (1973)
- Logan's Run (1976)
- Batman series (1960's)
