= Dale Hennesy =

American production designer

- Born: August 24, 1926; Washington, D.C.
- Died: July 20, 1981 (aged 54); Encino, California
- Occupations: Production designer, art director
- Years active: 1958-1981
- Children: Carolyn Hennesy

Dale Hennesy (August 24, 1926 – July 20, 1981) was an American production designer and art director.

== Career ==
Hennesy was the son of designers and layout artists for Walt Disney. He began working in motion pictures as an illustrator at Twentieth Century Fox, including illustration work on The King and I and South Pacific.

He won the Academy Award for best art direction for Fantastic Voyage (1966), for which he created sets depicting the interior of the human body. He was also nominated for his art direction in creating the futuristic sets of Logan's Run (1976) and Annie (1982). He designed a $1-million tenement row street scene for Annie that was subsequently used in many motion pictures and was named Hennesy Street in his honor.

== Death ==
Hennesy died suddenly of an abdominal aneurysm in 1981 during production of Annie.

== Selected filmography ==
- Under the Yum Yum Tree (1963, art director)
- John Goldfarb, Please Come Home! (1964, art director)
- Good Neighbor Sam (1964, production designer)
- Fantastic Voyage (1966, art director)
- The F.B.I. (1966, art director)
- In Like Flint (1967, art director)
- Cover Me Babe (1969, art director)
- Dirty Harry (1971, art director)
- The Christian Licorice Store (1971, art director)
- Everything You Always Wanted to Know About Sex* (*But Were Afraid to Ask) (1972, production designer)
- Slither (1973, art director)
- Battle for the Planet of the Apes (1973, art director)
- Sleeper (1972, production designer)
- Time to Run (1973, production designer)
- Young Frankenstein (1974, production designer)
- Logan's Run (1976, art director)
- King Kong (1976, production designer)
- Fire in the Sky (1978, production designer)
- Who'll Stop the Rain (1978, production designer)
- Billion Dollar Threat (1979, art director)
- The Competition (1980, production designer)
- Wholly Moses! (1980, production designer)
- The Island (1980, production designer)
- Annie (1982, production designer)

== See also ==
- Art Directors Guild Hall of Fame
