= Saturn Award for Best Film =

The Saturn Awards have various Best Film categories. Saturn Award for Best Film may refer to:

- Saturn Award for Best Science Fiction Film (since 1972)
- Saturn Award for Best Horror Film (since 1972), known as Best Horror or Thriller Film from 2010 to 2012
- Saturn Award for Best Fantasy Film (since 1973)
- Saturn Award for Best Animated Film (1978, 1982, 2002–present)
- Saturn Award for Best Foreign Film (1979 only)
- Saturn Award for Best Low-Budget Film (1980–1982)
- Saturn Award for Best International Film (1980, 2006–present)
- Saturn Award for Best Action or Adventure Film (since 1994), originally Best Action/Adventure/Thriller Film from 1994 to 2010)
- Saturn Award for Best Thriller Film (since 2010), originally Best Horror or Thriller Film from 2010 to 2012
- Saturn Award for Best Independent Film (since 2012)
- Saturn Award for Best Comic-to-Film Motion Picture (since 2013)
