= 13th Saturn Awards =

US film and television award ceremony

- Date: May 28, 1986
- Site: California, U.S.

Highlights
- Most awards: Back to the Future (3); Fright Night (3)
- Most nominations: Back to the Future (9)

The 13th Saturn Awards, honoring the best in science fiction, fantasy and horror film in 1985, were held on May 28, 1986.

== Winners and nominees ==
Below is a complete list of nominees and winners. Winners are highlighted in bold.

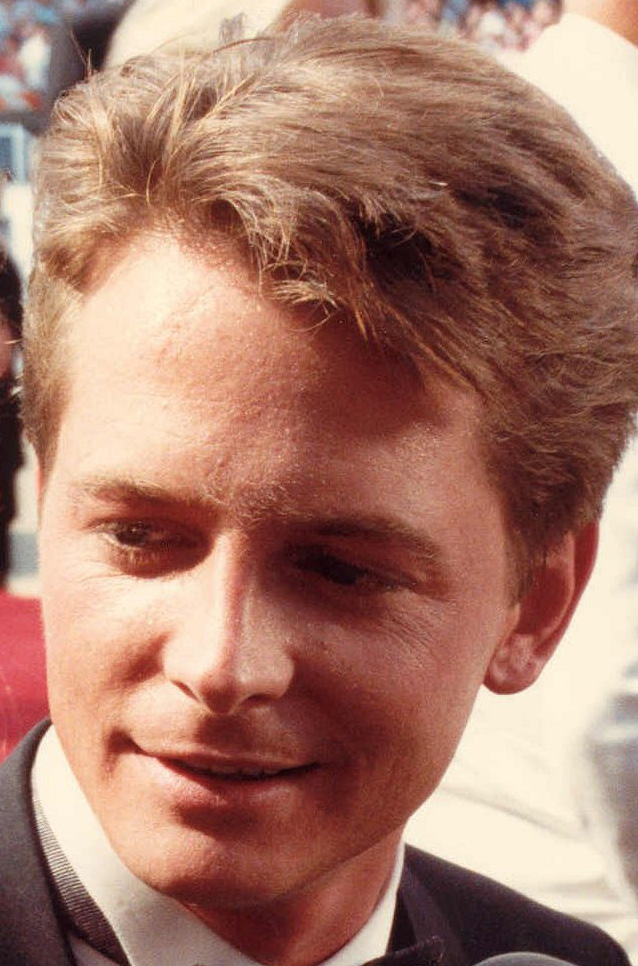
Michael J. Fox, Best Actor winner

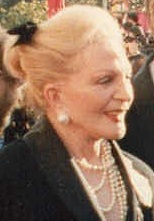
Coral Browne, Best Actress winner

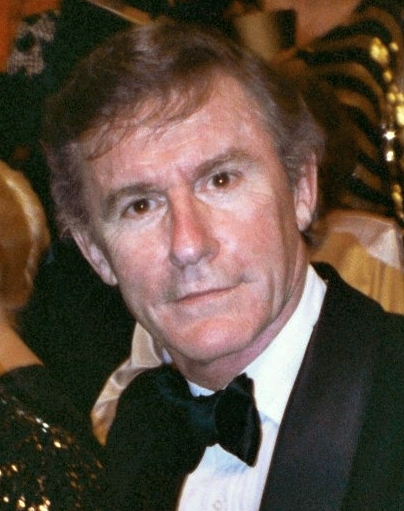
Roddy McDowall, Best Supporting Actor winner

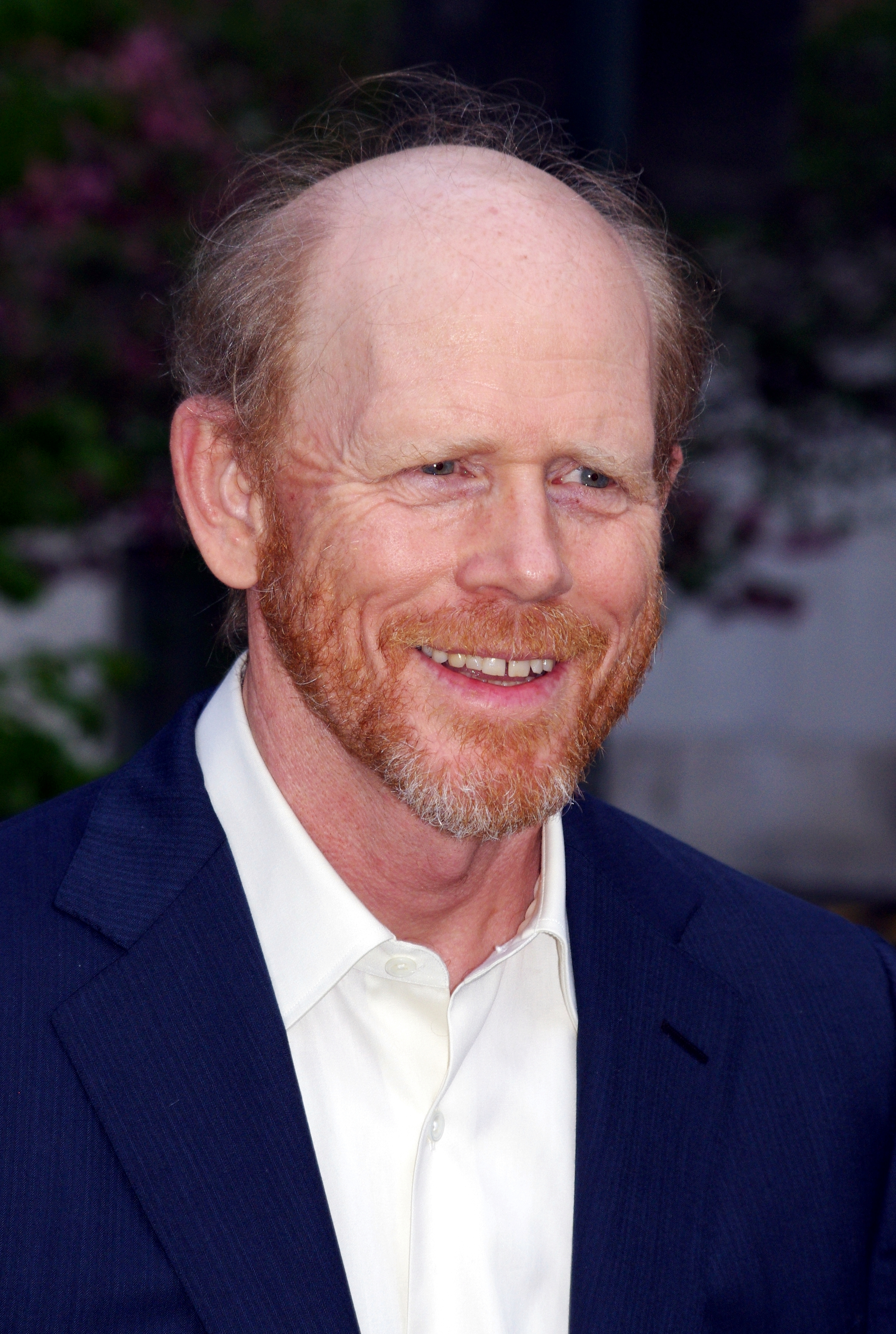
Ron Howard, Best Director winner

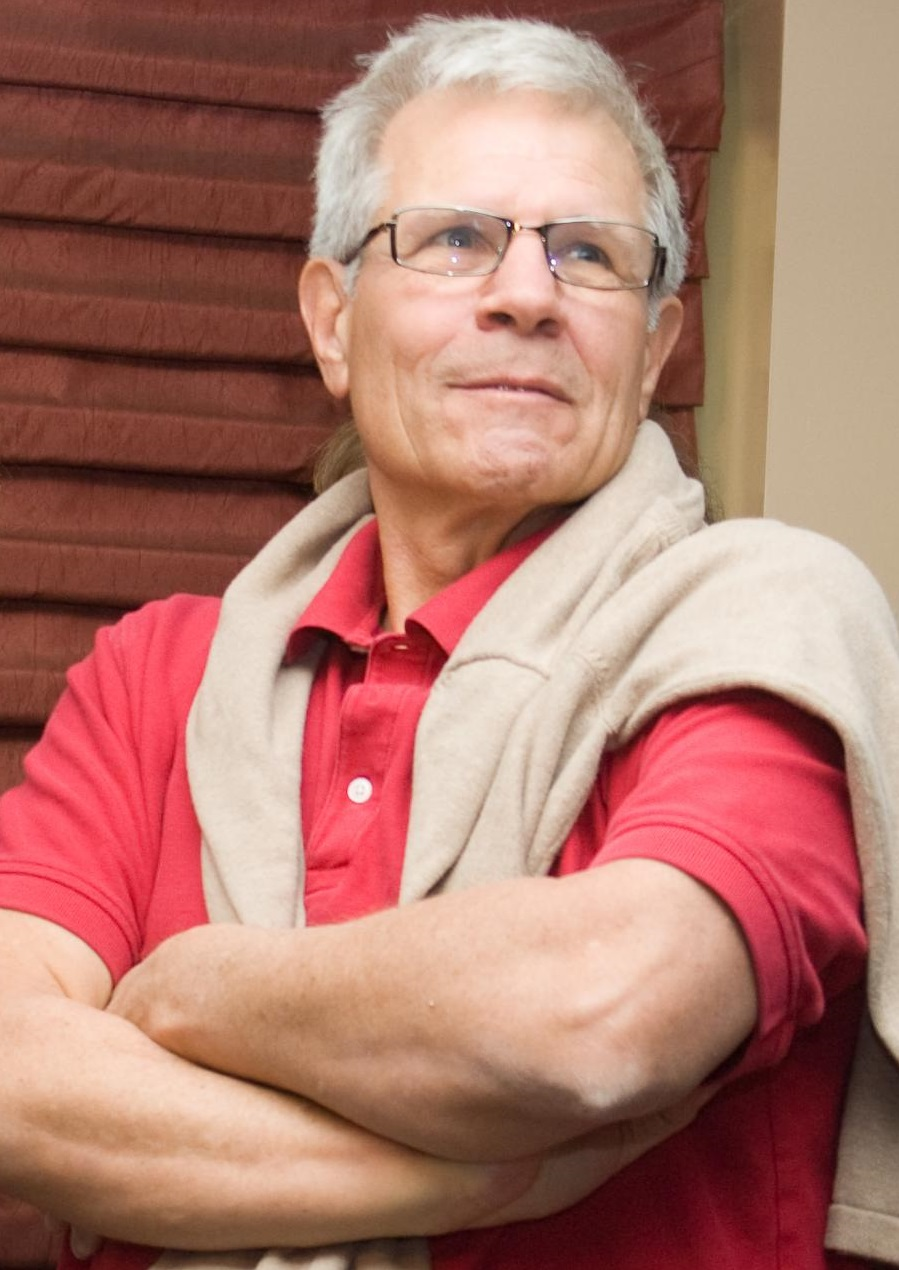
Tom Holland, Best Writing winner

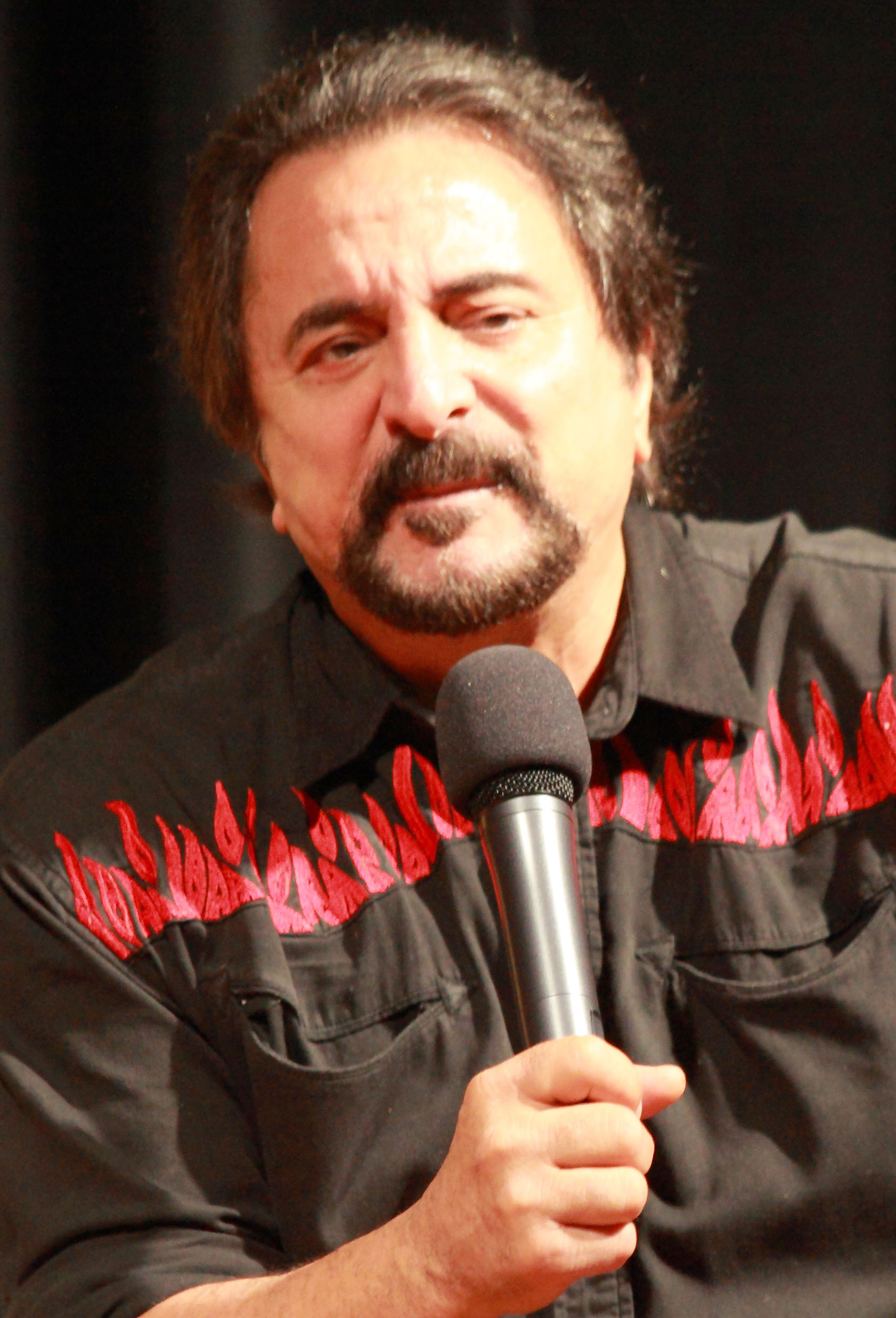
Tom Savini, Best Make-up winner

=== Film awards ===
Best Science Fiction Film	Best Fantasy Film
**Back to the Future**; Cocoon; Enemy Mine; Mad Max Beyond Thunderdome; A View to a Kill	**Ladyhawke**; The Purple Rose of Cairo; Remo Williams: The Adventure Begins; Return to Oz; Young Sherlock Holmes
Best Horror Film	Best Director
**Fright Night**; Lifeforce; A Nightmare on Elm Street 2: Freddy's Revenge; Re-Animator; The Return of the Living Dead	**Ron Howard – Cocoon**; Woody Allen – The Purple Rose of Cairo; Tom Holland – Fright Night; George Miller – Mad Max Beyond Thunderdome; Dan O'Bannon – The Return of the Living Dead; Robert Zemeckis – Back to the Future
Best Actor	Best Actress
**Michael J. Fox – Back to the Future as Marty McFly**; Hume Cronyn – Cocoon as Joe Finley; Louis Gossett Jr. – Enemy Mine as Jeriba "Jerry" Shigan; James Karen – The Return of the Living Dead as Frank; Chris Sarandon – Fright Night as Jerry Dandrige	**Coral Browne – Dreamchild as Alice Hargreaves**; Glenn Close – Maxie as Jan / Maxie; Mia Farrow – The Purple Rose of Cairo as Cecilia; Michelle Pfeiffer – Ladyhawke as Isabeau d'Anjou; Jessica Tandy – Cocoon as Alma Finley
Best Supporting Actor	Best Supporting Actress
**Roddy McDowall – Fright Night as Peter Vincent**; Joel Grey – Remo Williams: The Adventure Begins as Chiun; Crispin Glover – Back to the Future as George McFly; Ian Holm – Dreamchild as Reverend Charles L. Dodgson / Lewis Carroll; Christopher Lloyd – Back to the Future as Dr. Emmett Brown	**Anne Ramsey – The Goonies as Mama Fratelli**; Ruth Gordon – Maxie as Mrs. Lavin (posthumous); Grace Jones – A View to a Kill as May Day; Lea Thompson – Back to the Future as Lorraine Baines; Gwen Verdon – Cocoon as Bess McCarthy
Best Performance by a Younger Actor	Best Writing
**Barret Oliver – D.A.R.Y.L. as D.A.R.Y.L.**; Fairuza Balk – Return to Oz as Dorothy Gale; Jeff Cohen – The Goonies as Lawrence "Chunk" Cohen; Ilan Mitchell-Smith – Weird Science as Wyatt O'Donnelly; Amelia Shankley – Dreamchild as Little Alice	**Tom Holland – Fright Night**; Tom Benedek – Cocoon; Terry Hayes and George Miller – Mad Max Beyond Thunderdome; Woody Allen – The Purple Rose of Cairo; Chris Columbus – Young Sherlock Holmes
Best Music	Best Costumes
**Bruce Broughton – Young Sherlock Holmes**; Alan Silvestri – Back to the Future; Maurice Jarre – The Bride; James Horner – Cocoon; Andrew Powell – Ladyhawke	**Nanà Cecchi – Ladyhawke**; Deborah Lynn Scott – Back to the Future; Shirley Russell – The Bride; Norma Moriceau – Mad Max Beyond Thunderdome; Raymond Hughes – Return to Oz
Best Make-up	Best Special Effects
**Tom Savini – Day of the Dead**; Chris Walas – Enemy Mine; Rob Bottin – Explorers; Anthony Doublin, John Naulin, and John Carl Buechler – Re-Animator; William Munns – The Return of the Living Dead	**Kevin Pike – Back to the Future**; (The L.A. Effects Group) – Commando; Bruce Nicholson and Ralph Winter – Explorers; Richard Edlund – Fright Night; (Apogee) – Lifeforce

=== Special awards ===
==== George Pal Memorial Award ====
- Charles Band

==== Life Career Award ====
- Vincent Price

==== President's Award ====
- Woody Allen – The Purple Rose of Cairo
