= Terror at Red Wolf Inn =

- Theatrical one-sheet
- Directed by: Bud Townsend
- Screenplay by: Allen Actor
- Produced by: Michael Macready
- Starring: Linda Gillen; John Neilson; Arthur Space
- Cinematography: John McNichol
- Edited by: Al Maguire
- Music by: Bill Marx; Marilyn Lovell
- Production companies: Far West Films; Red Wolf Productions
- Distributed by: Intercontinental Releasing Corporation
- Release date: September 13, 1972 (Louisville, Kentucky)
- Running time: 90 minutes
- Country: United States
- Language: English

Terror at Red Wolf Inn is a 1972 American black comedy horror film directed by Bud Townsend, and starring Linda Gillen, John Neilson, Arthur Space, Mary Jackson, Janet Wood, and Margaret Avery. The plot follows a young college student who wins a vacation to a rural resort run by an elderly couple who serve meals of human flesh.

Filmed in California in 1971, the film was initially released under the title The Folks at Red Wolf Inn, and later screened in a censored PG-rated cut as Terror House.

Terror at Red Wolf Inn earned a Golden Scroll Award nomination for Best Horror Film at the 2nd Saturn Awards in 1975. Though it contains prominent horror elements, critics and scholars have noted the film as an early example of the comedy horror genre due to its "tongue-in-cheek" humor.

== Plot ==
Regina is a lonely young college student. The rest of the students are leaving for spring break, but Regina has no money and no plans. As she is opening her mail, she notices that she has received a mysterious letter telling her that she has won a free vacation at a seaside bed and breakfast, called the Red Wolf Inn. When she calls the phone number in the letter, they tell her a private plane is waiting for her at the airport. The plane takes her to a remote rural destination, where she is greeted by a handsome but odd young man named Baby John Smith. Baby John takes her on a thrill ride, speeding through town and evading the police. When Regina enjoys the chase instead of being afraid, Baby John is impressed.

Arriving at the Inn, she is greeted by Henry and Evelyn Smith, the elderly proprietors of the mansion. They identify themselves as Baby John's grandparents. There are two other guests as well, both lovely young females named Pamela and Edwina. Regina asks to use the phone so she can call her mother, but it's out of order. The group sits down to an extravagant meal, during which Evelyn prompts them all to eat more and more.

That night, Regina goes to the kitchen to look for antacid. She is terrified when Baby John suddenly emerges from the walk-in refrigerator, brandishing a large knife. Her screaming wakes everyone else in the house, and Baby John apologizes for scaring her. Before going back to sleep, Edwina talks with Regina and says she can tell Regina and Baby John are attracted to one another, and Regina admits that it's true.

The next day, Edwina and Regina discover that Pamela has left, but Regina finds a carriage house behind the mansion where Pamela's stylish black dress is hanging. She also discovers a framed photo of the pilot who flew her to this isolated destination. Regina and Baby John share a moment on the beach, where they flirt in an almost childlike way. Baby John reacts violently when he reels in a shark on his fishing line, grabbing the animal by the tail and bashing it against a piece of driftwood. After this bizarre display, he tells Regina "I think I love you," and leaves. That night, there is another party, this time to celebrate Edwina's 'last night', as she is going home the next day. After another huge dinner, the group goes to bed, but the Smiths go to Edwina's room and abduct her before killing and dismembering her.

The next day, Regina is alarmed when Evelyn tells her that Edwina left without saying goodbye. Regina finds the phone in order and calls her mother, but before she can tell her anything, Evelyn disconnects them. A police car pulls up outside the mansion, and Regina bursts out of the house seeking help, but the cop is another grandson of the Smiths. Now realizing she is a prisoner, Regina is left in the charge of Baby John while the Smiths go into town, and she seizes the opportunity to explore the forbidden refrigerator, where she finds the severed heads of Edwina and Pamela. Regina realizes the Smiths are cannibals and she has been eating human flesh for two days. A panicked Regina bolts from the house with Baby John pursuing, but she is caught by Evelyn and Henry returning from their errand.

Regina knows that Henry and Evelyn intend to kill her, but Baby John has a childlike attitude, and thinks they will learn to accept her. At dinner that night, Regina faces an unspoken challenge: The Smiths study her carefully to see if she will eat the meat now that she knows what it is, hence judging if she would actually be able to join their clan as a mate for Baby John. Regina is unable to eat and runs from the table in disgust, and the Smiths have made up their mind that Regina will be meat. Baby John is distressed, and begins hurling dishes around screaming "No!!"

After dinner, he goes upstairs to help Regina escape. They sneak out of the house and try and escape in the car, but Henry has removed the spark plugs. They release their dog on the couple, and it corners them in the greenhouse, attacking Regina. Baby John kills it with a shovel, and the Smiths arrive shortly after. Realizing the dog is dead, Evelyn uses it to distract Baby John by weeping over the corpse, while Henry advances on Regina with a large cleaver. Regina starts screaming in a panic, and blood splatters over a nearby plant.

Baby John is seen sitting at a table in the Inn's kitchen, playing with a toy truck while someone sings a song to him that Evelyn used to sing. We see it is Regina, however, making cookies for Baby John. Meanwhile, in the freezer, Evelyn and Henry's severed heads are stored, with Regina apparently the inn's new chef.

== Cast ==
- Linda Gillen as Regina McKee (credited as Linda Gillin)
- John Neilson as Baby John Smith (credited as John Nielson)
- Arthur Space as Henry Smith
- Mary Jackson as Evelyn Smith
- Janet Wood as Pamela
- Margaret Avery as Edwina (credited as Margret Avery)
- Michael Macready as Jonathan the Deputy
- Earl Parker as Paul the Pilot

== Production ==
The Los Angeles Herald Examiner attributes three Californian locations for the filming, that took place in 1971: Montecito, Piru and Redlands. Other locations include the University of California, Santa Barbara campus, the Santa Barbara Municipal Airport, and Isla Vista. The Casa Dorinda estate in Montecito served as the exterior of the Red Wolf Inn. The residence had previously been featured in producer Michael Macready's previous horror film, Count Yorga, Vampire (1970). Additional interior filming took place on soundstages in Los Angeles.

== Release ==
The film was originally released under the title The Folks at Redwolf Inn. It opened in Louisville, Kentucky, on September 13, 1972, and in Madison, Wisconsin, on September 28, 1972. It was released in Buffalo, New York, on October 25, 1972. It was re-released in September 1973 in the United States with an R rating.

The film screened as Terror at Redwolf Inn beginning in 1975 and was also shown in a censored 83-minute PG-rated cut under the title Terror House in 1976.

== Reception ==
=== Critical response ===
Gregg Swem of the Courier Journal felt the film was poorly shot and criticized the performances, but conceded that "the one saving grace of this misadventure is a little suspense, handled well at times by director Bud Townsend." The Louisville Times's Dudley Saunders praised the film, writing that director Bud Townsend "plays it with many sly touches and minus the usual horror cliches and builds the suspense nicely on several occasions... it's nice to see a low-budget horror film made by people who really seem to care about what they're doing." Bridget Byrne of the Los Angeles Times similarly praised the film's "moody" screenplay and summarized: "Because it is well acted and affectionately directed, this comic horror film about genteel grandparents with barbaric appetites remains palatable."

TV Guide awarded the film one out of four stars, but added that it is a "gruesome parody... Creepy and witty in all the right spots, [Terror at Red Wolf Inn] is no masterwork, but it does have some merit as part of the subgenre of family horror." Film critic James Arena wrote of the film: "Packed tighter than a sardine can with cannibalism innuendos, some of this movie's dialogue [feels] a wee bit redundant. The most disturbing thing about it [is] watching the innkeepers' deplorable table manners at meal time."

Leonard Maltin awarded the film one-and-a-half stars out of four, writing that it "Predates other cannibalism efforts, and doesn't take itself that seriously." Roger Ebert chose it as one of his "Dogs of the Week" on Sneak Previews, when he viewed the film under the title Terror House.

=== Accolades ===
The film was nominated for the award for Golden Scroll Award for Best Horror Film at the 2nd Saturn Awards in 1975.

== Legacy ==
Terror at Red Wolf Inn has been noted by film scholars such as John Kenneth Muir as an early example of horror-comedy with its "light, almost tongue-in-cheek approach to the gruesome material." The narrative set-up in which the protagonist is tricked into winning a fake vacation was an influence on I Still Know What You Did Last Summer (1998).

== Sources ==
- Arena, James (2011). Fright Night on Channel 9: Saturday Night Horror Films on New York's WOR-TV, 1973–1987. McFarland & Company. ISBN 978-0-786-48891-9.
- Maltin, Leonard (1994). Leonard Maltin's Movie and Video Guide: 1995 Edition. New York City, New York: Plume. ISBN 978-0-452-27327-6.
- Muir, John Kenneth (2011). Horror Films of the 1970s. Jefferson, North Carolina: McFarland & Company. ISBN 978-0-786-49156-8.
