= 6th Saturn Awards =

US film and television awards ceremony

- Date: February 24, 1979
- Site: California, U.S.

Highlights
- Most awards: Superman (5)
- Most nominations: Heaven Can Wait (8); Superman (8)

The 6th Saturn Awards were awarded to media properties and personalities deemed by the Academy of Science Fiction, Fantasy and Horror Films to be the best in science fiction, fantasy and horror released in 1978. They were awarded on February 24, 1979.

== Winners and nominees ==
Below is a complete list of nominees and winners. Winners are highlighted in bold.

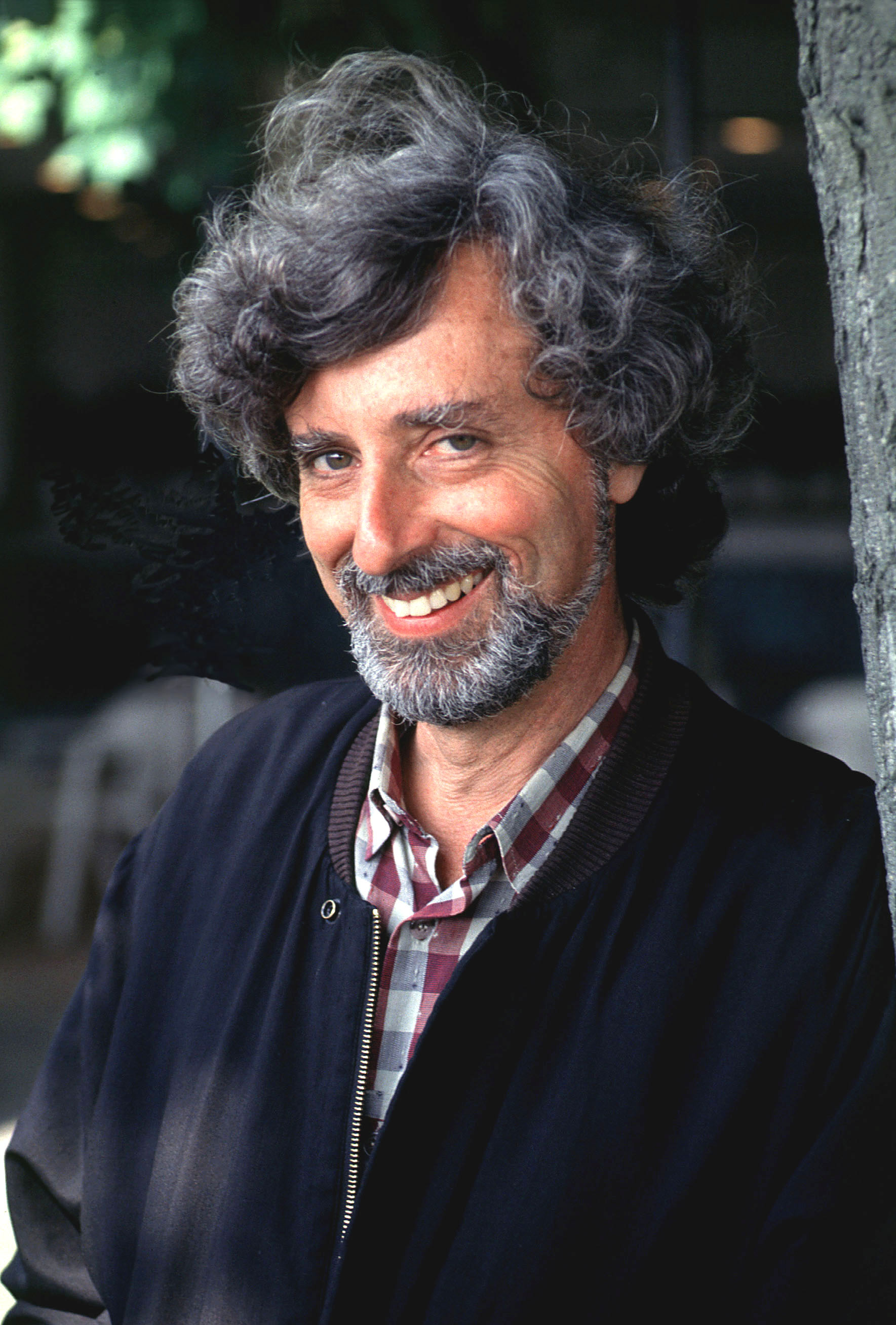
Philip Kaufman, Best Director winner

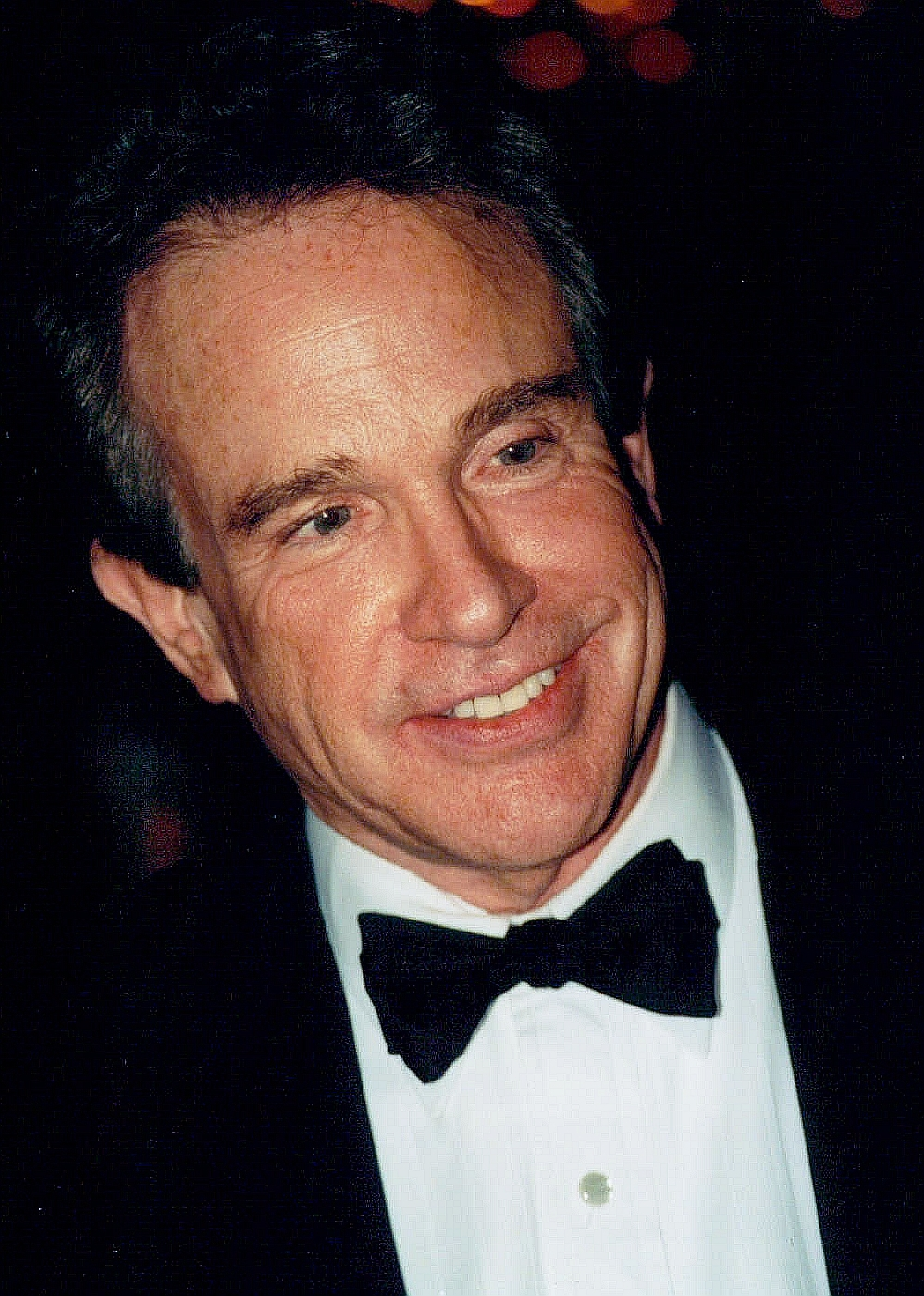
Warren Beatty, Best Actor winner and Best Writing co-winner

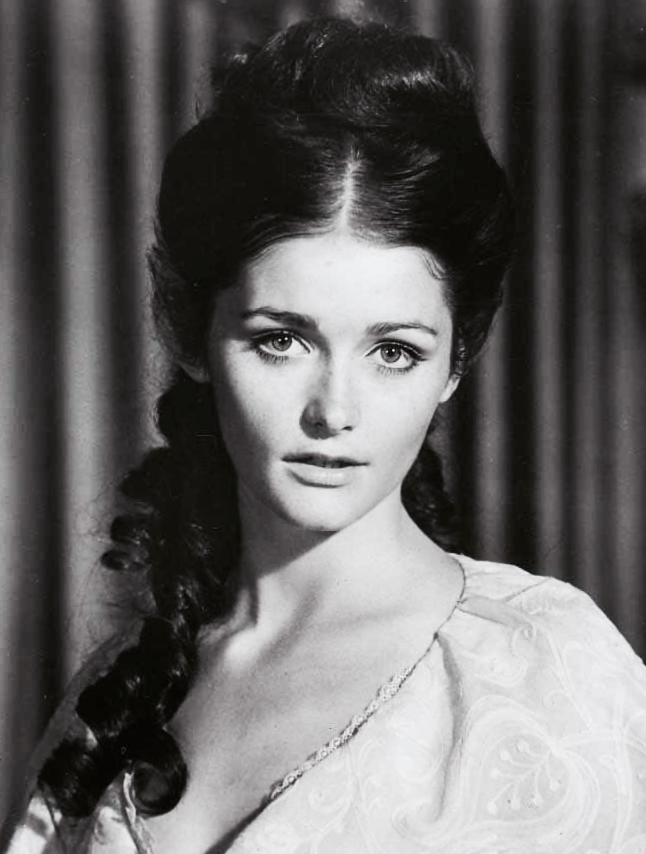
Margot Kidder, Best Actress winner

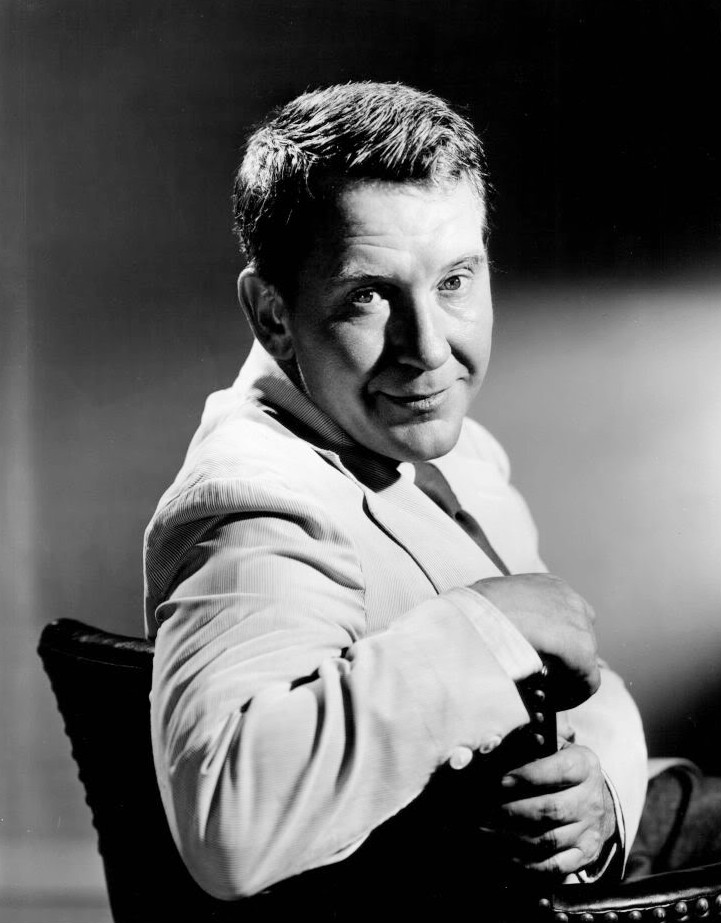
Burgess Meredith, Best Supporting Actor winner

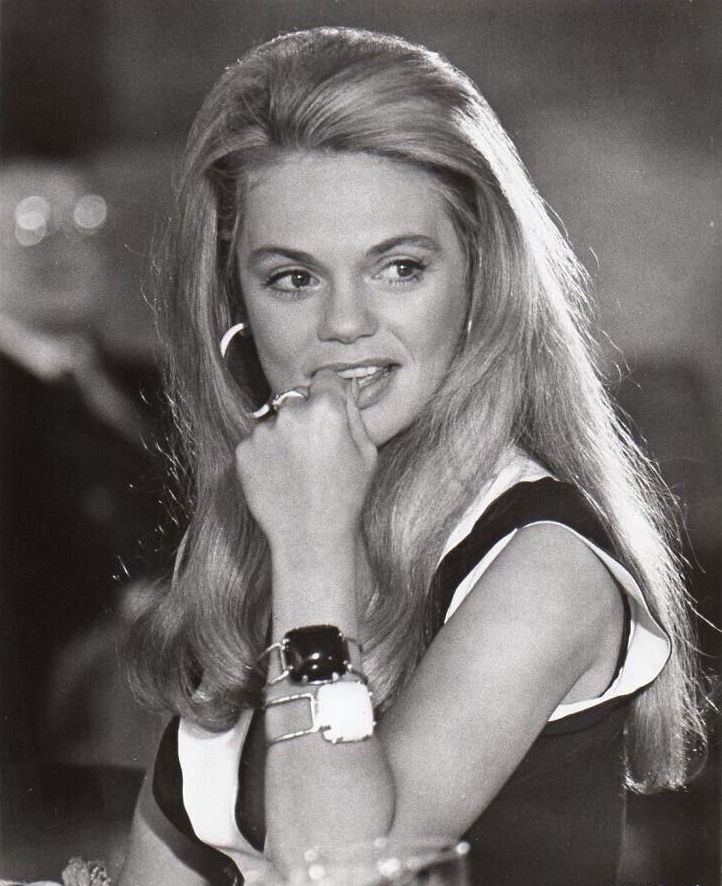
Dyan Cannon, Best Supporting Actress winner

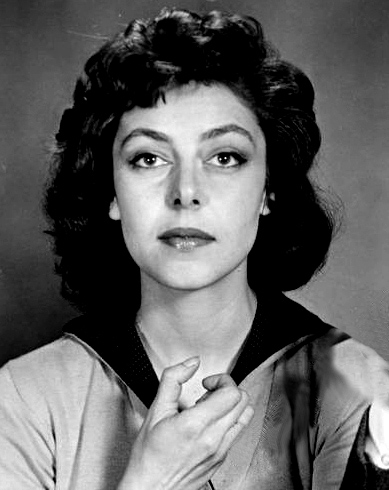
Elaine May, Best Writing co-winner

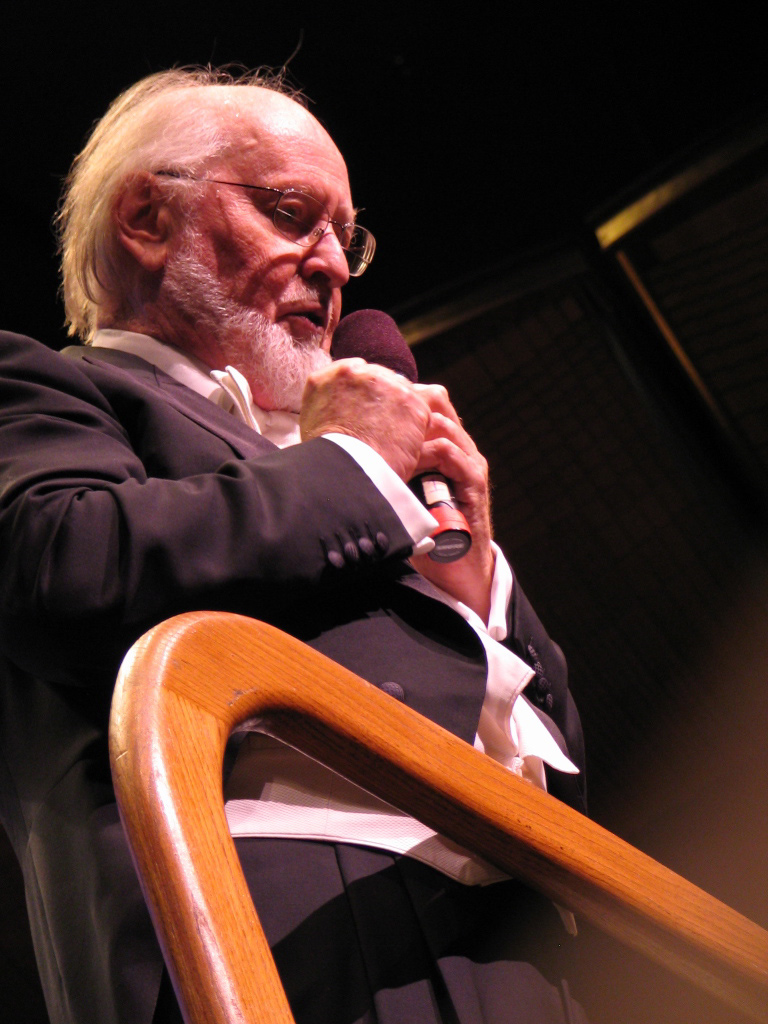
John Williams, Best Music winner

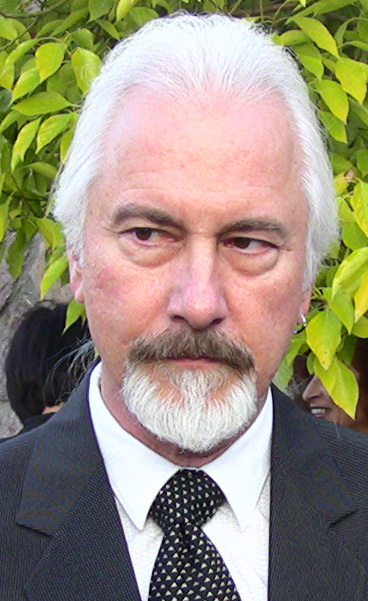
Rick Baker, Best Make-up co-winner

=== Film awards ===
Best Science Fiction Film	Best Fantasy Film
**Superman**; The Boys from Brazil; Capricorn One; The Cat from Outer Space; Invasion of the Body Snatchers	**Heaven Can Wait**; The Lord of the Rings; The Marvelous Visit; Watership Down; The Wiz
Best Horror Film	
**The Wicker Man**; Dawn of the Dead; Halloween; Magic; The Medusa Touch; Piranha	
Best Actor	Best Actress
**Warren Beatty – Heaven Can Wait as Joe Pendleton**; Christopher Lee – The Wicker Man as Lord Summerisle; Laurence Olivier – The Boys from Brazil as Ezra Lieberman; Christopher Reeve – Superman as Superman / Clark Kent / Kal-El; Donald Sutherland – Invasion of the Body Snatchers as Matthew Bennell	**Margot Kidder – Superman as Lois Lane**; Brooke Adams – Invasion of the Body Snatchers as Elizabeth Driscoll; Geneviève Bujold – Coma as Dr. Susan Wheeler; Ann-Margret – Magic as Peggy Ann Snow; Diana Ross – The Wiz as Dorothy
Best Supporting Actor	Best Supporting Actress
**Burgess Meredith – Magic as Ben Greene**; Michael Ansara – The Manitou as John Singing Rock; Michael Jackson – The Wiz as Scarecrow; James Mason – Heaven Can Wait as Mr. Jordan; Leonard Nimoy – Invasion of the Body Snatchers as Dr. David Kibner	**Dyan Cannon – Heaven Can Wait as Julia Farnsworth**; Uta Hagen – The Boys from Brazil as Frieda Maloney; Mabel King – The Wiz as Evilene; Valerie Perrine – Superman as Eve Teschmacher; Brenda Vaccaro – Capricorn One as Kay Brubaker
Best Director	Best Writing
**Philip Kaufman – Invasion of the Body Snatchers**; Warren Beatty and Buck Henry – Heaven Can Wait; Richard Donner – Superman; Robin Hardy – The Wicker Man; Franklin J. Schaffner – The Boys from Brazil	**Elaine May and Warren Beatty – Heaven Can Wait**; Heywood Gould – The Boys from Brazil; Cliff Green – Picnic at Hanging Rock; Anthony Shaffer – The Wicker Man; Alfred Sole and Rosemary Ritvo – Alice, Sweet Alice
Best Music	Best Costumes
**John Williams – Superman**; Paul Giovanni – The Wicker Man; Jerry Goldsmith – The Boys from Brazil; Jerry Goldsmith – Magic; Dave Grusin – Heaven Can Wait	**Theoni V. Aldredge – Eyes of Laura Mars**; Yvonne Blake and Richard Bruno – Superman; Patricia Norris – Capricorn One; Theadora Van Runkle and Richard Bruno – Heaven Can Wait; Tony Walton – The Wiz
Best Make-up	Best Special Effects
**William J. Tuttle and Rick Baker – The Fury**; Thomas R. Burman and Edouard F. Henriques – Invasion of the Body Snatchers; Lee Harman, Vincent Callaghan, and Lynn Donahue – Eyes of Laura Mars; Joe McKinney and Thomas R. Burman – The Manitou; Stan Winston – The Wiz	**Colin Chilvers – Superman**; Ira Anderson Jr. – Damien: Omen II; Henry Millar (Van der Veer Photo Effects) – Capricorn One; Dell Rheaume and Russel Hessey – Invasion of the Body Snatchers; Albert Whitlock – The Wiz
Special awards
Best Animation	Best Cinematography
**Watership Down**	**Russell Boyd – Picnic at Hanging Rock**
Best Editing	Best Production Design
**Joe Dante and Mark Goldblatt – Piranha**	**John Barry – Superman**
Best Publicist	Best Sound
**Julian F. Myers**	**Mark Berger, Art Rochester, and Andy Wiskes – Invasion of the Body Snatchers**
Best Television Performance	Golden Scroll of Merit
**Eric Greene (for juvenile acting) – Space Academy**	**Stanley Chase (for theatrical motion picture production) – Colossus: The Forbin Project**
Honorary Award	Life Career Award
**Margaret Hamilton**	**Christopher Lee**
