= 7th Saturn Awards =

US film and television awards ceremony

- Date: July 26, 1980
- Site: California, U.S.

Highlights
- Most awards: Alien; Love at First Bite; Time After Time (3)
- Most nominations: Star Trek: The Motion Picture (10)

The 7th Saturn Awards, honoring the best in science fiction, fantasy and horror film in 1979, were held on July 26, 1980.

== Winners and nominees ==
Below is a complete list of nominees and winners. Winners are highlighted in bold.

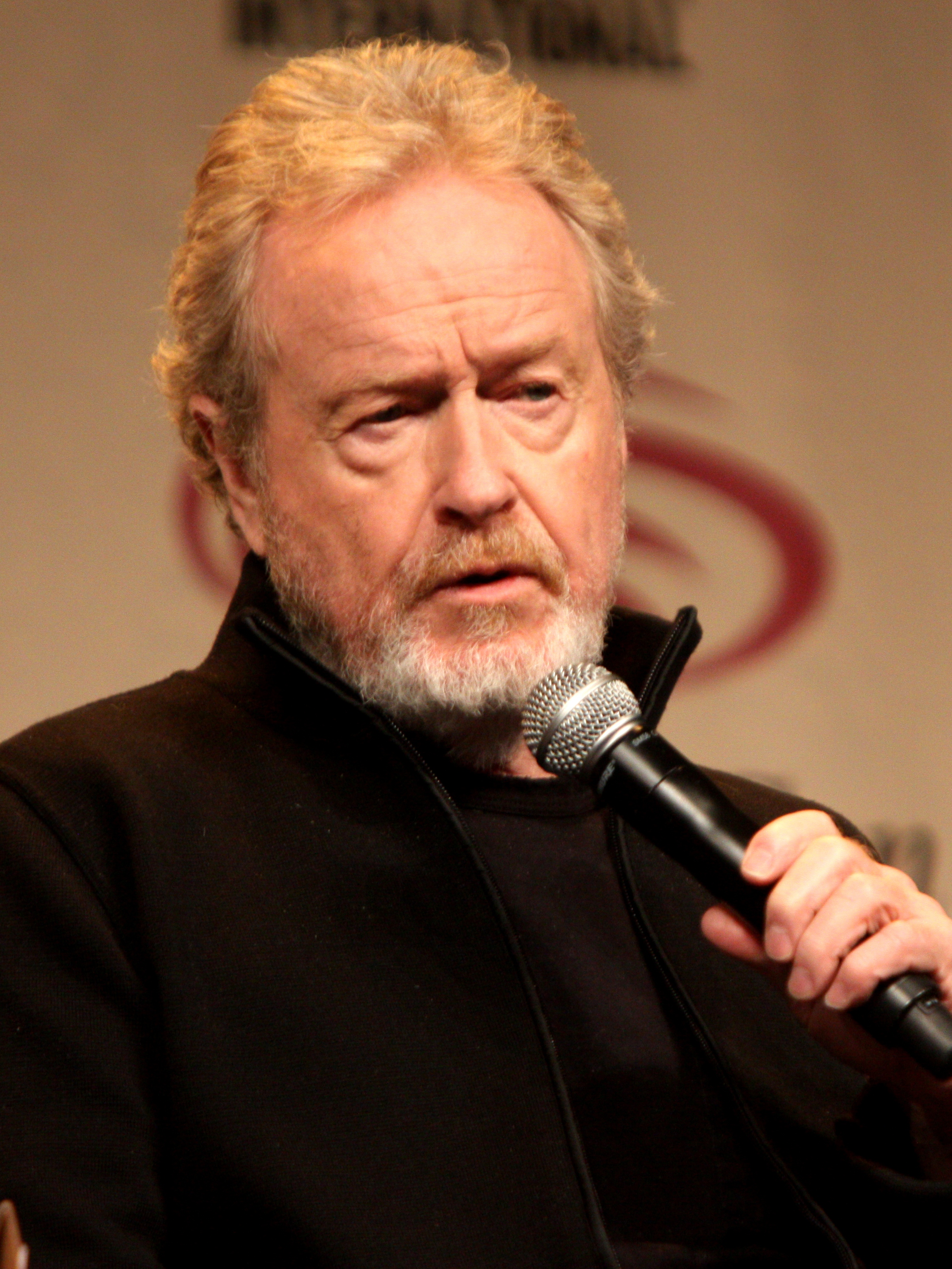
Ridley Scott, Best Director winner

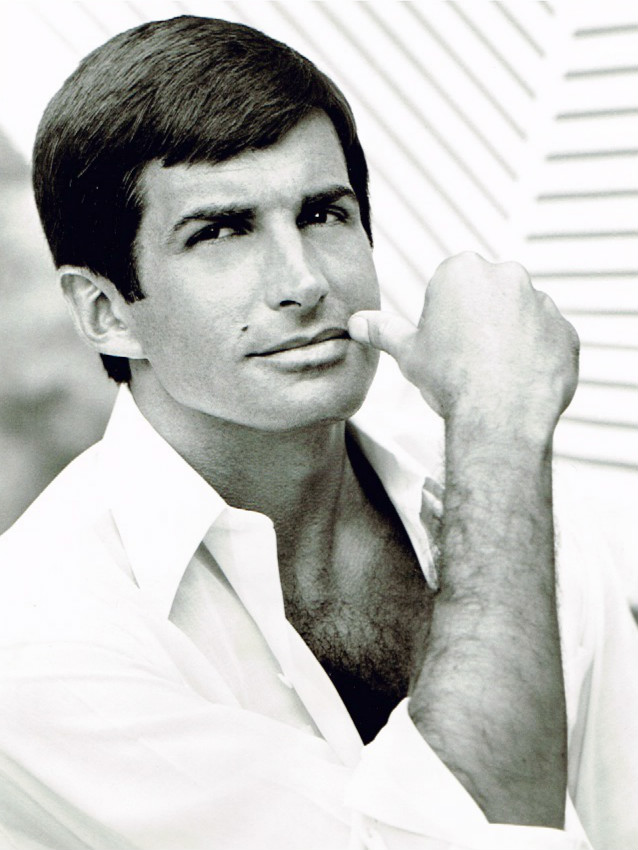
George Hamilton, Best Actor winner

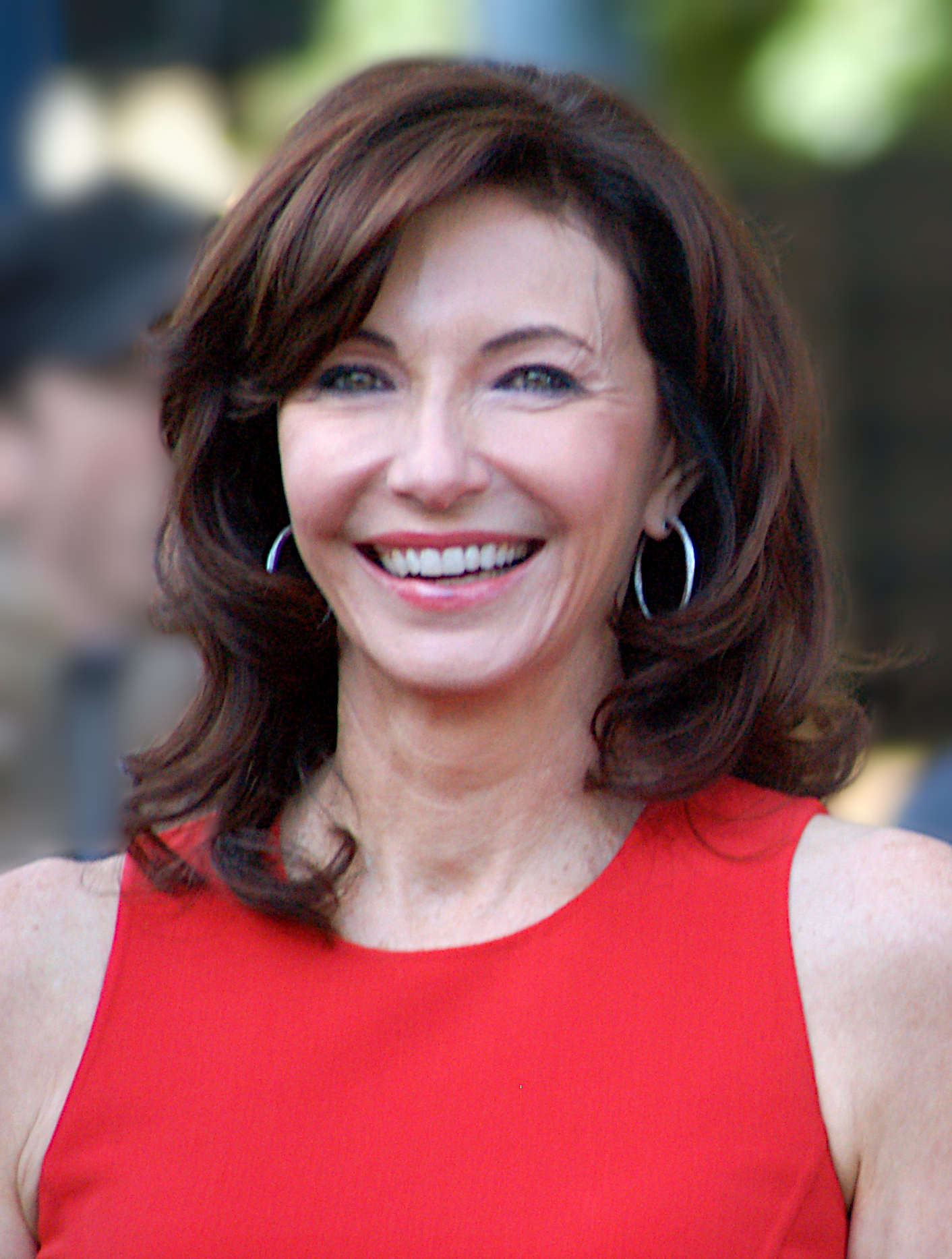
Mary Steenburgen, Best Actress winner

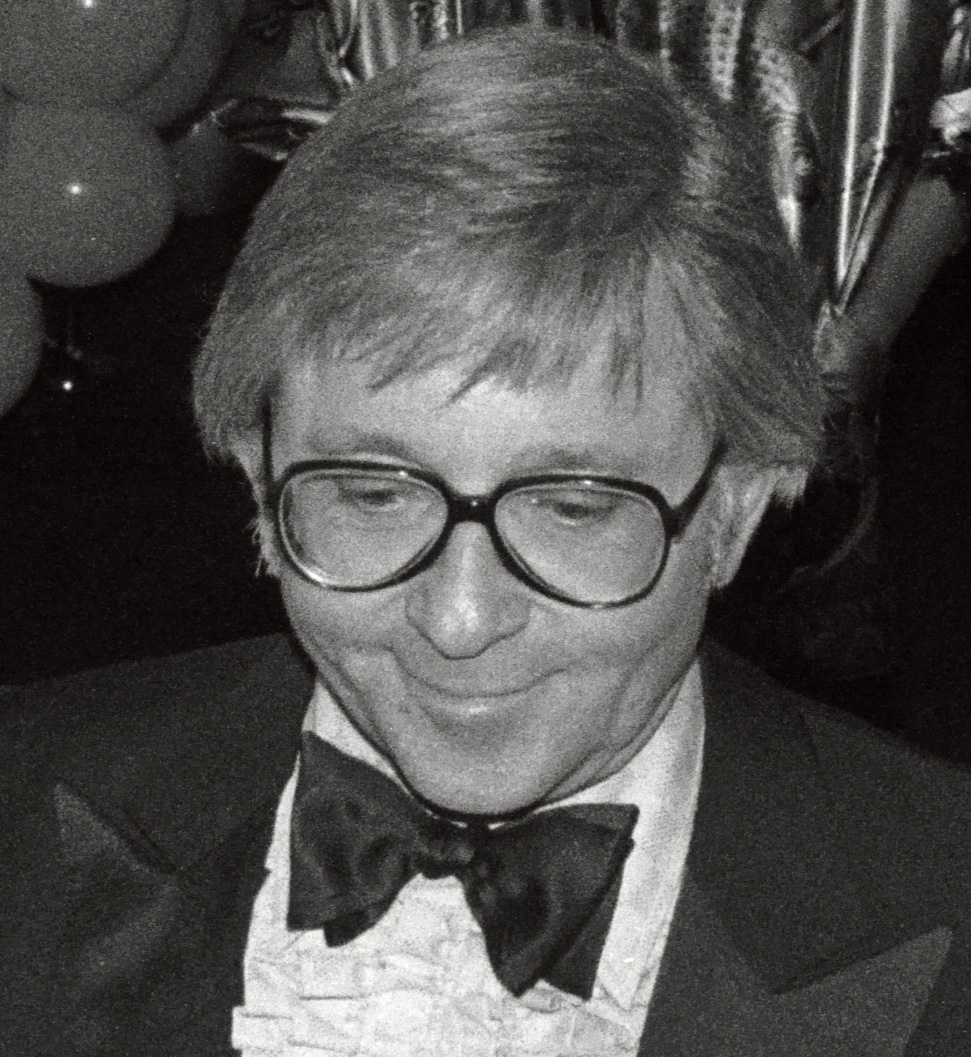
Arte Johnson, Best Supporting Actor winner

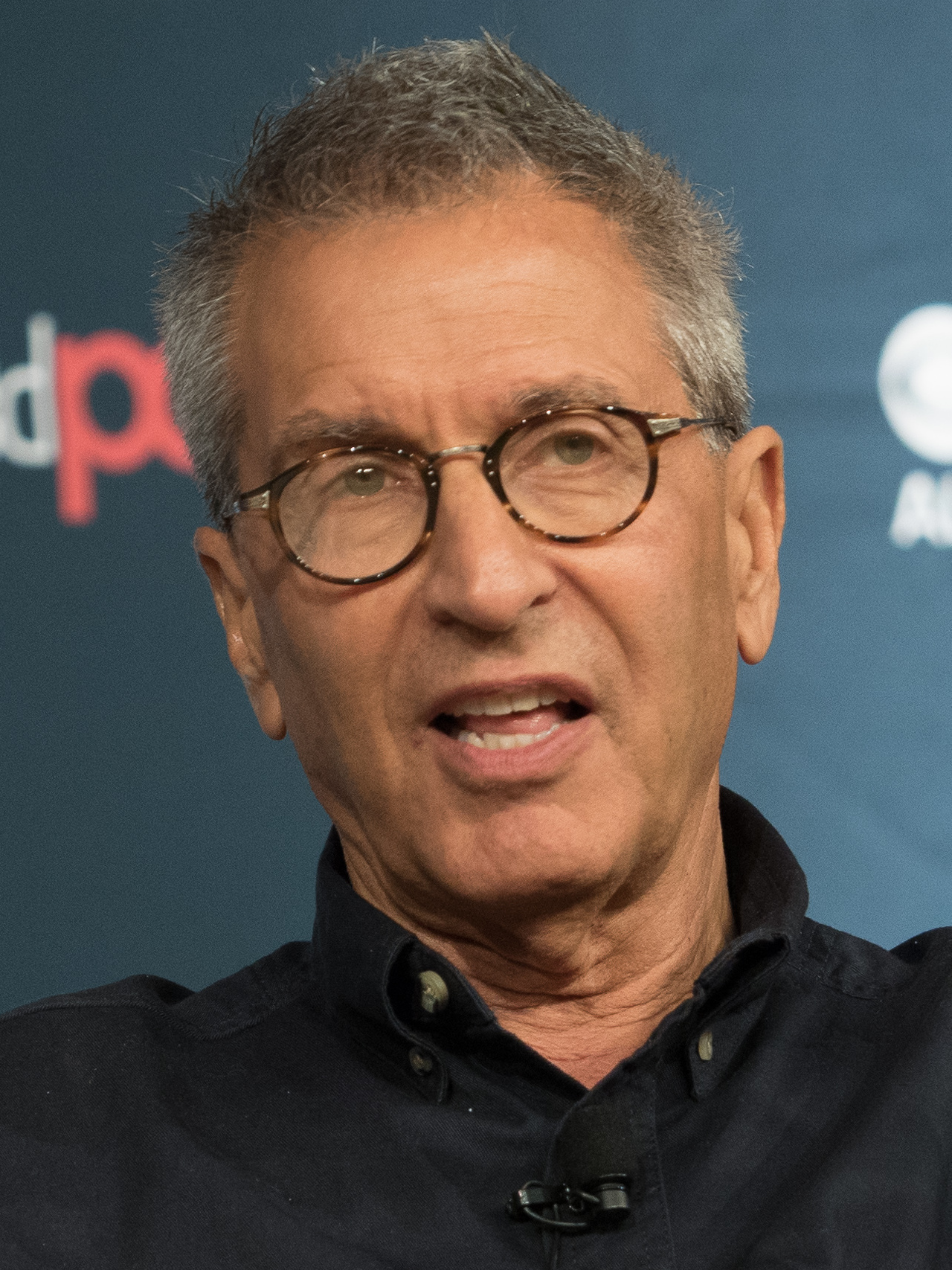
Nicholas Meyer, Best Writing winner

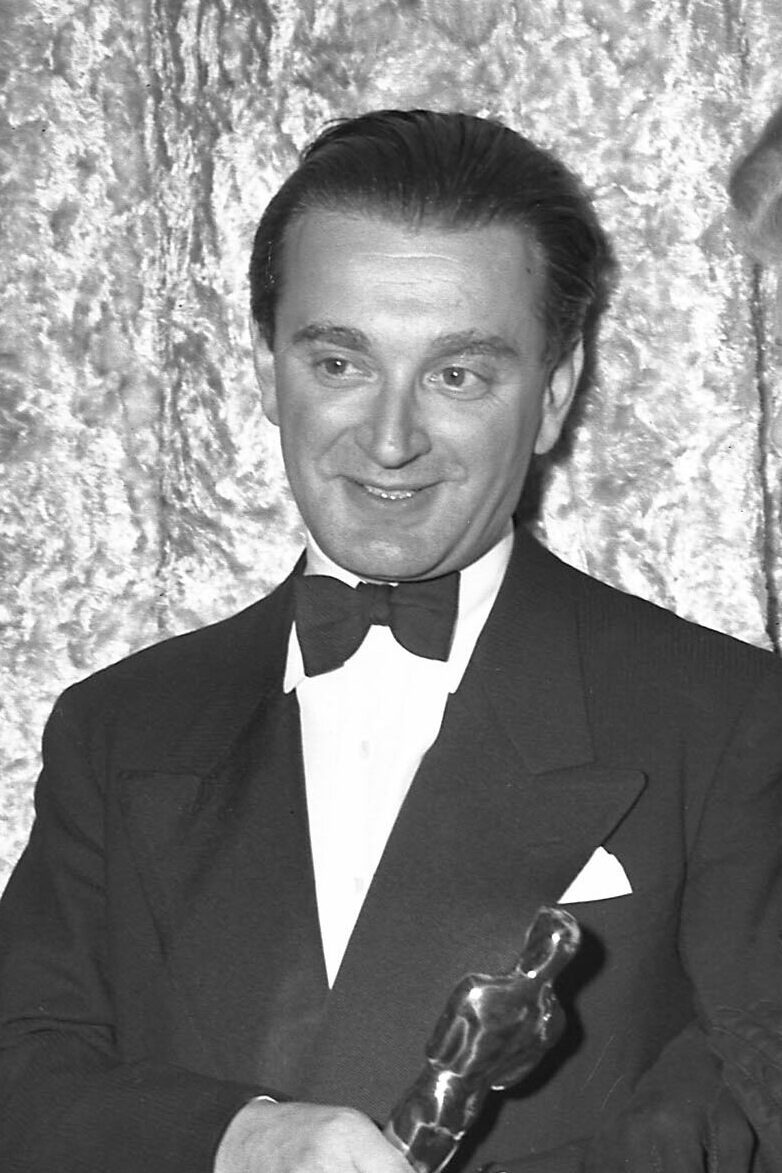
Miklós Rózsa, Best Music winner

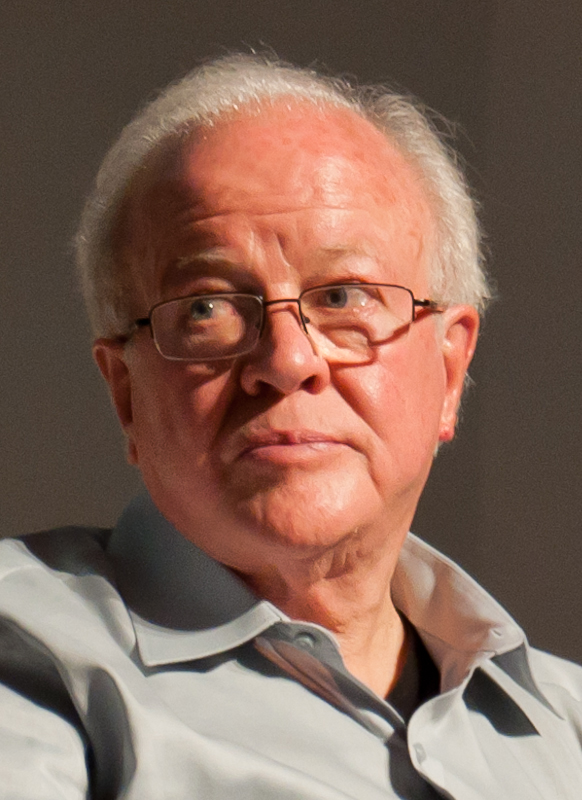
Douglas Trumbull, Best Special Effects co-winner

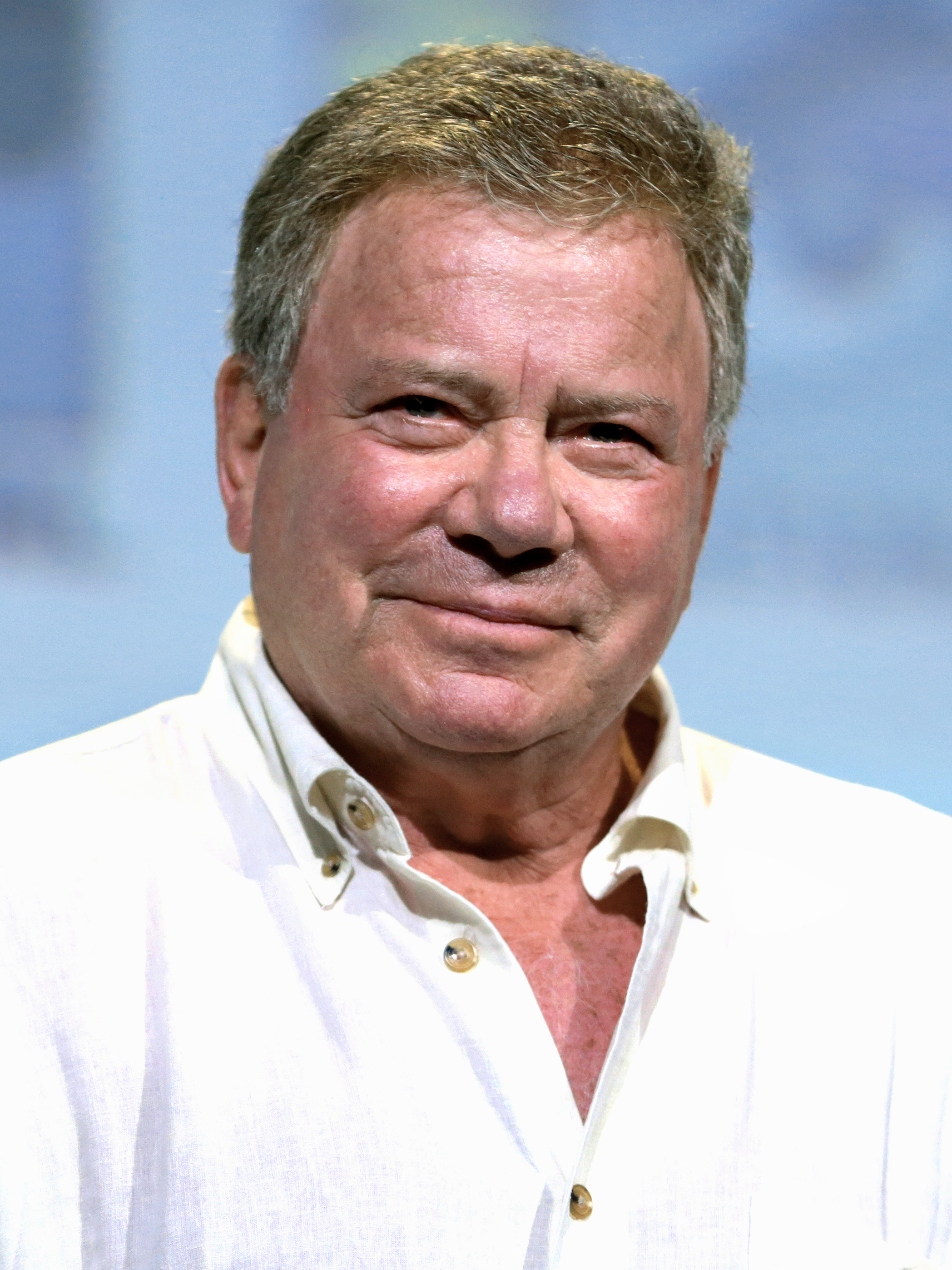
William Shatner, Life Career Award co-winner

=== Film awards ===
Best Science Fiction Film	Best Fantasy Film
**Alien**; The Black Hole; Moonraker; Star Trek: The Motion Picture; Time After Time	**The Muppet Movie**; Arabian Adventure; Dinner for Adele; The Last Wave; Nutcracker Fantasy
Best Horror Film	Best Foreign Film
**Dracula**; The Amityville Horror; Love at First Bite; The Mafu Cage; Phantasm	**Dinner for Adele**; Circle of Iron; Message from Space; Nosferatu the Vampyre; Patrick; Starcrash
Best Film Produced for Under $1,000,000	
**Planet of Dinosaurs**; The Clonus Horror	
Best Actor	Best Actress
**George Hamilton – Love at First Bite as Count Vladimir Dracula**; Frank Langella – Dracula as Count Dracula; Christopher Lee – Arabian Adventure as Caliph Alquazar; Malcolm McDowell – Time After Time as H. G. Wells; William Shatner – Star Trek: The Motion Picture as Captain James T. Kirk	**Mary Steenburgen – Time After Time as Amy Robbins**; Persis Khambatta – Star Trek: The Motion Picture as Ilia; Margot Kidder – The Amityville Horror as Kathleen "Kathy" Lutz; Susan Saint James – Love at First Bite as Cindy Sondheim; Sigourney Weaver – Alien as Ripley
Best Supporting Actor	Best Supporting Actress
**Arte Johnson – Love at First Bite as Renfield**; Richard Kiel – Moonraker as Jaws; Leonard Nimoy – Star Trek: The Motion Picture as Spock; Donald Pleasence – Dracula as Dr. John Seward; David Warner – Time After Time as Dr. John Leslie Stevenson / Jack the Ripper	**Veronica Cartwright – Alien as Lambert**; Pamela Hensley – Buck Rogers in the 25th Century as Princess Ardala; Jacquelyn Hyde – The Dark as De Renzy; Marcy Lafferty – The Day Time Ended as Beth Williams; Nichelle Nichols – Star Trek: The Motion Picture as Uhura
Best Director	Best Writing
**Ridley Scott – Alien**; John Badham – Dracula; Nicholas Meyer – Time After Time; Peter Weir – The Last Wave; Robert Wise – Star Trek: The Motion Picture	**Nicholas Meyer – Time After Time**; Jack Burns and Jerry Juhl – The Muppet Movie; Gerry Day and Jeb Rosebrook – The Black Hole; Robert Kaufman – Love at First Bite; Dan O'Bannon – Alien
Best Music	Best Costumes
**Miklós Rózsa – Time After Time**; Ken Thorne – Arabian Adventure; John Barry – The Black Hole; Paul Williams – The Muppet Movie; Jerry Goldsmith – Star Trek: The Motion Picture	**Jean-Pierre Dorleac – Buck Rogers in the 25th Century**; Jean-Pierre Dorleac – Battlestar Galactica (Episode: "Pilot"); Gisela Storch – Nosferatu the Vampyre; Robert Fletcher – Star Trek: The Motion Picture; Sal Anthony and Yvonne Kubis – Time After Time
Best Make-up	Best Special Effects
**William J. Tuttle – Love at First Bite**; Pat Hay – Alien; Tom Savini – Dawn of the Dead; Peter Robb-King – Dracula; Fred Phillips, Janna Phillips, and Ve Neill – Star Trek: The Motion Picture	**John Dykstra, Douglas Trumbull, and Richard Yuricich – Star Trek: The Motion Picture**; Nick Allder and Brian Johnson – Alien; Peter Ellenshaw – The Black Hole; John Evans and John Richardson – Moonraker; Robbie Knott – The Muppet Movie

=== Special awards ===
==== Hall of Fame ====
- The Rocky Horror Picture Show

==== Life Career Award ====
- Gene Roddenberry
- William Shatner

==== George Pal Memorial Award ====
- John Badham

==== Most Popular International Performer ====
- Roger Moore

==== Outstanding Achievement to the Academy ====
- Robert V. Michelucci
- William G. Wilson Jr.
