= Saturn Award for Best Science Fiction Film =

Annual film award

- Awarded for: Best motion picture of the year in the science fiction genre
- Country: United States
- Presented by: Academy of Science Fiction, Fantasy and Horror Films
- First award: 1972
- Currently held by: Avatar: Fire and Ash (2024/2025)
- Website: saturnawards.org

The Saturn Award for Best Science Fiction Film is one of the Saturn Awards that has been presented annually since 1972 by the Academy of Science Fiction, Fantasy and Horror Films to the best film in the science fiction genre of the previous year.

== Winners and nominees ==
In the list below, winners are listed first in bold, followed by the other nominees. The number of the ceremony (1st, 2nd, etc.) appears in parentheses after the awards year, linked to the article (if any) on that ceremony.

=== 1970s ===
Year	Film
1972 **(1st)**	**Slaughterhouse-Five**
1973 **(2nd)**	**Soylent Green**
1973 **(2nd)**	Battle for the Planet of the Apes
1973 **(2nd)**	Beware! The Blob
1973 **(2nd)**	The Day of the Dolphin
1973 **(2nd)**	The Neptune Factor
1973 **(2nd)**	Sleeper
1973 **(2nd)**	Sssssss
1973 **(2nd)**	Westworld
1974/1975 **(3rd)**	**Rollerball**
1974/1975 **(3rd)**	A Boy and His Dog
1974/1975 **(3rd)**	The Stepford Wives
1976 **(4th)**	**Logan's Run**
1976 **(4th)**	Embryo
1976 **(4th)**	Futureworld
1976 **(4th)**	God Told Me To
1976 **(4th)**	The Man Who Fell to Earth
1976 **(4th)**	Network
1976 **(4th)**	Solaris (Солярис)
1977 **(5th)**	**Star Wars**
1977 **(5th)**	Close Encounters of the Third Kind
1977 **(5th)**	Demon Seed
1977 **(5th)**	The Island of Dr. Moreau
1977 **(5th)**	Twilight's Last Gleaming
1978 **(6th)**	**Superman**
1978 **(6th)**	The Boys from Brazil
1978 **(6th)**	Capricorn One
1978 **(6th)**	The Cat from Outer Space
1978 **(6th)**	Invasion of the Body Snatchers
1979 **(7th)**	**Alien**
1979 **(7th)**	The Black Hole
1979 **(7th)**	Moonraker
1979 **(7th)**	Star Trek: The Motion Picture
1979 **(7th)**	Time After Time

=== 1980s ===
Year	Film
1980 **(8th)**	**The Empire Strikes Back**
1980 **(8th)**	Altered States
1980 **(8th)**	Battle Beyond the Stars
1980 **(8th)**	The Final Countdown
1980 **(8th)**	Flash Gordon
1981 **(9th)**	**Superman II**
1981 **(9th)**	Escape from New York
1981 **(9th)**	Heartbeeps
1981 **(9th)**	Heavy Metal
1981 **(9th)**	Outland
1982 **(10th)**	**E.T. the Extra-Terrestrial**
1982 **(10th)**	Blade Runner
1982 **(10th)**	Endangered Species
1982 **(10th)**	Star Trek II: The Wrath of Khan
1982 **(10th)**	Tron
1983 **(11th)**	**Return of the Jedi**
1983 **(11th)**	Blue Thunder
1983 **(11th)**	Brainstorm
1983 **(11th)**	Strange Invaders
1983 **(11th)**	WarGames
1984 **(12th)**	**The Terminator**
1984 **(12th)**	Dune
1984 **(12th)**	Star Trek III: The Search for Spock
1984 **(12th)**	Starman
1984 **(12th)**	2010: The Year We Make Contact
1985 **(13th)**	**Back to the Future**
1985 **(13th)**	Cocoon
1985 **(13th)**	Enemy Mine
1985 **(13th)**	Mad Max Beyond Thunderdome
1985 **(13th)**	A View to a Kill
1986 **(14th)**	**Aliens**
1986 **(14th)**	Flight of the Navigator
1986 **(14th)**	Peggy Sue Got Married
1986 **(14th)**	Short Circuit
1986 **(14th)**	Star Trek IV: The Voyage Home
1987 **(15th)**	**RoboCop**
1987 **(15th)**	The Hidden
1987 **(15th)**	Innerspace
1987 **(15th)**	Masters of the Universe
1987 **(15th)**	Predator
1987 **(15th)**	The Running Man
1988 **(16th)**	**Alien Nation**
1988 **(16th)**	The Blob
1988 **(16th)**	Cocoon: The Return
1988 **(16th)**	My Stepmother Is an Alien
1988 **(16th)**	Short Circuit 2
1988 **(16th)**	They Live
1989/1990 **(17th)**	**Total Recall**
1989/1990 **(17th)**	The Abyss
1989/1990 **(17th)**	Back to the Future Part II
1989/1990 **(17th)**	Back to the Future Part III
1989/1990 **(17th)**	Bill & Ted's Excellent Adventure
1989/1990 **(17th)**	Flatliners
1989/1990 **(17th)**	Honey, I Shrunk the Kids
1989/1990 **(17th)**	RoboCop 2
1989/1990 **(17th)**	Tremors

=== 1990s ===
Year	Film
1991 **(18th)**	**Terminator 2: Judgment Day**
1991 **(18th)**	Frankenstein Unbound
1991 **(18th)**	Prayer of the Rollerboys
1991 **(18th)**	Predator 2
1991 **(18th)**	The Rocketeer
1991 **(18th)**	Timescape
1992 **(19th)**	**Star Trek VI: The Undiscovered Country**
1992 **(19th)**	Alien 3
1992 **(19th)**	Freejack
1992 **(19th)**	Honey, I Blew Up the Kid
1992 **(19th)**	The Lawnmower Man
1992 **(19th)**	Memoirs of an Invisible Man
1993 **(20th)**	**Jurassic Park**
1993 **(20th)**	Demolition Man
1993 **(20th)**	Fire in the Sky
1993 **(20th)**	Fortress
1993 **(20th)**	Man's Best Friend
1993 **(20th)**	The Meteor Man
1993 **(20th)**	RoboCop 3
1994 **(21st)**	**Stargate**
1994 **(21st)**	Body Snatchers
1994 **(21st)**	No Escape
1994 **(21st)**	The Puppet Masters
1994 **(21st)**	Star Trek Generations
1994 **(21st)**	Street Fighter
1994 **(21st)**	Timecop
1995 **(22nd)**	**12 Monkeys**
1995 **(22nd)**	Congo
1995 **(22nd)**	Judge Dredd
1995 **(22nd)**	Outbreak
1995 **(22nd)**	Species
1995 **(22nd)**	Strange Days
1995 **(22nd)**	Waterworld
1996 **(23rd)**	**Independence Day**
1996 **(23rd)**	Escape from L.A.
1996 **(23rd)**	The Island of Dr. Moreau
1996 **(23rd)**	Mars Attacks!
1996 **(23rd)**	Mystery Science Theater 3000: The Movie
1996 **(23rd)**	Star Trek: First Contact
1997 **(24th)**	**Men in Black**
1997 **(24th)**	Alien: Resurrection
1997 **(24th)**	Contact
1997 **(24th)**	The Fifth Element
1997 **(24th)**	The Postman
1997 **(24th)**	Starship Troopers
1998 **(25th)**	**Armageddon**
1998 **(25th)**	**Dark City**
1998 **(25th)**	Deep Impact
1998 **(25th)**	Lost in Space
1998 **(25th)**	Star Trek: Insurrection
1998 **(25th)**	The X Files: Fight the Future
1999 **(26th)**	**The Matrix**
1999 **(26th)**	eXistenZ
1999 **(26th)**	Galaxy Quest
1999 **(26th)**	Pitch Black
1999 **(26th)**	Star Wars: Episode I – The Phantom Menace
1999 **(26th)**	The Thirteenth Floor

=== 2000s ===
Year	Film
2000 **(27th)**	**X-Men**
2000 **(27th)**	The Cell
2000 **(27th)**	Hollow Man
2000 **(27th)**	The 6th Day
2000 **(27th)**	Space Cowboys
2000 **(27th)**	Titan A.E.
2001 **(28th)**	**A.I. Artificial Intelligence**
2001 **(28th)**	Jurassic Park III
2001 **(28th)**	Lara Croft: Tomb Raider
2001 **(28th)**	The One
2001 **(28th)**	Planet of the Apes
2001 **(28th)**	Vanilla Sky
2002 **(29th)**	**Minority Report**
2002 **(29th)**	Men in Black II
2002 **(29th)**	Signs
2002 **(29th)**	Solaris
2002 **(29th)**	Star Trek: Nemesis
2002 **(29th)**	Star Wars: Episode II – Attack of the Clones
2003 **(30th)**	**X2**
2003 **(30th)**	Hulk
2003 **(30th)**	Lara Croft Tomb Raider: The Cradle of Life
2003 **(30th)**	The Matrix Revolutions
2003 **(30th)**	Paycheck
2003 **(30th)**	Terminator 3: Rise of the Machines
2004 **(31st)**	**Eternal Sunshine of the Spotless Mind**
2004 **(31st)**	The Butterfly Effect
2004 **(31st)**	The Day After Tomorrow
2004 **(31st)**	The Forgotten
2004 **(31st)**	I, Robot
2004 **(31st)**	Sky Captain and the World of Tomorrow
2005 **(32nd)**	**Star Wars: Episode III – Revenge of the Sith**
2005 **(32nd)**	Fantastic Four
2005 **(32nd)**	The Island
2005 **(32nd)**	The Jacket
2005 **(32nd)**	Serenity
2005 **(32nd)**	War of the Worlds
2006 **(33rd)**	**Children of Men**
2006 **(33rd)**	Déjà Vu
2006 **(33rd)**	The Fountain
2006 **(33rd)**	The Prestige
2006 **(33rd)**	V for Vendetta
2006 **(33rd)**	X-Men: The Last Stand
2007 **(34th)**	**Cloverfield**
2007 **(34th)**	Fantastic Four: Rise of the Silver Surfer
2007 **(34th)**	I Am Legend
2007 **(34th)**	The Last Mimzy
2007 **(34th)**	Sunshine
2007 **(34th)**	Transformers
2008 **(35th)**	**Iron Man**
2008 **(35th)**	The Day the Earth Stood Still
2008 **(35th)**	Eagle Eye
2008 **(35th)**	The Incredible Hulk
2008 **(35th)**	Indiana Jones and the Kingdom of the Crystal Skull
2008 **(35th)**	Jumper
2009 **(36th)**	**Avatar**
2009 **(36th)**	The Book of Eli
2009 **(36th)**	Knowing
2009 **(36th)**	Moon
2009 **(36th)**	Star Trek
2009 **(36th)**	Transformers: Revenge of the Fallen
2009 **(36th)**	X-Men Origins: Wolverine

=== 2010s ===
Year	Film
2010 **(37th)**	**Inception**
2010 **(37th)**	Hereafter
2010 **(37th)**	Iron Man 2
2010 **(37th)**	Never Let Me Go
2010 **(37th)**	Splice
2010 **(37th)**	Tron: Legacy
2011 **(38th)**	**Rise of the Planet of the Apes**
2011 **(38th)**	The Adjustment Bureau
2011 **(38th)**	Captain America: The First Avenger
2011 **(38th)**	Limitless
2011 **(38th)**	Super 8
2011 **(38th)**	X-Men: First Class
2012 **(39th)**	**The Avengers**
2012 **(39th)**	Chronicle
2012 **(39th)**	Cloud Atlas
2012 **(39th)**	The Hunger Games
2012 **(39th)**	Looper
2012 **(39th)**	Prometheus
2013 **(40th)**	**Gravity**
2013 **(40th)**	Ender's Game
2013 **(40th)**	The Hunger Games: Catching Fire
2013 **(40th)**	Pacific Rim
2013 **(40th)**	Riddick
2013 **(40th)**	Star Trek Into Darkness
2014 **(41st)**	**Interstellar**
2014 **(41st)**	Dawn of the Planet of the Apes
2014 **(41st)**	Edge of Tomorrow
2014 **(41st)**	Godzilla
2014 **(41st)**	The Hunger Games: Mockingjay – Part 1
2014 **(41st)**	The Zero Theorem
2015 **(42nd)**	**Star Wars: The Force Awakens**
2015 **(42nd)**	Ex Machina
2015 **(42nd)**	Jurassic World
2015 **(42nd)**	Mad Max: Fury Road
2015 **(42nd)**	The Martian
2015 **(42nd)**	Terminator Genisys
2016 **(43rd)**	**Rogue One: A Star Wars Story**
2016 **(43rd)**	Arrival
2016 **(43rd)**	Independence Day: Resurgence
2016 **(43rd)**	Midnight Special
2016 **(43rd)**	Passengers
2016 **(43rd)**	Star Trek Beyond
2017 **(44th)**	**Blade Runner 2049**
2017 **(44th)**	Alien: Covenant
2017 **(44th)**	Life
2017 **(44th)**	Star Wars: The Last Jedi
2017 **(44th)**	Valerian and the City of a Thousand Planets
2017 **(44th)**	War for the Planet of the Apes
2018/2019 **(45th)**	**Ready Player One**
2018/2019 **(45th)**	Alita: Battle Angel
2018/2019 **(45th)**	Bumblebee
2018/2019 **(45th)**	Jurassic World: Fallen Kingdom
2018/2019 **(45th)**	Solo: A Star Wars Story
2018/2019 **(45th)**	Sorry to Bother You
2018/2019 **(45th)**	Upgrade
2019/2020 **(46th)**	**Star Wars: The Rise of Skywalker**
2019/2020 **(46th)**	Ad Astra
2019/2020 **(46th)**	Gemini Man
2019/2020 **(46th)**	Lucy in the Sky
2019/2020 **(46th)**	Tenet
2019/2020 **(46th)**	Terminator: Dark Fate

=== 2020s ===
Year	Film
2021/2022 **(50th)**	**Nope**
2021/2022 **(50th)**	Crimes of the Future
2021/2022 **(50th)**	Dune
2021/2022 **(50th)**	Free Guy
2021/2022 **(50th)**	Godzilla vs. Kong
2021/2022 **(50th)**	Jurassic World Dominion
2022/2023 **(51st)**	**Avatar: The Way of Water**
2022/2023 **(51st)**	The Creator
2022/2023 **(51st)**	M3GAN
2022/2023 **(51st)**	Prey
2022/2023 **(51st)**	Transformers: Rise of the Beasts
2023/2024 **(52nd)**	**Dune: Part Two**
2023/2024 **(52nd)**	Furiosa: A Mad Max Saga
2023/2024 **(52nd)**	The Hunger Games: The Ballad of Songbirds & Snakes
2023/2024 **(52nd)**	Kingdom of the Planet of the Apes
2023/2024 **(52nd)**	Megalopolis
2023/2024 **(52nd)**	Venom: The Last Dance
2024/2025 **(53rd)**	**Avatar: Fire and Ash**
2024/2025 **(53rd)**	Bugonia
2024/2025 **(53rd)**	Jurassic World Rebirth
2024/2025 **(53rd)**	Predator: Badlands
2024/2025 **(53rd)**	The Running Man
2024/2025 **(53rd)**	Tron: Ares

== Franchises ==
=== Multiple wins ===
7 wins

- Star Wars

3 wins

- Avatar

2 wins

- Alien
- MCU
- Superman
- Terminator
- X-Men

=== Multiple nominations ===
12 nominations

- Star Trek

11 nominations

- Star Wars

6 nominations

- Alien
- Planet of the Apes

5 nominations

- MCU
- Terminator
- X-Men

4 nominations

- The Hunger Games

3 nominations

- Avatar
- Back to the Future
- Robocop
- Transformers
- Mad Max

2 nominations

- Blade Runner
- Escape from New York
- Fantastic Four
- Godzilla
- Honey, I Shrunk the Kids
- Independence Day
- Iron Man
- The Matrix
- Predator
- Short Circuit
- Tomb Raider
- Tron

== See also ==
- Science fiction film
