= 2nd Saturn Awards =

US film and television awards ceremony

- Date: January 7, 1975
- Site: California, U.S.

Highlights
- Most awards: The Exorcist (4)

The 2nd Saturn Awards were presented to media properties and personalities deemed by the Academy of Science Fiction, Fantasy and Horror Films to be the best in science fiction, fantasy and horror released in 1973. The awards ceremony took place on January 7, 1975.

For this ceremony, the categories were expanded to ten, unlike the first ceremony, which had only two. Notably, Best Fantasy Film was introduced, one of the three Best Film categories that would remain for all future ceremonies, along with Best Horror Film and Best Science Fiction Film, the only two awards in the previous ceremony.

Below is the complete list of nominees and winners. Winners are highlighted in bold.

== Winners and nominees ==
Best Science Fiction Film	Best Horror Film
**Soylent Green**; Battle for the Planet of the Apes; Beware! The Blob; The Day of the Dolphin; The Neptune Factor; Sleeper; Sssssss; Westworld	**The Exorcist**; Arnold; Death Line; Don't Look Now; The Legend of Hell House; Schlock; Scream Blacula Scream; Sisters; Tales That Witness Madness; Terror House; Terror in the Wax Museum; Theatre of Blood; The Vault of Horror
Best Fantasy Film	Best Stop Motion Animation
**The Golden Voyage of Sinbad**	**Ray Harryhausen – The Golden Voyage of Sinbad**
Best Writer	Best Music
**William Peter Blatty – The Exorcist**	**Bernard Herrmann** (for his career)
Best Make-up	Best Special Effects
**Dick Smith – The Exorcist**	**Marcel Vercoutere – The Exorcist**
Special Achievement in Television	Special Award
**Curtis Harrington – Killer Bees**	**C. Dean Andersson, Don Fanzo, Charlton Heston, George Pal, Gloria Swanson, and Fay Wray**
