= Marilyn Lovell Matz =

American actress (1931–2012)

- Born: Marilynn E. Lovell; August 27, 1931; United States
- Died: April 13, 2012 (aged 80); Los Angeles, California, U.S.
- Occupation(s): Actress, singer and therapist
- Years active: 1959–2002
- Spouses: Howard "Howie" Storm (m. 1959, divorced) Peter Matz (m. 1981; died 2002)

Marilyn Lovell Matz (August 27, 1931 – April 13, 2012) was an American actress, singer, AIDS activist and therapist.

As a singer credited under her birth name of Marilynn Lovell, she released an LP on Jubilee Records in 1958, Scotch Mist, with arrangements by Stan Applebaum. Lovell's early acting roles included the variety shows The Danny Kaye Show and The Liberace Show. She appeared in guest roles on several television series, including The Munsters and Route 66. Lovell toured with Hello, Dolly!, which starred Mary Martin, throughout Asia and Europe in 1965, and appeared in an NBC documentary about the musical's foreign tour in 1966. Lovell sang on the motion picture soundtracks for several horror films during the early 1970s, including Scream Blacula Scream in 1973, The Return of Count Yorga in 1971, and Terror House.

During the 1970s and 1980s, Lovell began to pursue other professions and interests outside of entertainment. She returned to college as an adult and became a therapist. She specifically focused on AIDS patients with the onset of the AIDS epidemic during the 1980s. Lovell and her husband, Peter Matz, held fundraisers which raised thousands of dollars for AIDS Project Los Angeles.

Lovell continued her therapy practice during the 1990s. She simultaneously returned to the entertainment industry singing at jazz clubs and cabarets in the Los Angeles area, including the Jazz Bakery and Cinegrill. She was cast in a small role in the 1996 film, Ghosts of Mississippi, directed by Rob Reiner.

Matz died of complications from multiple sclerosis, which she lived with for thirty years, on April 13, 2012, at age 81.
