= 11th Saturn Awards =

US film and television awards ceremony

- Date: March 24, 1984
- Site: California, U.S.

Highlights
- Most awards: Return of the Jedi (5)
- Most nominations: Return of the Jedi (10)

The 11th Saturn Awards, honoring the best in science fiction, fantasy and horror film in 1983, were held on March 24, 1984.

== Winners and nominees ==
Below is a complete list of nominees and winners. Winners are highlighted in bold.

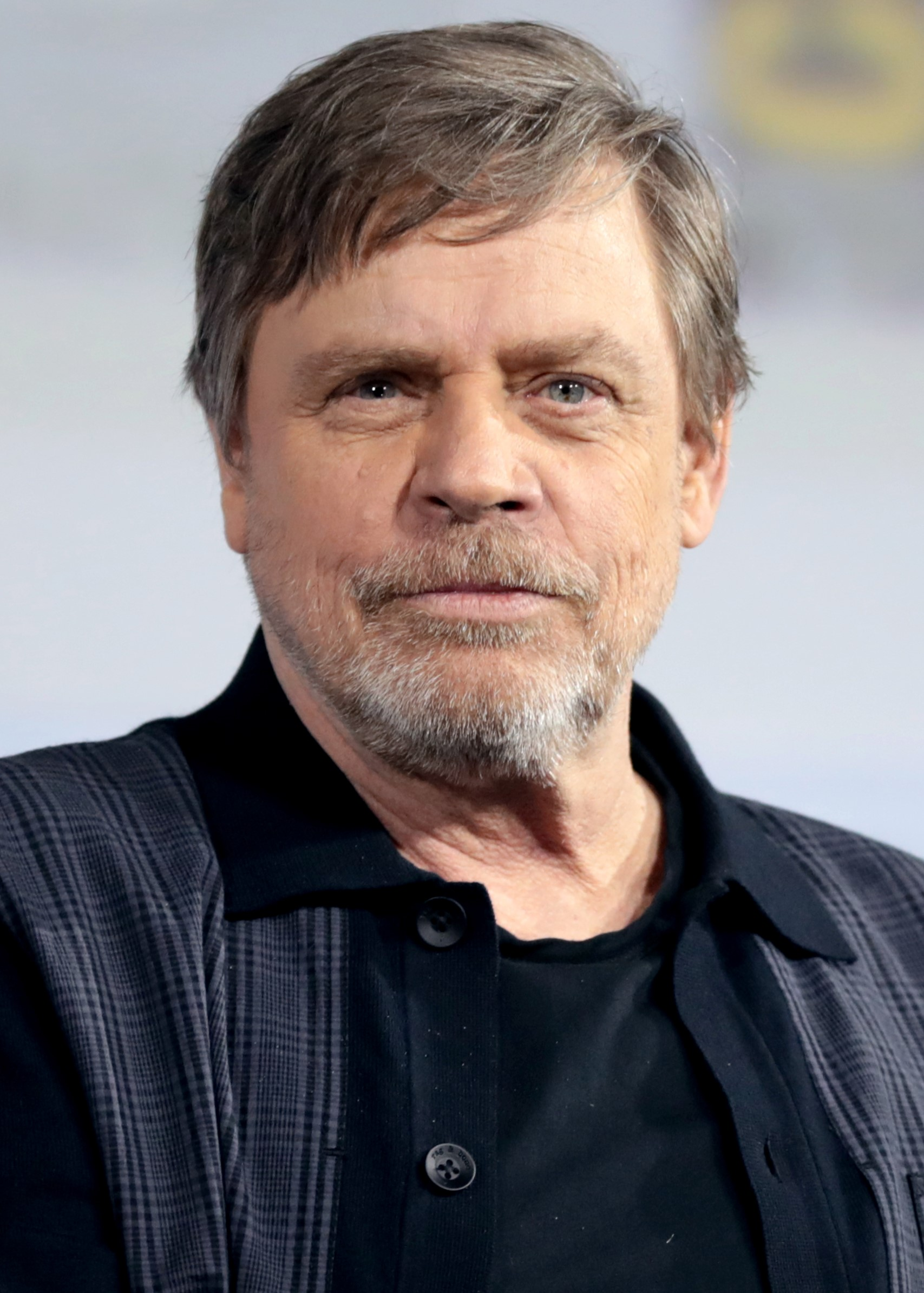
Mark Hamill, Best Actor winner.

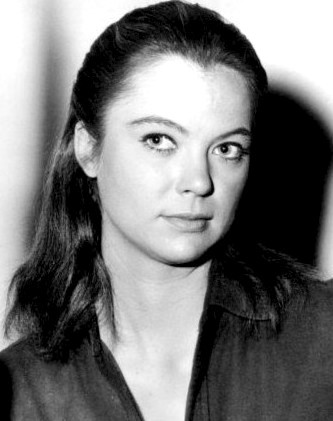
Louise Fletcher, Best Actress winner.

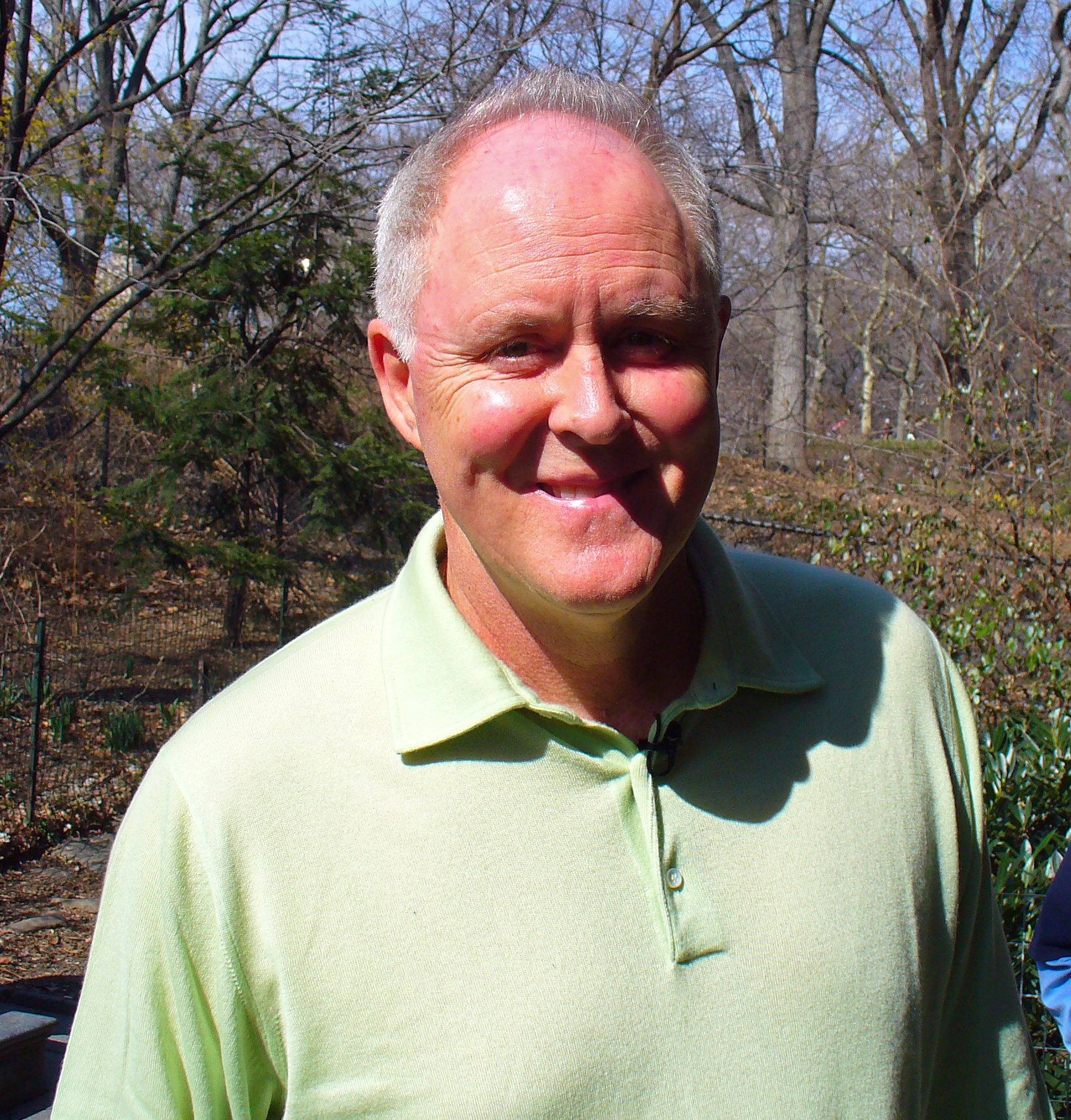
John Lithgow, Best Supporting Actor winner.

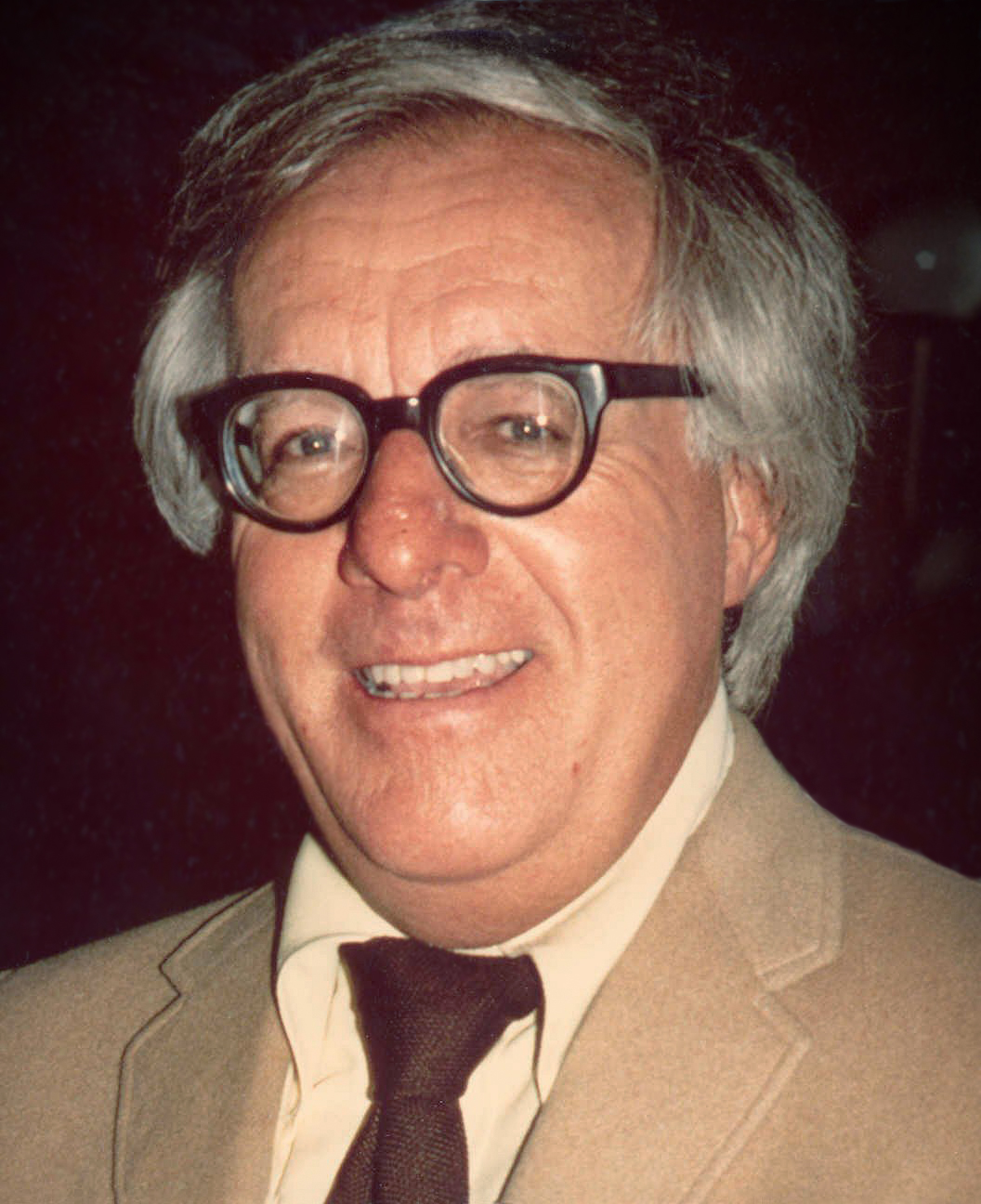
Ray Bradbury, Best Writing winner.

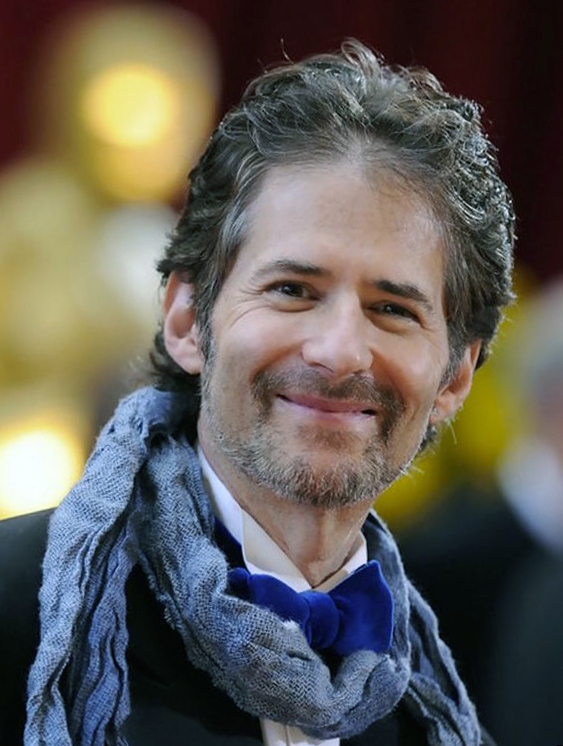
James Horner, Best Music winner.

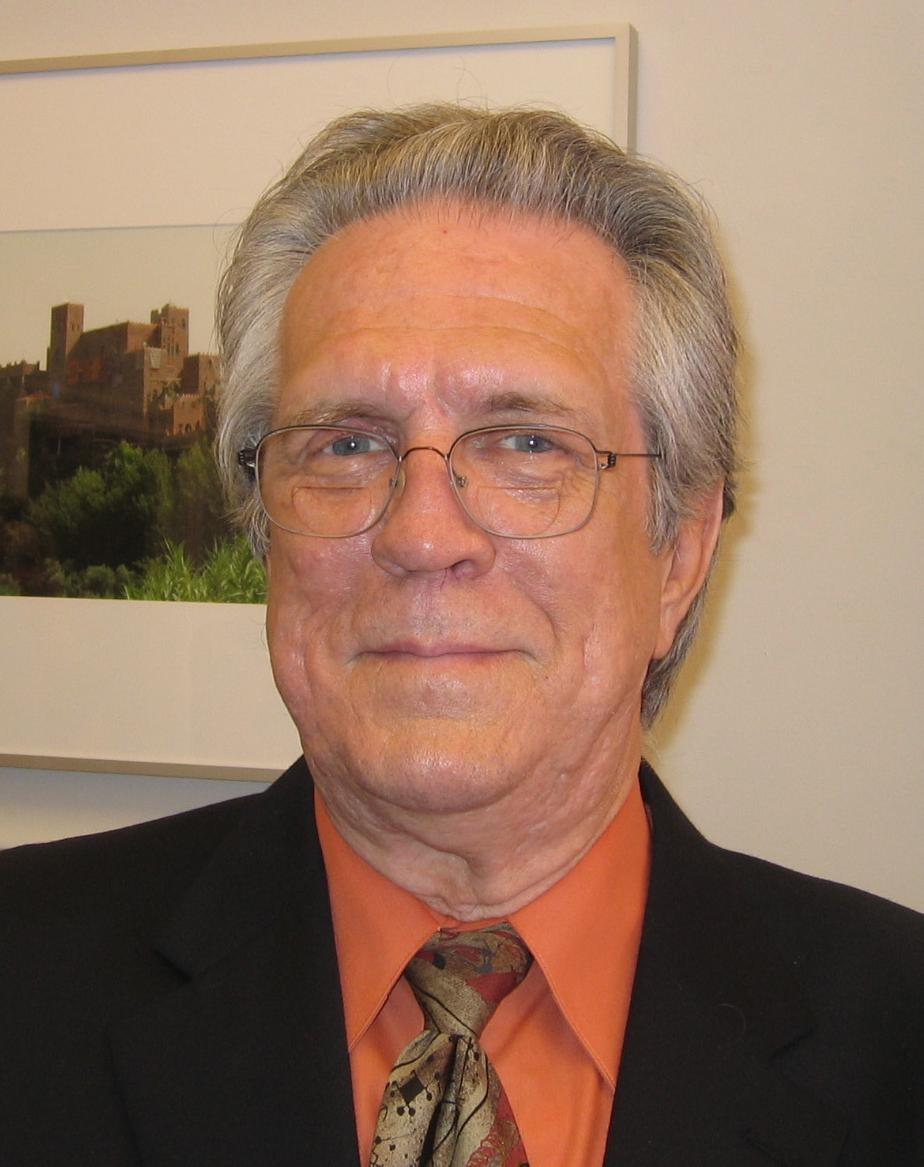
Richard Edlund, Best Special Effects co-winner.

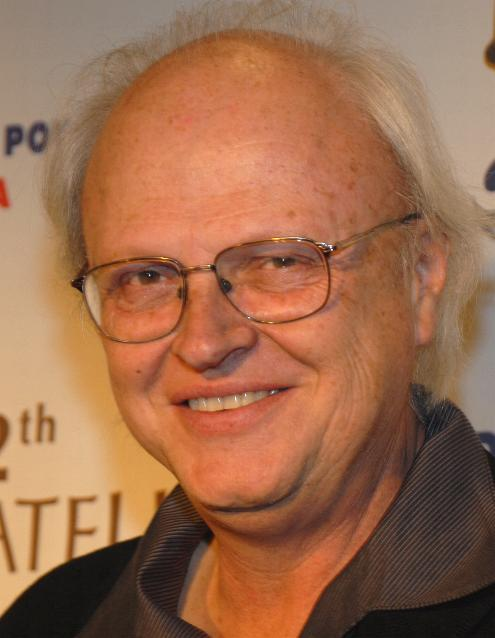
Dennis Muren, Best Special Effects co-winner.

=== Film awards ===
Best Science Fiction Film	Best Fantasy Film
**Return of the Jedi**; Blue Thunder; Brainstorm; Strange Invaders; WarGames	**Something Wicked This Way Comes**; High Road to China; Krull; Never Say Never Again; Octopussy
Best Horror Film	
**The Dead Zone**; Christine; Cujo; The Keep; Twilight Zone: The Movie	
Best Actor	Best Actress
**Mark Hamill – Return of the Jedi** as Luke Skywalker; Matthew Broderick – WarGames as David Lightman; Christopher Reeve – Superman III as Clark Kent / Superman; Roy Scheider – Blue Thunder as Officer Frank Murphy; Christopher Walken – The Dead Zone as Johnny Smith	**Louise Fletcher – Brainstorm** as Lillian Reynolds; Bess Armstrong – High Road to China as Eve "Evie" Tozer; Bobbie Bresee – Mausoleum as Susan Walker Farrell; Carrie Fisher – Return of the Jedi as Princess Leia; Ally Sheedy – WarGames as Jennifer Mack
Best Supporting Actor	Best Supporting Actress
**John Lithgow – Twilight Zone: The Movie** as John Valentine; Scatman Crothers – Twilight Zone: The Movie as Mr. Bloom; Jonathan Pryce – Something Wicked This Way Comes as Mr. Dark; Billy Dee Williams – Return of the Jedi as Lando Calrissian; John Wood – WarGames as Dr. Stephen Falken	**Candy Clark – Blue Thunder** as Kate; Maud Adams – Octopussy as Octopussy; Annette O'Toole – Superman III as Lana Lang; Meg Tilly – Psycho II as Mary Loomis; Natalie Wood – Brainstorm as Karen Brace (posthumous)
Best Director	Best Writing
**John Badham – WarGames**; Woody Allen – Zelig; David Cronenberg – The Dead Zone; Richard Marquand – Return of the Jedi; Douglas Trumbull – Brainstorm	**Ray Bradbury – Something Wicked This Way Comes**; Jeffrey Boam – The Dead Zone; Lawrence Kasdan, George Lucas – Return of the Jedi; Bill Condon, Michael Laughlin – Strange Invaders; Lawrence Lasker, Walter F. Parkes – WarGames
Best Music	Best Costumes
**James Horner – Brainstorm**; Charles Bernstein – The Entity; James Horner – Krull; John Williams – Return of the Jedi; James Horner – Something Wicked This Way Comes	**Aggie Guerard Rodgers and Nilo Rodis-Jamero – Return of the Jedi**; Milena Canonero – The Hunger; Anthony Mendleson – Krull; Tom Rand – The Pirates of Penzance; Ruth Myers – Something Wicked This Way Comes
Best Make-up	Best Special Effects
**Phil Tippett and Stuart Freeborn – Return of the Jedi**; Dick Smith, Carl Fullerton – The Hunger; James R. Scribner – Nightmares; Gary Liddiard, James R. Scribner – Something Wicked This Way Comes; Ken Brooke – Strange Invaders	**Richard Edlund, Dennis Muren, and Ken Ralston – Return of the Jedi**; (Entertainment Effects Group) – Brainstorm; Ian Wingrove – Never Say Never Again; Lee Dyer – Something Wicked This Way Comes; Chuck Comisky, Kenneth Jones, Lawrence E. Benson (Private Stock Effects Inc.) – Strange Invaders

=== Special awards ===
==== George Pal Memorial Award ====
- Nicholas Meyer

==== President's Award ====
- Roger Corman
