= Saturn Award for Best Horror Film =

Film award

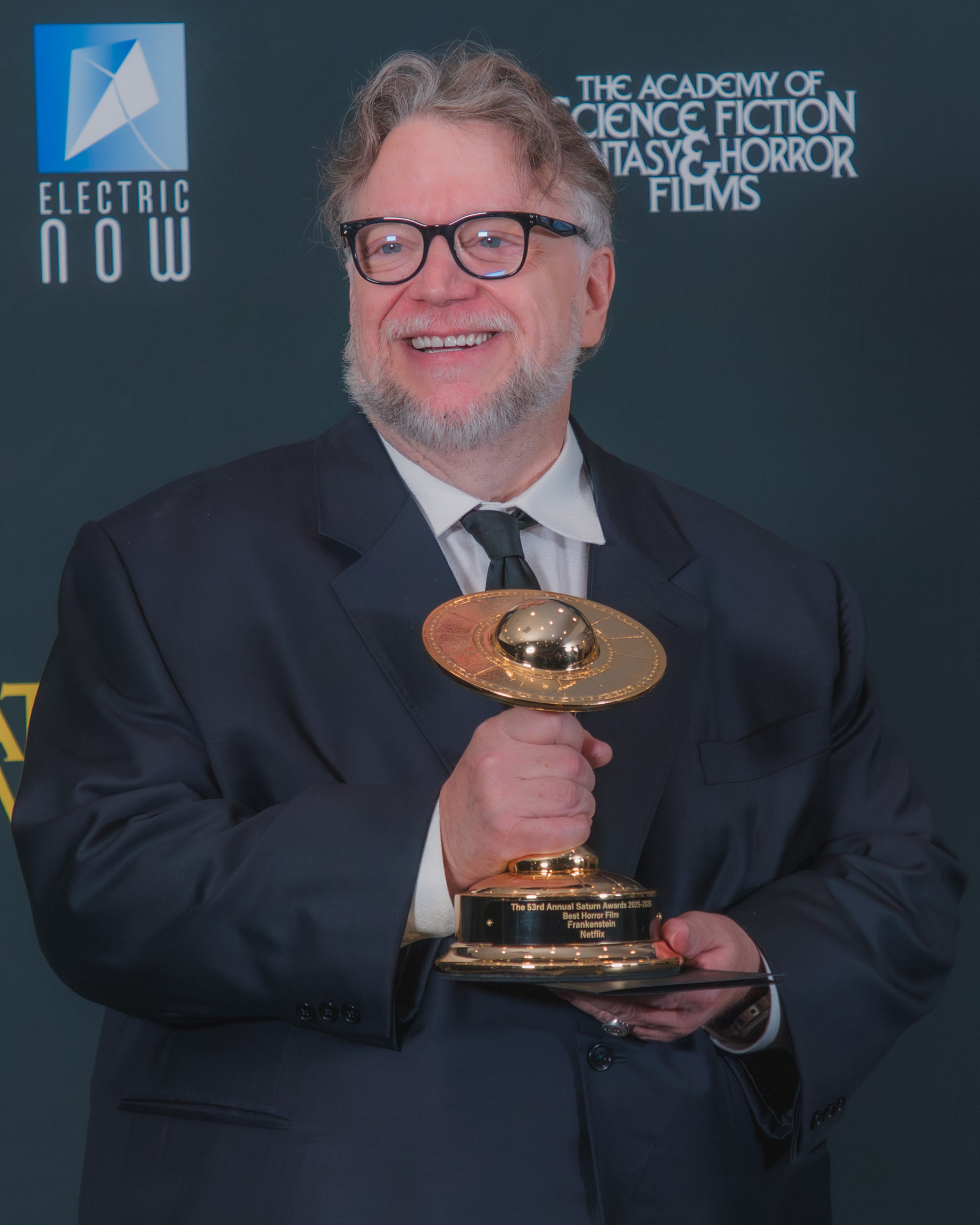
- The 2024/2025 recipient for Frankenstein
- Awarded for: Best motion picture of the year in the horror genre
- Country: United States
- Presented by: Academy of Science Fiction, Fantasy and Horror Films
- First award: 1972
- Currently held by: Frankenstein (2024/2025)
- Website: www.saturnawards.org

The Saturn Awards for Best Horror Film is an award presented to the best film in the horror genre by the Academy of Science Fiction, Fantasy and Horror Films.

It was introduced in 1973 for the 1972 film year. For the 2010, 2011 and 2012 film years, it was renamed Best Horror or Thriller Film (with the Best Action, Adventure or Thriller Film category becoming Best Action or Adventure Film). In 2013 the award came back to its original form, with a new Best Thriller Film award being created.

== Winners and nominees ==
In the list below, winners are listed first in bold, followed by the other nominees.

=== 1970s ===
Year	Film
1972 **(1st)**	**Blacula**
1973 **(2nd)**	**The Exorcist**
1973 **(2nd)**	Arnold
1973 **(2nd)**	Death Line
1973 **(2nd)**	Don't Look Now
1973 **(2nd)**	The Legend of Hell House
1973 **(2nd)**	Schlock
1973 **(2nd)**	Scream Blacula Scream
1973 **(2nd)**	Sisters
1973 **(2nd)**	Tales That Witness Madness
1973 **(2nd)**	Terror at Red Wolf Inn
1973 **(2nd)**	Terror in the Wax Museum
1973 **(2nd)**	Theater of Blood
1973 **(2nd)**	The Vault of Horror
1974/1975 **(3rd)**	**Young Frankenstein**
1974/1975 **(3rd)**	Black Christmas
1974/1975 **(3rd)**	Bug
1974/1975 **(3rd)**	Phantom of the Paradise
1974/1975 **(3rd)**	The Rocky Horror Picture Show
1974/1975 **(3rd)**	Vampira
1976 **(4th)**	**Burnt Offerings**
1976 **(4th)**	Carrie
1976 **(4th)**	Eaten Alive
1976 **(4th)**	The Food of the Gods
1976 **(4th)**	House of Mortal Sin
1976 **(4th)**	Obsession
1976 **(4th)**	The Omen
1977 **(5th)**	**The Little Girl Who Lives Down the Lane**
1977 **(5th)**	Dogs
1977 **(5th)**	Kingdom of the Spiders
1977 **(5th)**	The Sentinel
1978 **(6th)**	**The Wicker Man**
1978 **(6th)**	Dawn of the Dead
1978 **(6th)**	Halloween
1978 **(6th)**	Magic
1978 **(6th)**	The Medusa Touch
1978 **(6th)**	Piranha
1979 **(7th)**	**Dracula**
1979 **(7th)**	The Amityville Horror
1979 **(7th)**	Love at First Bite
1979 **(7th)**	The Mafu Cage
1979 **(7th)**	Phantasm

=== 1980s ===
Year	Film
1980 **(8th)**	**The Howling**
1980 **(8th)**	Dressed to Kill
1980 **(8th)**	Fade to Black
1980 **(8th)**	The Fog
1980 **(8th)**	The Shining
1981 **(9th)**	**An American Werewolf in London**
1981 **(9th)**	Dead & Buried
1981 **(9th)**	Ghost Story
1981 **(9th)**	Halloween II
1981 **(9th)**	Wolfen
1982 **(10th)**	**Poltergeist**
1982 **(10th)**	Creepshow
1982 **(10th)**	Deathtrap
1982 **(10th)**	Swamp Thing
1982 **(10th)**	The Thing
1983 **(11th)**	**The Dead Zone**
1983 **(11th)**	Christine
1983 **(11th)**	Cujo
1983 **(11th)**	The Keep
1983 **(11th)**	Twilight Zone: The Movie
1984 **(12th)**	**Gremlins**
1984 **(12th)**	Creature
1984 **(12th)**	Dreamscape
1984 **(12th)**	Firestarter
1984 **(12th)**	A Nightmare on Elm Street
1985 **(13th)**	**Fright Night**
1985 **(13th)**	Lifeforce
1985 **(13th)**	A Nightmare on Elm Street 2: Freddy's Revenge
1985 **(13th)**	Re-Animator
1985 **(13th)**	The Return of the Living Dead
1986 **(14th)**	**The Fly**
1986 **(14th)**	From Beyond
1986 **(14th)**	Little Shop of Horrors
1986 **(14th)**	Poltergeist II: The Other Side
1986 **(14th)**	Psycho III
1987 **(15th)**	**The Lost Boys**
1987 **(15th)**	Evil Dead II
1987 **(15th)**	Hellraiser
1987 **(15th)**	Near Dark
1987 **(15th)**	A Nightmare on Elm Street 3: Dream Warriors
1987 **(15th)**	Pumpkinhead
1988 **(16th)**	**Beetlejuice**
1988 **(16th)**	Child's Play
1988 **(16th)**	Dead Ringers
1988 **(16th)**	Halloween 4: The Return of Michael Myers
1988 **(16th)**	Hellbound: Hellraiser II
1988 **(16th)**	A Nightmare on Elm Street 4: The Dream Master
1988 **(16th)**	Waxwork
1989/1990 **(17th)**	**Arachnophobia**
1989/1990 **(17th)**	Bride of Re-Animator
1989/1990 **(17th)**	Darkman
1989/1990 **(17th)**	The Exorcist III
1989/1990 **(17th)**	The Fly II
1989/1990 **(17th)**	The Guardian
1989/1990 **(17th)**	Nightbreed
1989/1990 **(17th)**	Pet Sematary
1989/1990 **(17th)**	Santa Sangre

=== 1990s ===
Year	Film
1991 **(18th)**	**The Silence of the Lambs**
1991 **(18th)**	Body Parts
1991 **(18th)**	Child's Play 3
1991 **(18th)**	Children of the Night
1991 **(18th)**	Dolly Dearest
1991 **(18th)**	Misery
1991 **(18th)**	Night of the Living Dead
1991 **(18th)**	Sleeping with the Enemy
1992 **(19th)**	**Bram Stoker's Dracula**
1992 **(19th)**	Basic Instinct
1992 **(19th)**	Candyman
1992 **(19th)**	Dead Alive
1992 **(19th)**	The Hand That Rocks the Cradle
1992 **(19th)**	Hellraiser III: Hell on Earth
1992 **(19th)**	Twin Peaks: Fire Walk with Me
1993 **(20th)**	**Army of Darkness**
1993 **(20th)**	The Dark Half
1993 **(20th)**	The Good Son
1993 **(20th)**	Hard Target
1993 **(20th)**	Kalifornia
1993 **(20th)**	Needful Things
1993 **(20th)**	The Vanishing
1994 **(21st)**	**Interview with the Vampire**
1994 **(21st)**	Cronos
1994 **(21st)**	The Crow
1994 **(21st)**	Mary Shelley's Frankenstein
1994 **(21st)**	Mosquito
1994 **(21st)**	Wes Craven's New Nightmare
1994 **(21st)**	Wolf
1995 **(22nd)**	**From Dusk till Dawn**
1995 **(22nd)**	The City of Lost Children
1995 **(22nd)**	In the Mouth of Madness
1995 **(22nd)**	Lord of Illusions
1995 **(22nd)**	Mute Witness
1995 **(22nd)**	The Prophecy
1995 **(22nd)**	Tales from the Crypt: Demon Knight
1996 **(23rd)**	**Scream**
1996 **(23rd)**	Cemetery Man
1996 **(23rd)**	The Craft
1996 **(23rd)**	Curdled
1996 **(23rd)**	The Frighteners
1996 **(23rd)**	The Relic
1997 **(24th)**	**The Devil's Advocate**
1997 **(24th)**	Anaconda
1997 **(24th)**	I Know What You Did Last Summer
1997 **(24th)**	Mimic
1997 **(24th)**	Phantoms
1997 **(24th)**	Scream 2
1998 **(25th)**	**Apt Pupil**
1998 **(25th)**	Blade
1998 **(25th)**	Bride of Chucky
1998 **(25th)**	The Faculty
1998 **(25th)**	Halloween H20: 20 Years Later
1998 **(25th)**	Vampires
1999 **(26th)**	**The Sixth Sense**
1999 **(26th)**	The Blair Witch Project
1999 **(26th)**	Ravenous
1999 **(26th)**	Sleepy Hollow
1999 **(26th)**	Stigmata
1999 **(26th)**	Teaching Mrs. Tingle

=== 2000s ===
Year	Film
2000 **(27th)**	**Final Destination**
2000 **(27th)**	Dracula 2000
2000 **(27th)**	The Gift
2000 **(27th)**	Requiem for a Dream
2000 **(27th)**	Urban Legends: Final Cut
2000 **(27th)**	What Lies Beneath
2001 **(28th)**	**The Others**
2001 **(28th)**	The Devil's Backbone
2001 **(28th)**	From Hell
2001 **(28th)**	Hannibal
2001 **(28th)**	Jeepers Creepers
2001 **(28th)**	Thirteen Ghosts
2002 **(29th)**	**The Ring**
2002 **(29th)**	Blade II
2002 **(29th)**	Eight Legged Freaks
2002 **(29th)**	Frailty
2002 **(29th)**	Queen of the Damned
2002 **(29th)**	Resident Evil
2003 **(30th)**	**28 Days Later**
2003 **(30th)**	Cabin Fever
2003 **(30th)**	Final Destination 2
2003 **(30th)**	Freddy vs. Jason
2003 **(30th)**	Jeepers Creepers II
2003 **(30th)**	The Texas Chainsaw Massacre
2003 **(30th)**	Underworld
2004 **(31st)**	**Shaun of the Dead**
2004 **(31st)**	Blade: Trinity
2004 **(31st)**	Dawn of the Dead
2004 **(31st)**	The Grudge
2004 **(31st)**	Open Water
2004 **(31st)**	Saw
2004 **(31st)**	Van Helsing
2005 **(32nd)**	**The Exorcism of Emily Rose**
2005 **(32nd)**	Constantine
2005 **(32nd)**	Land of the Dead
2005 **(32nd)**	Saw II
2005 **(32nd)**	The Skeleton Key
2005 **(32nd)**	Wolf Creek
2006 **(33rd)**	**The Descent**
2006 **(33rd)**	Final Destination 3
2006 **(33rd)**	Hostel
2006 **(33rd)**	Saw III
2006 **(33rd)**	Slither
2006 **(33rd)**	Snakes on a Plane
2007 **(34th)**	**Sweeney Todd: The Demon Barber of Fleet Street**
2007 **(34th)**	Ghost Rider
2007 **(34th)**	Grindhouse
2007 **(34th)**	The Mist
2007 **(34th)**	30 Days of Night
2007 **(34th)**	1408
2008 **(35th)**	**Hellboy II: The Golden Army**
2008 **(35th)**	The Happening
2008 **(35th)**	The Mummy: Tomb of the Dragon Emperor
2008 **(35th)**	Quarantine
2008 **(35th)**	Splinter
2008 **(35th)**	The Strangers
2009 **(36th)**	**Drag Me to Hell**
2009 **(36th)**	The Box
2009 **(36th)**	Frozen
2009 **(36th)**	The Last House on the Left
2009 **(36th)**	The Twilight Saga: New Moon
2009 **(36th)**	Zombieland

=== 2010s ===
Year	Film
2010 **(37th)**	**Let Me In**
2010 **(37th)**	The American
2010 **(37th)**	Black Swan
2010 **(37th)**	Kick-Ass
2010 **(37th)**	Shutter Island
2010 **(37th)**	The Wolfman
2011 **(38th)**	**The Girl with the Dragon Tattoo**
2011 **(38th)**	Contagion
2011 **(38th)**	The Devil's Double
2011 **(38th)**	The Grey
2011 **(38th)**	Take Shelter
2011 **(38th)**	The Thing
2012 **(39th)**	**The Cabin in the Woods**
2012 **(39th)**	Argo
2012 **(39th)**	The Impossible
2012 **(39th)**	Seven Psychopaths
2012 **(39th)**	The Woman in Black
2012 **(39th)**	Zero Dark Thirty
2013 **(40th)**	**The Conjuring**
2013 **(40th)**	Carrie
2013 **(40th)**	Mama
2013 **(40th)**	The Purge
2013 **(40th)**	This Is the End
2013 **(40th)**	Warm Bodies
2014 **(41st)**	**Dracula Untold**
2014 **(41st)**	Annabelle
2014 **(41st)**	The Babadook
2014 **(41st)**	Horns
2014 **(41st)**	Only Lovers Left Alive
2014 **(41st)**	The Purge: Anarchy
2015 **(42nd)**	**Crimson Peak**
2015 **(42nd)**	Insidious: Chapter 3
2015 **(42nd)**	It Follows
2015 **(42nd)**	Krampus
2015 **(42nd)**	The Visit
2015 **(42nd)**	What We Do in the Shadows
2016 **(43rd)**	**Don't Breathe**
2016 **(43rd)**	The Autopsy of Jane Doe
2016 **(43rd)**	The Conjuring 2
2016 **(43rd)**	Demon
2016 **(43rd)**	Ouija: Origin of Evil
2016 **(43rd)**	Train to Busan
2016 **(43rd)**	The Witch
2017 **(44th)**	**Get Out**
2017 **(44th)**	Annabelle: Creation
2017 **(44th)**	Better Watch Out
2017 **(44th)**	47 Meters Down
2017 **(44th)**	It
2017 **(44th)**	Mother!
2018/2019 **(45th)**	**A Quiet Place**
2018/2019 **(45th)**	The Dead Don't Die
2018/2019 **(45th)**	Halloween
2018/2019 **(45th)**	Hereditary
2018/2019 **(45th)**	Overlord
2018/2019 **(45th)**	Pet Sematary
2018/2019 **(45th)**	Us
2019/2020 **(46th)**	**The Invisible Man**
2019/2020 **(46th)**	Doctor Sleep
2019/2020 **(46th)**	Freaky
2019/2020 **(46th)**	It Chapter Two
2019/2020 **(46th)**	Midsommar
2019/2020 **(46th)**	Ready or Not
2019/2020 **(46th)**	Scary Stories to Tell in the Dark

=== 2020s ===
Year	Film
2021/2022 **(50th)**	**The Black Phone**
2021/2022 **(50th)**	A Quiet Place Part II
2021/2022 **(50th)**	Last Night in Soho
2021/2022 **(50th)**	The Night House
2021/2022 **(50th)**	Scream
2021/2022 **(50th)**	X
2022/2023 **(51st)**	**Talk to Me**
2022/2023 **(51st)**	Barbarian
2022/2023 **(51st)**	Evil Dead Rise
2022/2023 **(51st)**	Insidious: The Red Door
2022/2023 **(51st)**	Renfield
2022/2023 **(51st)**	Scream VI
2022/2023 **(51st)**	Smile
2023/2024 **(52nd)**	**Alien: Romulus**
2023/2024 **(52nd)**	Abigail
2023/2024 **(52nd)**	The First Omen
2023/2024 **(52nd)**	In a Violent Nature
2023/2024 **(52nd)**	Longlegs
2023/2024 **(52nd)**	A Quiet Place: Day One
2023/2024 **(52nd)**	Smile 2
2024/2025 **(53rd)**	**Frankenstein**
2024/2025 **(53rd)**	28 Years Later
2024/2025 **(53rd)**	The Conjuring: Last Rites
2024/2025 **(53rd)**	Final Destination Bloodlines
2024/2025 **(53rd)**	The Monkey
2024/2025 **(53rd)**	Weapons

== See also ==
- Horror film
