= Saturn Award for Best Fantasy Film =

Film award

- Awarded for: Best motion picture of the year in the fantasy genre
- Country: United States
- Presented by: Academy of Science Fiction, Fantasy and Horror Films
- First award: 1973
- Currently held by: Wicked: For Good (2024/2025)
- Website: www.saturnawards.org

The Saturn Awards for Best Fantasy Film is an award presented to the best film in the fantasy genre by the Academy of Science Fiction, Fantasy and Horror Films.

== Winners and nominees ==
=== 1970s ===
Year	Motion Picture
1973 (2nd)	The Golden Voyage of Sinbad
1974/1975 (3rd)	Doc Savage: The Man of Bronze
1976 (4th)	The Holes (Les gaspards)
1976 (4th)	At the Earth's Core
1976 (4th)	The Blue Bird
1976 (4th)	Bugsy Malone
1976 (4th)	The Seven-Per-Cent Solution
1977 (5th)	Oh, God!
1977 (5th)	Pete's Dragon
1977 (5th)	Sinbad and the Eye of the Tiger
1977 (5th)	The Slipper and the Rose: The Story of Cinderella
1977 (5th)	Wizards
1978 (6th)	Heaven Can Wait
1978 (6th)	The Lord of the Rings
1978 (6th)	The Marvelous Visit (La merveilleuse visite)
1978 (6th)	Watership Down
1978 (6th)	The Wiz
1979 (7th)	The Muppet Movie
1979 (7th)	Arabian Adventure
1979 (7th)	Dinner for Adele
1979 (7th)	The Last Wave
1979 (7th)	Nutcracker Fantasy

=== 1980s ===
Year	Motion Picture
1980 (8th)	Somewhere in Time
1980 (8th)	The Blue Lagoon
1980 (8th)	The Ninth Configuration
1980 (8th)	Oh, God! Book II
1980 (8th)	Popeye
1981 (9th)	Raiders of the Lost Ark
1981 (9th)	Clash of the Titans
1981 (9th)	Dragonslayer
1981 (9th)	Excalibur
1981 (9th)	The Fox and the Hound
1982 (10th)	The Dark Crystal
1982 (10th)	Conan the Barbarian
1982 (10th)	The Secret of NIMH
1982 (10th)	The Sword and the Sorcerer
1982 (10th)	Zapped!
1983 (11th)	Something Wicked This Way Comes
1983 (11th)	High Road to China
1983 (11th)	Krull
1983 (11th)	Never Say Never Again
1983 (11th)	Octopussy
1984 (12th)	Ghostbusters
1984 (12th)	Greystoke: The Legend of Tarzan, Lord of the Apes
1984 (12th)	Indiana Jones and the Temple of Doom
1984 (12th)	The NeverEnding Story
1984 (12th)	Splash
1985 (13th)	Ladyhawke
1985 (13th)	Remo Williams: The Adventure Begins
1985 (13th)	Return to Oz
1985 (13th)	The Purple Rose of Cairo
1985 (13th)	Young Sherlock Holmes
1986 (14th)	The Boy Who Could Fly
1986 (14th)	An American Tail
1986 (14th)	"Crocodile" Dundee
1986 (14th)	The Golden Child
1986 (14th)	Labyrinth
1987 (15th)	The Princess Bride
1987 (15th)	Batteries Not Included
1987 (15th)	Date with an Angel
1987 (15th)	Harry and the Hendersons
1987 (15th)	The Living Daylights
1987 (15th)	The Witches of Eastwick
1988 (16th)	Who Framed Roger Rabbit
1988 (16th)	Big
1988 (16th)	The Land Before Time
1988 (16th)	Scrooged
1988 (16th)	Willow
1988 (16th)	Without a Clue
1989/1990 (17th)	Ghost
1989/1990 (17th)	The Adventures of Baron Munchausen
1989/1990 (17th)	Always
1989/1990 (17th)	Batman
1989/1990 (17th)	Dick Tracy
1989/1990 (17th)	Field of Dreams
1989/1990 (17th)	Gremlins 2: The New Batch
1989/1990 (17th)	Indiana Jones and the Last Crusade
1989/1990 (17th)	Teenage Mutant Ninja Turtles

=== 1990s ===
Year	Motion Picture
1991 (18th)	Edward Scissorhands
1991 (18th)	Defending Your Life
1991 (18th)	The Fisher King
1991 (18th)	If Looks Could Kill
1991 (18th)	Robin Hood: Prince of Thieves
1991 (18th)	Warlock
1992 (19th)	Aladdin
1992 (19th)	The Addams Family
1992 (19th)	Batman Returns
1992 (19th)	Beauty and the Beast
1992 (19th)	Death Becomes Her
1992 (19th)	Hook
1992 (19th)	Toys
1993 (20th)	The Nightmare Before Christmas
1993 (20th)	Addams Family Values
1993 (20th)	Groundhog Day
1993 (20th)	Heart and Souls
1993 (20th)	Hocus Pocus
1993 (20th)	Last Action Hero
1993 (20th)	Rookie of the Year
1994 (21st)	Forrest Gump
1994 (21st)	Angels in the Outfield
1994 (21st)	Ed Wood
1994 (21st)	The Flintstones
1994 (21st)	The Lion King
1994 (21st)	The Mask
1994 (21st)	The Santa Clause
1995 (22nd)	Babe
1995 (22nd)	Batman Forever
1995 (22nd)	Casper
1995 (22nd)	Fluke
1995 (22nd)	The Indian in the Cupboard
1995 (22nd)	Jumanji
1995 (22nd)	Toy Story
1996 (23rd)	Dragonheart
1996 (23rd)	The Adventures of Pinocchio
1996 (23rd)	The Hunchback of Notre Dame
1996 (23rd)	James and the Giant Peach
1996 (23rd)	Matilda
1996 (23rd)	The Nutty Professor
1996 (23rd)	Phenomenon
1997 (24th)	Austin Powers: International Man of Mystery
1997 (24th)	Batman & Robin
1997 (24th)	George of the Jungle
1997 (24th)	Hercules
1997 (24th)	The Lost World: Jurassic Park
1997 (24th)	MouseHunt
1998 (25th)	The Truman Show
1998 (25th)	Babe: Pig in the City
1998 (25th)	A Bug's Life
1998 (25th)	City of Angels
1998 (25th)	Godzilla
1998 (25th)	Pleasantville
1999 (26th)	Being John Malkovich
1999 (26th)	Austin Powers: The Spy Who Shagged Me
1999 (26th)	The Mummy
1999 (26th)	Stuart Little
1999 (26th)	Tarzan
1999 (26th)	Toy Story 2

=== 2000s ===
Year	Motion Picture
2000 (27th)	Frequency
2000 (27th)	Chicken Run
2000 (27th)	Dinosaur
2000 (27th)	The Family Man
2000 (27th)	How the Grinch Stole Christmas
2000 (27th)	What Women Want
2001 (28th)	The Lord of the Rings: The Fellowship of the Ring
2001 (28th)	Harry Potter and the Philosopher's Stone
2001 (28th)	Monsters, Inc.
2001 (28th)	The Mummy Returns
2001 (28th)	Shrek
2001 (28th)	Spy Kids
2002 (29th)	The Lord of the Rings: The Two Towers
2002 (29th)	Harry Potter and the Chamber of Secrets
2002 (29th)	Reign of Fire
2002 (29th)	The Santa Clause 2
2002 (29th)	The Scorpion King
2002 (29th)	Spider-Man
2003 (30th)	The Lord of the Rings: The Return of the King
2003 (30th)	Big Fish
2003 (30th)	Freaky Friday
2003 (30th)	The League of Extraordinary Gentlemen
2003 (30th)	Peter Pan
2003 (30th)	Pirates of the Caribbean: The Curse of the Black Pearl
2004 (31st)	Spider-Man 2
2004 (31st)	Birth
2004 (31st)	Harry Potter and the Prisoner of Azkaban
2004 (31st)	Hellboy
2004 (31st)	House of Flying Daggers
2004 (31st)	Lemony Snicket's A Series of Unfortunate Events
2005 (32nd)	Batman Begins
2005 (32nd)	Charlie and the Chocolate Factory
2005 (32nd)	The Chronicles of Narnia: The Lion, the Witch and the Wardrobe
2005 (32nd)	Harry Potter and the Goblet of Fire
2005 (32nd)	King Kong
2005 (32nd)	Zathura: A Space Adventure
2006 (33rd)	Superman Returns
2006 (33rd)	Charlotte's Web
2006 (33rd)	Eragon
2006 (33rd)	Night at the Museum
2006 (33rd)	Pirates of the Caribbean: Dead Man's Chest
2006 (33rd)	Stranger than Fiction
2007 (34th)	Enchanted
2007 (34th)	The Golden Compass
2007 (34th)	Harry Potter and the Order of the Phoenix
2007 (34th)	Pirates of the Caribbean: At World's End
2007 (34th)	Spider-Man 3
2007 (34th)	Stardust
2008 (35th)	The Curious Case of Benjamin Button
2008 (35th)	The Chronicles of Narnia: Prince Caspian
2008 (35th)	Hancock
2008 (35th)	The Spiderwick Chronicles
2008 (35th)	Twilight
2008 (35th)	Wanted
2009 (36th)	Watchmen
2009 (36th)	Harry Potter and the Half-Blood Prince
2009 (36th)	The Lovely Bones
2009 (36th)	The Time Traveler's Wife
2009 (36th)	Where the Wild Things Are

=== 2010s ===
Year	Motion Picture
2010 (37th)	Alice in Wonderland
2010 (37th)	The Chronicles of Narnia: The Voyage of the Dawn Treader
2010 (37th)	Clash of the Titans
2010 (37th)	Harry Potter and the Deathly Hallows – Part 1
2010 (37th)	Scott Pilgrim vs. the World
2010 (37th)	The Twilight Saga: Eclipse
2011 (38th)	Harry Potter and the Deathly Hallows – Part 2
2011 (38th)	Hugo
2011 (38th)	Immortals
2011 (38th)	Midnight in Paris
2011 (38th)	The Muppets
2011 (38th)	Thor
2012 (39th)	Life of Pi
2012 (39th)	The Amazing Spider-Man
2012 (39th)	The Hobbit: An Unexpected Journey
2012 (39th)	Ruby Sparks
2012 (39th)	Snow White and the Huntsman
2012 (39th)	Ted
2013 (40th)	Her
2013 (40th)	About Time
2013 (40th)	The Hobbit: The Desolation of Smaug
2013 (40th)	Jack the Giant Slayer
2013 (40th)	Oz the Great and Powerful
2013 (40th)	The Secret Life of Walter Mitty
2014 (41st)	The Hobbit: The Battle of the Five Armies
2014 (41st)	Birdman
2014 (41st)	The Grand Budapest Hotel
2014 (41st)	Into the Woods
2014 (41st)	Maleficent
2014 (41st)	Paddington
2015 (42nd)	Cinderella
2015 (42nd)	The Age of Adaline
2015 (42nd)	Baahubali: The Beginning
2015 (42nd)	Goosebumps
2015 (42nd)	The Hunger Games: Mockingjay – Part 2
2015 (42nd)	Ted 2
2016 (43rd)	The Jungle Book
2016 (43rd)	The BFG
2016 (43rd)	Fantastic Beasts and Where to Find Them
2016 (43rd)	Ghostbusters
2016 (43rd)	Miss Peregrine's Home for Peculiar Children
2016 (43rd)	A Monster Calls
2016 (43rd)	Pete's Dragon
2017 (44th)	The Shape of Water
2017 (44th)	Beauty and the Beast
2017 (44th)	Downsizing
2017 (44th)	Jumanji: Welcome to the Jungle
2017 (44th)	Kong: Skull Island
2017 (44th)	Paddington 2
2018/2019 (45th)	Toy Story 4
2018/2019 (45th)	Aladdin
2018/2019 (45th)	Dumbo
2018/2019 (45th)	Fantastic Beasts: The Crimes of Grindelwald
2018/2019 (45th)	Godzilla: King of the Monsters
2018/2019 (45th)	Mary Poppins Returns
2018/2019 (45th)	Yesterday
2019/2020 (46th)	Once Upon a Time in Hollywood
2019/2020 (46th)	Bill & Ted Face the Music
2019/2020 (46th)	Jumanji: The Next Level
2019/2020 (46th)	The Lion King
2019/2020 (46th)	Maleficent: Mistress of Evil
2019/2020 (46th)	Sonic the Hedgehog
2019/2020 (46th)	The Witches

=== 2020s ===
Year	Film
2021/2022 (50th)
2021/2022 (50th)	Everything Everywhere All at Once
2021/2022 (50th)	Cruella
2021/2022 (50th)	Fantastic Beasts: The Secrets of Dumbledore
2021/2022 (50th)	Ghostbusters: Afterlife
2021/2022 (50th)	The Green Knight
2021/2022 (50th)	The Unbearable Weight of Massive Talent
2022/2023 (51st)
2022/2023 (51st)	Indiana Jones and the Dial of Destiny
2022/2023 (51st)	Barbie
2022/2023 (51st)	Dungeons & Dragons: Honor Among Thieves
2022/2023 (51st)	Haunted Mansion
2022/2023 (51st)	The Little Mermaid
2023/2024 (52nd)	Beetlejuice Beetlejuice
2023/2024 (52nd)	Ghostbusters: Frozen Empire
2023/2024 (52nd)	Godzilla x Kong: The New Empire
2023/2024 (52nd)	My Old Ass
2023/2024 (52nd)	Poor Things
2023/2024 (52nd)	Wonka
2024/2025 (53rd)	Wicked: For Good
2024/2025 (53rd)	Freakier Friday
2024/2025 (53rd)	Hamnet
2024/2025 (53rd)	How to Train Your Dragon
2024/2025 (53rd)	The Life of Chuck
2024/2025 (53rd)	Lilo & Stitch
