= 1st Saturn Awards =

US film and television awards ceremony

- Date: May 18, 1973
- Site: California, U.S.

The 1st Saturn Awards were awarded to media properties and personalities deemed by the Academy of Science Fiction, Fantasy and Horror Films to be the best in science fiction, fantasy and horror released in 1972. But only science fiction and horror were awarded this year, while fantasy would be awarded the following ceremony onward. The inaugural ceremony took place on May 18, 1973.

Below is a complete list of the winners. They are highlighted in bold.

== Winners ==
=== Best Science Fiction Film ===
- **Slaughterhouse-Five**

=== Best Horror Film ===
- **Blacula**
