= 10th Saturn Awards =

US film and television awards ceremony

- Date: July 30, 1983
- Site: California, U.S.

Highlights
- Most awards: E.T. the Extra-Terrestrial (5)
- Most nominations: Star Trek II: The Wrath of Khan, E.T. the Extra-Terrestrial (8)

The 10th Saturn Awards, honoring the best in science fiction, fantasy and horror film in 1982, were held on July 30, 1983.

== Winners and nominees ==
Below is a complete list of nominees and winners. Winners are highlighted in bold.

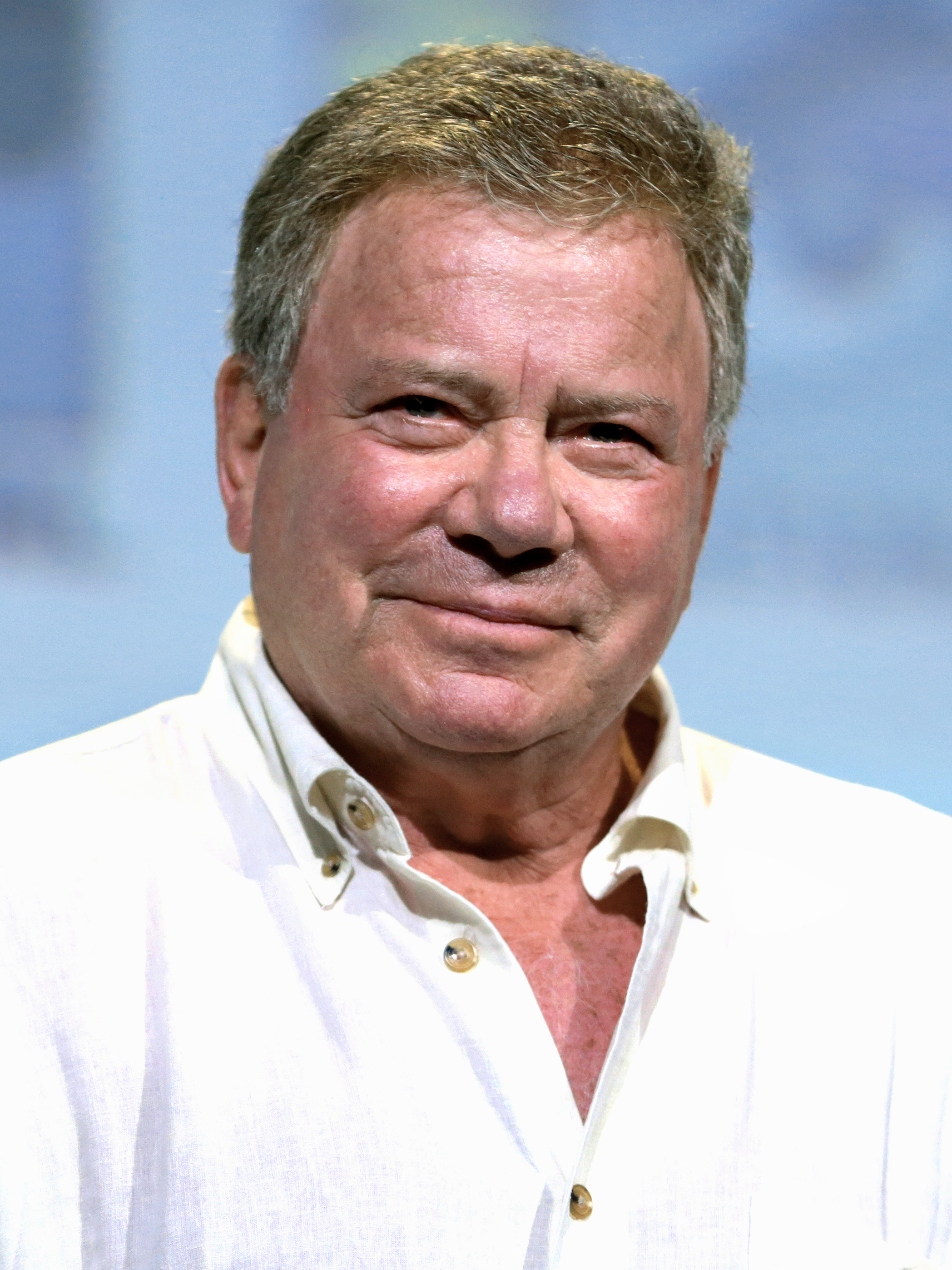
William Shatner, Best Actor winner.

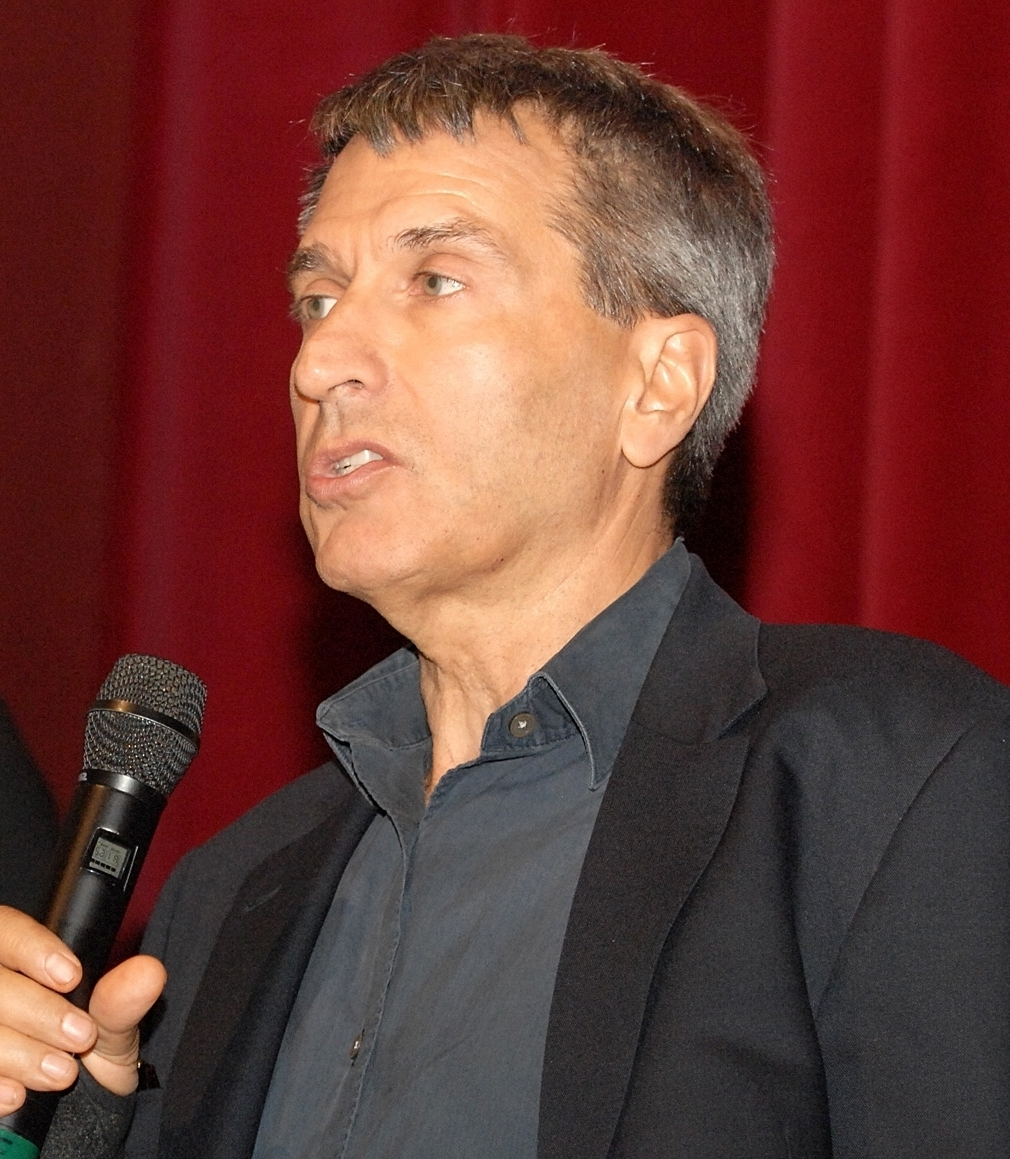
Nicholas Meyer, Best Director winner.

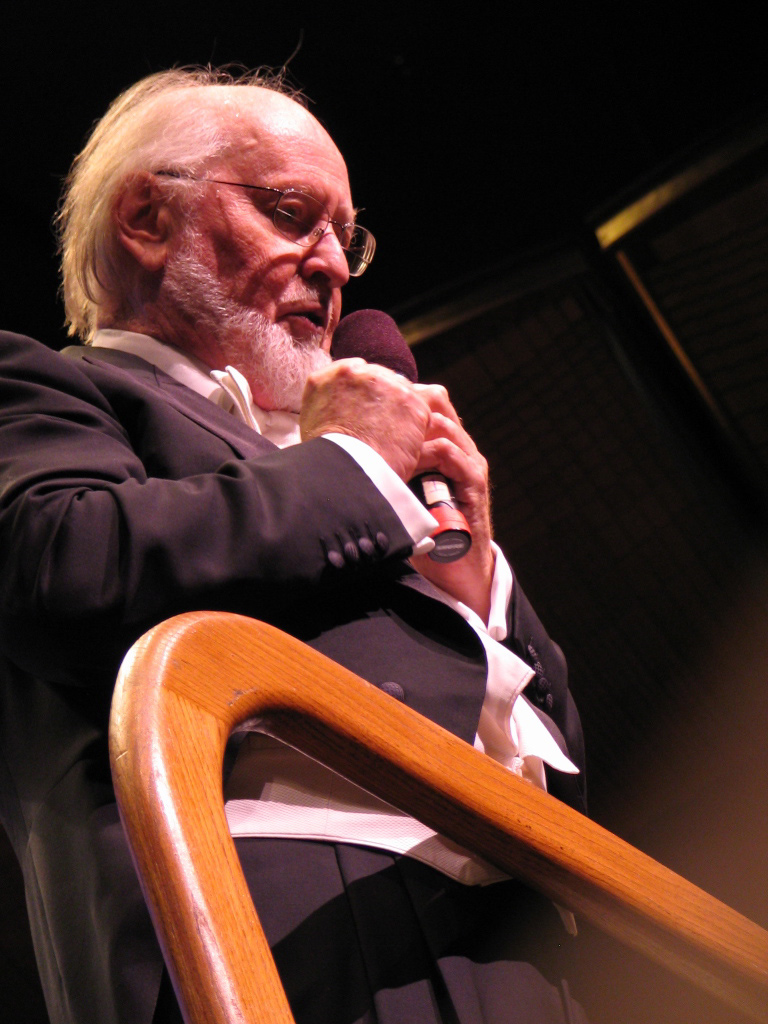
John Williams, Best Music winner.

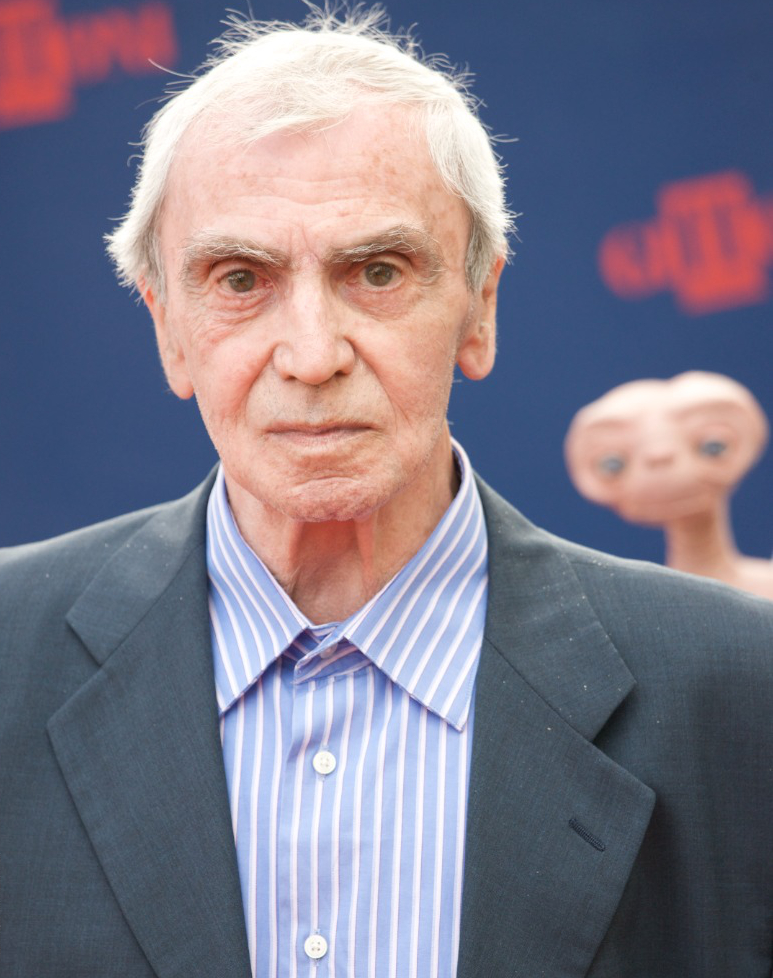
Carlo Rambaldi, Best Special Effects co-winner.

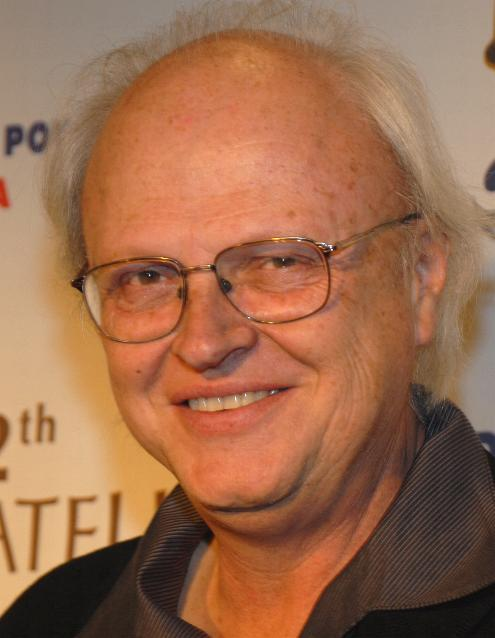
Dennis Muren, Best Special Effects co-winner.

=== Film awards ===
Best Science Fiction Film	Best Fantasy Film
**E.T. the Extra-Terrestrial**; Blade Runner; Endangered Species; Star Trek II: The Wrath of Khan; Tron	**The Dark Crystal**; Conan the Barbarian; The Secret of NIMH; The Sword and the Sorcerer; Zapped!
Best Horror Film	Best Animated Film
**Poltergeist**; Creepshow; Deathtrap; Swamp Thing; The Thing	**The Secret of NIMH**; Phoenix 2772; The Last Unicorn; Les Maîtres du temps; Tron
Best International Film	Best Low-Budget Film
**Mad Max 2: The Road Warrior**; The Chain Reaction; Class of 1984; The House Where Evil Dwells; The Last Horror Film	**The Evil Dead**; Android; Eating Raoul; Forbidden World (Mutant); One Dark Night
Best Actor	Best Actress
**William Shatner – Star Trek II: The Wrath of Khan** as James T. Kirk; Mel Gibson – Mad Max 2 as Max Rockatansky; Lee Horsley – The Sword and the Sorcerer as Prince Talon; Christopher Reeve – Deathtrap as Clifford Anderson; Henry Thomas – E.T. the Extra-Terrestrial as Elliott	**Sandahl Bergman – Conan the Barbarian** as Valeria; Susan George – The House Where Evil Dwells as Laura Fletcher; Nastassja Kinski – Cat People as Irena Gallier; JoBeth Williams – Poltergeist as Diane Freeling; Mary Woronov – Eating Raoul as Mary Bland
Best Supporting Actor	Best Supporting Actress
**Richard Lynch – The Sword and the Sorcerer** as Titus Cromwell; Rutger Hauer – Blade Runner as Roy Batty; Walter Koenig – Star Trek II: The Wrath of Khan as Pavel Chekov; Roddy McDowall – Class of 1984 as Terry Corrigan; Bruce Spence – Mad Max 2 as the Gyro Captain	**Zelda Rubinstein – Poltergeist** as Tangina Barrons; Kirstie Alley – Star Trek II: The Wrath of Khan as Lt. Saavik; Filomena Spagnuolo – The Last Horror Film as Vinny's Mother; Dee Wallace – E.T. the Extra-Terrestrial as Mary; Irene Worth – Deathtrap as Helga ten Dorp
Best Director	Best Writing
**Nicholas Meyer – Star Trek II: The Wrath of Khan**; Tobe Hooper – Poltergeist; George Miller – Mad Max 2; Ridley Scott – Blade Runner; Steven Spielberg – E.T. the Extra-Terrestrial	**Melissa Mathison – E.T. the Extra-Terrestrial**; Jay Presson Allen – Deathtrap; Terry Hayes, George Miller, Brian Hannant – Mad Max 2; Jack B. Sowards – Star Trek II: The Wrath of Khan; Albert Pyun, Tom Karnowski, John V. Stuckmeyer – The Sword and the Sorcerer
Best Music	Best Costumes
**John Williams – E.T. the Extra-Terrestrial**; Basil Poledouris – Conan the Barbarian; Ken Thorne – The House Where Evil Dwells; Jerry Goldsmith – Poltergeist; David Whitaker – The Sword and the Sorcerer	**Elois Jenssen and Rosanna Norton – Tron**; John Bloomfield – Conan the Barbarian; Norma Moriceau – Mad Max 2; Robert Fletcher – Star Trek II: The Wrath of Khan; Christine Boyar – The Sword and the Sorcerer
Best Make-up	Best Special Effects
**Dorothy J. Pearl – Poltergeist**; José Antonio Sánchez – Conan the Barbarian; Sue Dolph – Forbidden World; Hatsuo Nagatomo – The House Where Evil Dwells; Werner Keppler, James Lee McCoy – Star Trek II: The Wrath of Khan	**Carlo Rambaldi and Dennis Muren – E.T. the Extra-Terrestrial**; Douglas Trumbull, Richard Yuricich – Blade Runner; Roy Field, Brian Smithies – The Dark Crystal; Tom Campbell, William T. Conway, John Carl Buechler, Steve Neill – Forbidden World; Rob Bottin – The Thing
Best Poster Art	
**John Alvin – E.T. the Extra-Terrestrial**; Johann Costello – Creepshow; Richard Amsel – The Dark Crystal; Edd Riveria – Halloween III: Season of the Witch; Gerald Scarfe – Pink Floyd – The Wall	

=== Special awards ===
==== Posthumous Award ====
- Buster Crabbe

==== Life Career Award ====
- Martin B. Cohen
