= Saturn Award for Best Music =

Film award for best music

- Awarded for: Best composition of an original score for a genre film of the year
- Country: United States
- Presented by: Academy of Science Fiction, Fantasy and Horror Films
- First award: 1975
- Currently held by: Trent Reznor and Atticus Ross for Tron: Ares (2024/25)
- Website: www.saturnawards.org

The Saturn Award for Best Music is one of the annual awards given by the Academy of Science Fiction, Fantasy and Horror Films. The Saturn Awards, which are the oldest film-specialized awards to reward science fiction, fantasy, and horror achievements (the Hugo Award for Best Dramatic Presentation is the oldest award for science fiction and fantasy films), included the category for the first time as a juried award at the 2nd Saturn Awards in 1975, but was later given out competitively beginning with the 5th Saturn Awards in 1978 onward.

John Williams holds the record for most wins and nominations in this category, with 10 wins out of 23 nominations.

== Winners and nominees ==
=== 1970s ===
| Year | Composer | Film |
|---|---|---|
| 1973 (2nd) | Bernard Herrmann (for his career) | |
| 1974/1975 (3rd) | Miklós Rózsa (for his career) | |
| 1976 (4th) | David Raksin (for his career) | |
| 1977 (5th) | John Williams (TIE) | Close Encounters of the Third Kind |
| 1977 (5th) | John Williams (TIE) | Star Wars |
| 1978 (6th) | John Williams | Superman |
| 1978 (6th) | Paul Giovanni | The Wicker Man |
| 1978 (6th) | Jerry Goldsmith | The Boys from Brazil |
| 1978 (6th) | Jerry Goldsmith | Magic |
| 1978 (6th) | Dave Grusin | Heaven Can Wait |
| 1979 (7th) | Miklós Rózsa | Time After Time |
| 1979 (7th) | John Barry | The Black Hole |
| 1979 (7th) | Jerry Goldsmith | Star Trek: The Motion Picture |
| 1979 (7th) | Ken Thorne | Arabian Adventure |
| 1979 (7th) | Paul Williams | The Muppet Movie |

=== 1980s ===
| Year | Composer(s) | Film |
|---|---|---|
| 1980 (8th) | John Barry | Somewhere in Time |
| 1980 (8th) | Béla Bartók (posthumous) | The Shining |
| 1980 (8th) | Pino Donaggio | Dressed to Kill |
| 1980 (8th) | Maurice Jarre | Resurrection |
| 1980 (8th) | John Williams | The Empire Strikes Back |
| 1981 (9th) | John Williams | Raiders of the Lost Ark |
| 1981 (9th) | Jerry Goldsmith | Outland |
| 1981 (9th) | Laurence Rosenthal | Clash of the Titans |
| 1981 (9th) | Ken Thorne | Superman II |
| 1981 (9th) | Colin Towns | Full Circle |
| 1982 (10th) | John Williams | E.T. the Extra-Terrestrial |
| 1982 (10th) | Jerry Goldsmith | Poltergeist |
| 1982 (10th) | Basil Poledouris | Conan the Barbarian |
| 1982 (10th) | Ken Thorne | The House Where Evil Dwells |
| 1982 (10th) | David Whitaker | The Sword and the Sorcerer |
| 1983 (11th) | James Horner | Brainstorm |
| 1983 (11th) | Charles Bernstein | The Entity |
| 1983 (11th) | James Horner | Krull |
| 1983 (11th) | James Horner | Something Wicked This Way Comes |
| 1983 (11th) | John Williams | Return of the Jedi |
| 1984 (12th) | Jerry Goldsmith | Gremlins |
| 1984 (12th) | Ralph Burns | The Muppets Take Manhattan |
| 1984 (12th) | Michel Colombier | Purple Rain |
| 1984 (12th) | Brad Fiedel | The Terminator |
| 1984 (12th) | Giorgio Moroder and Klaus Doldinger | The NeverEnding Story |
| 1985 (13th) | Bruce Broughton | Young Sherlock Holmes |
| 1985 (13th) | James Horner | Cocoon |
| 1985 (13th) | Maurice Jarre | The Bride |
| 1985 (13th) | Andrew Powell | Ladyhawke |
| 1985 (13th) | Alan Silvestri | Back to the Future |
| 1986 (14th) | Alan Menken | Little Shop of Horrors |
| 1986 (14th) | John Carpenter | Big Trouble in Little China |
| 1986 (14th) | Jerry Goldsmith | Link |
| 1986 (14th) | James Horner | An American Tail |
| 1986 (14th) | Howard Shore | The Fly |
| 1987 (15th) | Alan Silvestri | Predator |
| 1987 (15th) | Bruce Broughton | The Monster Squad |
| 1987 (15th) | John Carpenter | Prince of Darkness |
| 1987 (15th) | J. Peter Robinson | Return of the Living Dead Part II |
| 1987 (15th) | John Williams | The Witches of Eastwick |
| 1987 (15th) | Christopher Young | Hellraiser |
| 1988 (16th) | Christopher Young | Hellbound: Hellraiser II |
| 1988 (16th) | John Carpenter and Alan Howarth | They Live |
| 1988 (16th) | Danny Elfman | Beetlejuice |
| 1988 (16th) | Michael Hoenig | The Blob |
| 1988 (16th) | John Massari | Killer Klowns from Outer Space |
| 1988 (16th) | Howard Shore | Dead Ringers |
| 1988 (16th) | Alan Silvestri | Who Framed Roger Rabbit |
| 1989/1990 (17th) | Alan Silvestri | Back to the Future Part III |
| 1989/1990 (17th) | Simon Boswell | Santa Sangre |
| 1989/1990 (17th) | Jerry Goldsmith | Gremlins 2: The New Batch |
| 1989/1990 (17th) | Jerry Goldsmith | Total Recall |
| 1989/1990 (17th) | James Horner | Honey, I Shrunk the Kids |
| 1989/1990 (17th) | Jack Hues | The Guardian |
| 1989/1990 (17th) | Maurice Jarre | Ghost |
| 1989/1990 (17th) | Stanley Myers | The Witches |
| 1989/1990 (17th) | Alan Silvestri | The Abyss |
| 1989/1990 (17th) | Christopher Young | The Fly II |

=== 1990s ===
| Year | Composer(s) | Film |
|---|---|---|
| 1991 (18th) | Loek Dikker | Body Parts |
| 1991 (18th) | Steve Bartek | Guilty as Charged |
| 1991 (18th) | Danny Elfman | Edward Scissorhands |
| 1991 (18th) | Jerry Goldsmith | Sleeping with the Enemy |
| 1991 (18th) | Jerry Goldsmith | Warlock |
| 1991 (18th) | Howard Shore | The Silence of the Lambs |
| 1992 (19th) | Angelo Badalamenti | Twin Peaks: Fire Walk with Me |
| 1992 (19th) | Jerry Goldsmith | Basic Instinct |
| 1992 (19th) | Wojciech Kilar | Bram Stoker's Dracula |
| 1992 (19th) | Alan Menken | Aladdin |
| 1992 (19th) | Alan Menken | Beauty and the Beast |
| 1992 (19th) | Alan Silvestri | Death Becomes Her |
| 1992 (19th) | Hans Zimmer and Trevor Horn | Toys |
| 1993 (20th) | Danny Elfman | The Nightmare Before Christmas |
| 1993 (20th) | Mark Isham | Fire in the Sky |
| 1993 (20th) | Graeme Revell | Hard Target |
| 1993 (20th) | Marc Shaiman | Addams Family Values |
| 1993 (20th) | Marc Shaiman | Heart and Souls |
| 1993 (20th) | John Williams | Jurassic Park |
| 1993 (20th) | Christopher Young | The Vagrant |
| 1994 (21st) | Howard Shore | Ed Wood |
| 1994 (21st) | Patrick Doyle | Mary Shelley's Frankenstein |
| 1994 (21st) | Elliot Goldenthal | Interview with the Vampire |
| 1994 (21st) | Jerry Goldsmith | The Shadow |
| 1994 (21st) | J. Peter Robinson | Wes Craven's New Nightmare |
| 1994 (21st) | Alan Silvestri | Forrest Gump |
| 1995 (22nd) | John Ottman | The Usual Suspects |
| 1995 (22nd) | Danny Elfman | Dolores Claiborne |
| 1995 (22nd) | James Horner | Braveheart |
| 1995 (22nd) | Howard Shore | Seven |
| 1995 (22nd) | Christopher Young | Copycat |
| 1995 (22nd) | Hans Zimmer | Crimson Tide |
| 1996 (23rd) | Danny Elfman | Mars Attacks! |
| 1996 (23rd) | David Arnold | Independence Day |
| 1996 (23rd) | Randy Edelman | Dragonheart |
| 1996 (23rd) | Danny Elfman | The Frighteners |
| 1996 (23rd) | Nick Glennie-Smith, Hans Zimmer, and Harry Gregson-Williams | The Rock |
| 1996 (23rd) | Jerry Goldsmith | Star Trek: First Contact |
| 1997 (24th) | Danny Elfman | Men in Black |
| 1997 (24th) | David Arnold | Tomorrow Never Dies |
| 1997 (24th) | Michael Nyman | Gattaca |
| 1997 (24th) | John Powell | Face/Off |
| 1997 (24th) | Alan Silvestri | Contact |
| 1997 (24th) | Joseph Vitarelli | Commandments |
| 1998 (25th) | John Carpenter | Vampires |
| 1998 (25th) | George S. Clinton | Wild Things |
| 1998 (25th) | George Fenton | Ever After |
| 1998 (25th) | Thomas Newman | Meet Joe Black |
| 1998 (25th) | Trevor Rabin | Armageddon |
| 1998 (25th) | Hans Zimmer | The Prince of Egypt |
| 1999 (26th) | Danny Elfman | Sleepy Hollow |
| 1999 (26th) | Jerry Goldsmith | The Mummy |
| 1999 (26th) | David Newman | Galaxy Quest |
| 1999 (26th) | Randy Newman | Toy Story 2 |
| 1999 (26th) | Thomas Newman | The Green Mile |
| 1999 (26th) | Michael Nyman and Damon Albarn | Ravenous |

=== 2000s ===
| Year | Composer(s) | Film |
|---|---|---|
| 2000 (27th) | James Horner | How the Grinch Stole Christmas |
| 2000 (27th) | Tan Dun and Yo-Yo Ma | Crouching Tiger, Hidden Dragon |
| 2000 (27th) | Jerry Goldsmith | Hollow Man |
| 2000 (27th) | James Newton Howard | Dinosaur |
| 2000 (27th) | Hans Zimmer and Lisa Gerrard | Gladiator |
| 2000 (27th) | Hans Zimmer and John Powell | The Road to El Dorado |
| 2001 (28th) | John Williams | A.I. Artificial Intelligence |
| 2001 (28th) | Angelo Badalamenti | Mulholland Drive |
| 2001 (28th) | Joseph LoDuca | Brotherhood of the Wolf |
| 2001 (28th) | John Powell and Harry Gregson-Williams | Shrek |
| 2001 (28th) | Howard Shore | The Lord of the Rings: The Fellowship of the Ring |
| 2001 (28th) | Nancy Wilson | Vanilla Sky |
| 2002 (29th) | Danny Elfman | Spider-Man |
| 2002 (29th) | Reinhold Heil and Johnny Klimek | One Hour Photo |
| 2002 (29th) | Joe Hisaishi | Spirited Away |
| 2002 (29th) | Howard Shore | The Lord of the Rings: The Two Towers |
| 2002 (29th) | John Williams | Minority Report |
| 2002 (29th) | John Williams | Star Wars: Episode II – Attack of the Clones |
| 2003 (30th) | Howard Shore | The Lord of the Rings: The Return of the King |
| 2003 (30th) | Klaus Badelt | Pirates of the Caribbean: The Curse of the Black Pearl |
| 2003 (30th) | Danny Elfman | Hulk |
| 2003 (30th) | Jerry Goldsmith | Looney Tunes: Back in Action |
| 2003 (30th) | Thomas Newman | Finding Nemo |
| 2003 (30th) | John Ottman | X2 |
| 2004 (31st) | Alan Silvestri | Van Helsing |
| 2004 (31st) | Danny Elfman | Spider-Man 2 |
| 2004 (31st) | Michael Giacchino | The Incredibles |
| 2004 (31st) | Edward Shearmur | Sky Captain and the World of Tomorrow |
| 2004 (31st) | Alan Silvestri | The Polar Express |
| 2004 (31st) | John Williams | Harry Potter and the Prisoner of Azkaban |
| 2005 (32nd) | John Williams | Star Wars: Episode III – Revenge of the Sith |
| 2005 (32nd) | Patrick Doyle | Harry Potter and the Goblet of Fire |
| 2005 (32nd) | Danny Elfman | Charlie and the Chocolate Factory |
| 2005 (32nd) | James Newton Howard and Hans Zimmer | Batman Begins |
| 2005 (32nd) | John Ottman | Kiss Kiss Bang Bang |
| 2005 (32nd) | John Williams | War of the Worlds |
| 2006 (33rd) | John Ottman | Superman Returns |
| 2006 (33rd) | David Arnold | Casino Royale |
| 2006 (33rd) | Douglas Pipes | Monster House |
| 2006 (33rd) | John Powell | X-Men: The Last Stand |
| 2006 (33rd) | Trevor Rabin | Flyboys |
| 2006 (33rd) | Tom Tykwer, Johnny Klimek, and Reinhold Heil | Perfume: The Story of a Murderer |
| 2007 (34th) | Alan Menken | Enchanted |
| 2007 (34th) | Tyler Bates | 300 |
| 2007 (34th) | Jonny Greenwood | There Will Be Blood |
| 2007 (34th) | Nicholas Hooper | Harry Potter and the Order of the Phoenix |
| 2007 (34th) | Mark Mancina | August Rush |
| 2007 (34th) | John Powell | The Bourne Ultimatum |
| 2008 (35th) | James Newton Howard and Hans Zimmer | The Dark Knight |
| 2008 (35th) | Alexandre Desplat | The Curious Case of Benjamin Button |
| 2008 (35th) | Ramin Djawadi | Iron Man |
| 2008 (35th) | Clint Eastwood | Changeling |
| 2008 (35th) | John Ottman | Valkyrie |
| 2008 (35th) | John Powell | Jumper |
| 2009 (36th) | James Horner | Avatar |
| 2009 (36th) | Brian Eno | The Lovely Bones |
| 2009 (36th) | Michael Giacchino | Up |
| 2009 (36th) | Taro Iwashiro | Red Cliff |
| 2009 (36th) | Christopher Young | Drag Me to Hell |
| 2009 (36th) | Hans Zimmer | Sherlock Holmes |

=== 2010s ===
| Year | Composer(s) | Film |
|---|---|---|
| 2010 (37th) | Hans Zimmer | Inception |
| 2010 (37th) | Clint Eastwood | Hereafter |
| 2010 (37th) | Michael Giacchino | Let Me In |
| 2010 (37th) | Gottfried Huppertz (posthumous) | The Complete Metropolis |
| 2010 (37th) | John Powell | How to Train Your Dragon |
| 2010 (37th) | Daft Punk | Tron: Legacy |
| 2011 (38th) | Michael Giacchino | Super 8 |
| 2011 (38th) | Michael Giacchino | Mission: Impossible – Ghost Protocol |
| 2011 (38th) | Howard Shore | Hugo |
| 2011 (38th) | Alan Silvestri | Captain America: The First Avenger |
| 2011 (38th) | John Williams | The Adventures of Tintin |
| 2011 (38th) | John Williams | War Horse |
| 2012 (39th) | Danny Elfman | Frankenweenie |
| 2012 (39th) | Mychael Danna | Life of Pi |
| 2012 (39th) | Dario Marianelli | Anna Karenina |
| 2012 (39th) | Thomas Newman | Skyfall |
| 2012 (39th) | Howard Shore | The Hobbit: An Unexpected Journey |
| 2012 (39th) | Hans Zimmer | The Dark Knight Rises |
| 2013 (40th) | Frank Ilfman | Big Bad Wolves |
| 2013 (40th) | Danny Elfman | Oz the Great and Powerful |
| 2013 (40th) | Howard Shore | The Hobbit: The Desolation of Smaug |
| 2013 (40th) | Brian Tyler | Iron Man 3 |
| 2013 (40th) | Brian Tyler | Now You See Me |
| 2013 (40th) | John Williams | The Book Thief |
| 2014 (41st) | Hans Zimmer | Interstellar |
| 2014 (41st) | Alexandre Desplat | Godzilla |
| 2014 (41st) | Michael Giacchino | Dawn of the Planet of the Apes |
| 2014 (41st) | Henry Jackman | Captain America: The Winter Soldier |
| 2014 (41st) | John Powell | How to Train Your Dragon 2 |
| 2014 (41st) | Howard Shore | The Hobbit: The Battle of the Five Armies |
| 2015 (42nd) | John Williams | Star Wars: The Force Awakens |
| 2015 (42nd) | Tom Holkenborg | Mad Max: Fury Road |
| 2015 (42nd) | Jóhann Jóhannsson | Sicario |
| 2015 (42nd) | M. M. Keeravani | Baahubali: The Beginning |
| 2015 (42nd) | Ennio Morricone | The Hateful Eight |
| 2015 (42nd) | Fernando Velázquez | Crimson Peak |
| 2016 (43rd) | Justin Hurwitz | La La Land |
| 2016 (43rd) | Michael Giacchino | Doctor Strange |
| 2016 (43rd) | Michael Giacchino | Rogue One: A Star Wars Story |
| 2016 (43rd) | James Newton Howard | Fantastic Beasts and Where to Find Them |
| 2016 (43rd) | Thomas Newman | Passengers |
| 2016 (43rd) | John Williams | The BFG |
| 2017 (44th) | Michael Giacchino | Coco |
| 2017 (44th) | Carter Burwell | Wonderstruck |
| 2017 (44th) | John Debney and Joseph Trapanese | The Greatest Showman |
| 2017 (44th) | Alexandre Desplat | The Shape of Water |
| 2017 (44th) | Ludwig Göransson | Black Panther |
| 2017 (44th) | John Williams | Star Wars: The Last Jedi |
| 2018/2019 (45th) | Marc Shaiman | Mary Poppins Returns |
| 2018/2019 (45th) | Danny Elfman | Dumbo |
| 2018/2019 (45th) | Bear McCreary | Godzilla: King of the Monsters |
| 2018/2019 (45th) | Alan Menken | Aladdin |
| 2018/2019 (45th) | Alan Silvestri | Avengers: Endgame |
| 2018/2019 (45th) | Alan Silvestri | Ready Player One |
| 2019/2020 (46th) | John Williams | Star Wars: The Rise of Skywalker |
| 2019/2020 (46th) | Ludwig Göransson | Tenet |
| 2019/2020 (46th) | Nathan Johnson | Knives Out |
| 2019/2020 (46th) | Jaeil Jung | Parasite |
| 2019/2020 (46th) | Thomas Newman | 1917 |
| 2019/2020 (46th) | Trent Reznor and Atticus Ross | Mank |

=== 2020s ===
| Year | Composer | Film |
|---|---|---|
| 2021/2022 (50th) | Danny Elfman | Doctor Strange in the Multiverse of Madness |
| 2021/2022 (50th) | Michael Abels | Nope |
| 2021/2022 (50th) | Nicholas Britell | Cruella |
| 2021/2022 (50th) | Michael Giacchino | The Batman |
| 2021/2022 (50th) | Nathan Johnson | Nightmare Alley |
| 2021/2022 (50th) | Howard Shore | Crimes of the Future |
| 2021/2022 (50th) | Joel P. West | Shang-Chi and the Legend of the Ten Rings |
| 2022/2023 (51st) | John Williams | Indiana Jones and the Dial of Destiny |
| 2022/2023 (51st) | Simon Franglen | Avatar: The Way of Water |
| 2022/2023 (51st) | Mark Ronson & Andrew Wyatt | Barbie |
| 2022/2023 (51st) | Daniel Pemberton | Spider-Man: Across the Spider-Verse |
| 2022/2023 (51st) | Alan Menken | The Little Mermaid |
| 2022/2023 (51st) | Marco Beltrami | Renfield |
| 2023/2024 (52nd) | Danny Elfman | Beetlejuice Beetlejuice |
| 2023/2024 (52nd) | Hans Zimmer | Dune: Part Two |
| 2023/2024 (52nd) | Dario Marianelli | Ghostbusters: Frozen Empire |
| 2023/2024 (52nd) | James Newton Howard | The Hunger Games: The Ballad of Songbirds & Snakes |
| 2023/2024 (52nd) | John Paesano | Kingdom of the Planet of the Apes |
| 2023/2024 (52nd) | Cristobal Tapia de Veer | Smile 2 |
| 2024/2025 (53rd) | Trent Reznor and Atticus Ross | Tron: Ares |
| 2024/2025 (53rd) | Simon Franglen | Avatar: Fire and Ash |
| 2024/2025 (53rd) | Michael Giacchino | The Fantastic Four: First Steps |
| 2024/2025 (53rd) | Alexandre Desplat | Frankenstein |
| 2024/2025 (53rd) | Ludwig Göransson | Sinners |
| 2024/2025 (53rd) | John Powell and Stephen Schwartz | Wicked: For Good |

== Multiple nominations ==
23 nominations

- John Williams

17 nominations

- Danny Elfman
- Jerry Goldsmith

13 nominations

- Howard Shore
- Alan Silvestri
- Hans Zimmer

10 nominations

- Michael Giacchino

9 nominations

- James Horner

8 nominations

- John Powell

6 nominations

- Thomas Newman
- Christopher Young

5 nominations

- James Newton Howard
- Alan Menken
- John Ottman

4 nominations

- John Carpenter

3 nominations

- David Arnold
- Alexandre Desplat
- Maurice Jarre
- Marc Shaiman
- Ken Thorne

2 nominations

- Angelo Badalamenti
- John Barry
- Bruce Broughton
- Patrick Doyle
- Clint Eastwood
- Ludwig Göransson
- Harry Gregson-Williams
- Reinhold Heil
- Nathan Johnson
- Johnny Klimek
- Michael Nyman
- Trevor Rabin
- Trent Reznor
- J. Peter Robinson
- Atticus Ross
- Brian Tyler

== Multiple wins ==
10 wins

- John Williams

8 wins

- Danny Elfman

3 wins

- James Horner
- Alan Silvestri
- Hans Zimmer

2 wins

- Michael Giacchino
- Alan Menken
- John Ottman
- Miklós Rózsa
- Howard Shore

== See also ==
- Academy Award for Best Original Score
