= Fright (film) =

1971 British film by Peter Collinson

- UK theatrical poster
- Directed by: Peter Collinson
- Written by: Tudor Gates
- Produced by: Harry Fine; Michael Style
- Starring: Susan George; Honor Blackman; Ian Bannen; John Gregson; Dennis Waterman
- Cinematography: Ian Wilson
- Edited by: Raymond Poulton
- Music by: Harry Robinson
- Production company: Fantale Films
- Distributed by: British Lion Films
- Release date: 15 October 1971
- Running time: 87 minutes
- Country: United Kingdom
- Language: English
- Budget: £127,555

Fright is a 1971 British thriller film starring Susan George, Ian Bannen, Honor Blackman, and John Gregson. The film follows a babysitter who is terrorized one evening by her employer's deranged ex-husband. Its original working titles were The Baby Minder and Girl in the Dark before it was titled Fright. It is said by many horror fans and commentators to be one of or even the first film in which an isolated babysitter is stalked by an unrelenting and psychopathic antagonist, rendering it the forerunner of dozens of movies to use similar premises over the following decades.

== Plot ==
College student Amanda is babysitting for Helen and Jim, watching after their young son at their large estate in the woods. Amanda finds it odd there are so many locks on the front door but meets the child, Tara, before they go to sleep. Helen and Jim leave, Amanda makes tea in the kitchen, and is watched by a man through the window. After hearing odd noises, she is startled by the doorbell ringing, and finds her boyfriend Chris at the door. Chris tells Amanda that Helen and Jim aren't married and that her actual husband was put in a psychiatric institution after trying to kill her. The two lounge on the couch before she makes him leave after Helen calls the home to check in. As Chris walks outside, he is attacked by a man hiding outside who repeatedly punches him in the face.

Amanda continues to hear knocking noises and believes it is Chris playing a prank on her. She opens a window to reveal a silhouetted face staring back at her. Panicked, Amanda calls the restaurant where Helen is dining with Jim and their friend, Dr. Cordell. Helen is notified by the restaurant staff and goes to take the call, but the line goes dead after she picks up. Worried that her ex-husband, Brian, may have arrived at the home, Dr. Cordell calls the institution, who notify him that Brian escaped earlier in the night.

At the front door, Amanda finds Chris, covered in blood; with him is Brian, who claims to be a neighbor who heard a commotion outside. Chris loses consciousness on the floor, and Brian consoles Amanda, who is distraught. At the house, Amanda grows disconcerted when Brian refuses to allow her upstairs, and begins calling her Helen. Realizing that he is Helen's ex-husband, Amanda begins to play into Brian's delusions, and repeatedly proclaims her love for him.

Brian eventually falls asleep, and Amanda attempts to leave the house with Tara, but is stopped by him in the foyer. Chris regains consciousness and attempts to fight Brian, but Brian murders him. Amanda flees out the front door just as police arrive at the home, but she is pulled back inside by Brian, who threatens her and Tara with a shard of glass. Helen and Jim arrive at the home, where Dr. Cordell and numerous policemen have gathered. A standoff ensues in which they attempt to coax him out of the house. Brian demands Helen come inside, but she agrees only on the condition that Amanda and Tara are let outside.

Helen enters the home, where Brian locks her inside, and begins choking her after he finds she has brought in a canister of tear gas. Amanda stops him by slashing his face open with the glass shard, and flees outside. Brian charges after her, carrying Tara with a piece of glass against his neck. The police hold fire and Helen follows outside and attempts to negotiate with him. Brian hands Tara to her and she slowly backs away from him. As she does so, Amanda avenges Chris by shooting Brian in the head, killing him.

== Cast ==
- Susan George as Amanda
- Honor Blackman as Helen Lloyd
- Ian Bannen as Brian Lloyd
- John Gregson as Dr. Cordell
- George Cole as Jim
- Dennis Waterman as Chris
- Maurice Kaufmann as Inspector
- Michael Brennan as Sergeant
- Roger Lloyd-Pack as Constable
- Tara Collinson as Tara

== Production ==
=== Background ===
Fantale Filmes was a company composed of producers Harry Fine and Michael Styles and writer Tudor Gates. It had made three horror movies for Hammer starting with The Vampire Lovers. This film was a commission for Fantale from British Lion. The original title was The Babysitter but that was changed because there was an American film with the same title. Then it was called The Girl in the Dark. It was the first film that Honor Blackman had appeared in with her husband Maurice Kaufmann.

=== Casting ===
Susan George had worked with director Peter Collinson before in Up the Junction (1968). Collinson offered George the role with no audition. George said Colinson "made the film something special. It was very much his baby." She would work with Collinson a third and final time in Tomorrow Never Comes (1978).

George Cole and Dennis Waterman, who co-starred in Minder together, both appear in the film although they share no scenes.

=== Filming ===
The film was shot at Shepperton Studios in early 1971. Filming was threatened in January by a work stoppage but it was decided not to go ahead.

== Release ==
Fright opened theatrically in London 15 October 1971. In the United States, it was distributed by Allied Artists, opening on 30 May 1972.

=== Home media ===
Anchor Bay Entertainment first released Fright on DVD in 2002. On 17 September 2019, Scream Factory released a Blu-ray edition, sourced from a 4K remaster by rights holder StudioCanal. Subsequently, Kino Lorber released an Ultra HD Blu-ray edition on 5 November 2024.

== Reception ==
=== Critical response ===
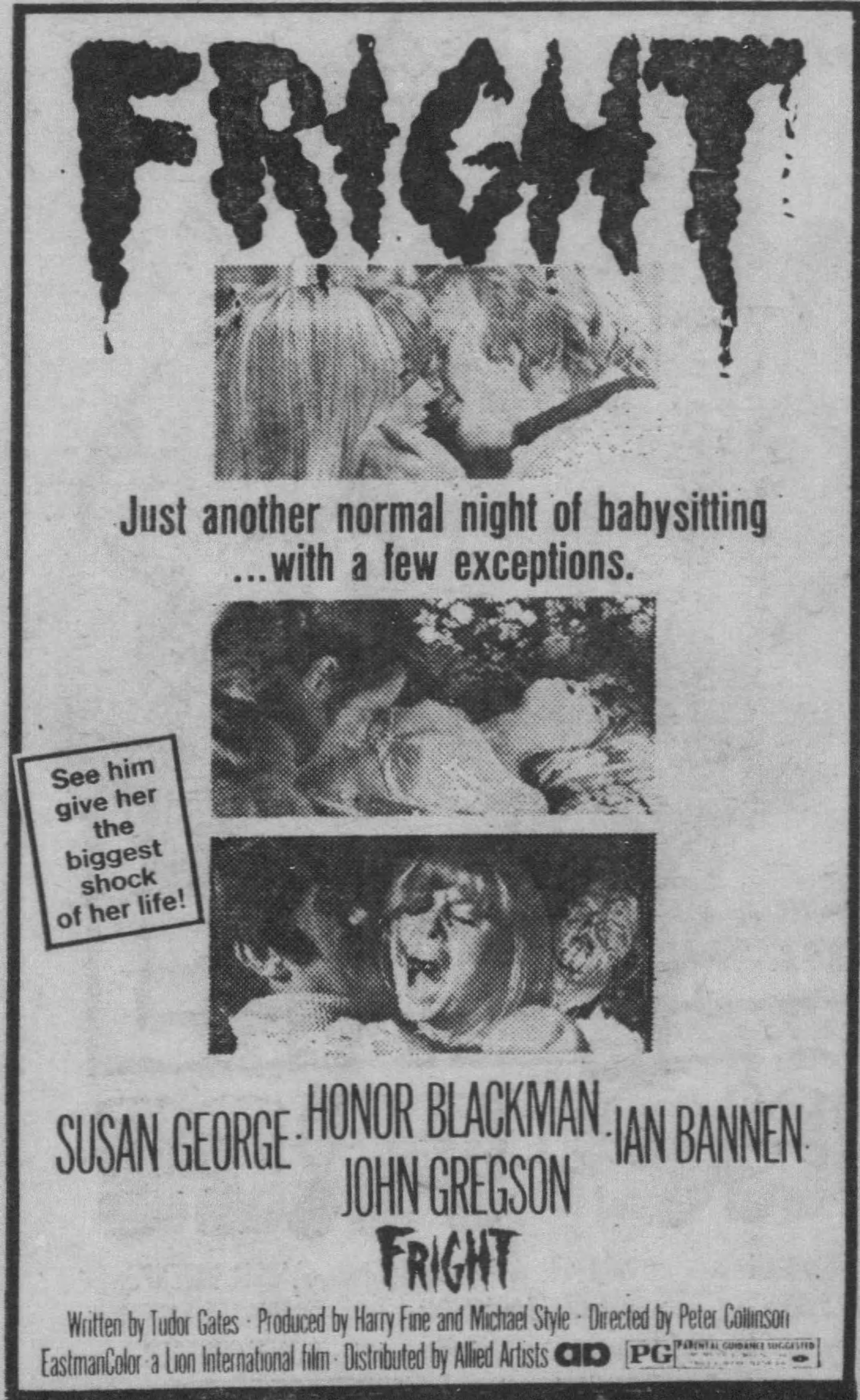
U.S. theatre advertisement, 1972

Tudor Gates called it "a good straightforward thriller... It was pretty good. Peter directed it well. Some flair. Perhaps a little more flair than I would have liked in some places." He disliked the performance of Roger Lloyd-Pack.

Variety's review of the film noted: "Good production values, some excellent shocks and well developed tension cannot lift" the film "above program status"... "Tudor Gates’ script has bad moments and makes the police act as if in slapstick comedy and not a serious thriller. Attractive Susan George carries most of the picture and it is to her credit that she makes the character credible. Ian Bannen registers as the homicidal psychotic. Honor Blackman is ill at ease as the worrying mother. Ian Wilson’s camerawork effectively contrasts the warm, cheery atmosphere of the restaurant where the mother dines, with the cold, foreboding house where terror reigns."

Vincent Canby of The New York Times called it "describably dreadful... Collinson, who has made some bad movies in his short career (The Penthouse and The Italian Job, among others), bottoms himself with the dreary affectations in Fright". The Evening Standard's Alexander Walker was similarly critical, deeming it a "coarse, degraded thriller."

A review published in The Village Voice noted: "Fright has little else on its mind other than what the title implies, but the first half hour of the film is so full of red herrings and squeaky doors that all the potential for situational horror is soon dissipated." Leonard Maltin deemed the film a "contrived, [with] mechanical direction and so-so script." Roger Ebert praised George and Bannen's performances, but deemed the film "a passably good thriller" in comparison to director Collinson's previous film, The Penthouse (1967).

Robert Sellers of the Radio Times called the film "formulaic" in direction and added: "George merely alternates between pouting and screaming," assessing her performance as a "dress rehearsal for her ordeal in Straw Dogs." Vincent Canby of The New York Times criticized the film's cinematography and "arbitrary cruelties," deeming it a "a describably dreadful English suspense melodrama."

Film historian James Arena credited the film as a "groundbreaker" of the "terrorized babysitter formula," comparing it to Halloween, which was released seven years later. Other critics, such as Gary Smith, cite the film as a proto-slasher film.

== See also ==
- Suspense (1913 film)

== Sources ==
- Arena, James (2011). Fright Night on Channel 9: Saturday Night Horror Films on New York's WOR-TV, 1973–1987. Jefferson, North Carolina: McFarland. ISBN 978-0-786-48891-9.
- Chapman, James (2022). The Money Behind the Screen: A History of British Film Finance, 1945-1985. Edinburgh, Scotland: Edinburgh University Press. ISBN 978-1-399-50077-7.
- Cole, George (2013). The World Was My Lobster: My Autobiography. John Blake Publishing. ISBN 978-1-78219-469-9.
- Maltin, Leonard (1994). Leonard Maltin's Movie and Video Guide. New York City, New York: Plume. p. 460. ISBN 978-0-452-27327-6.
- Smith, Gary A. (2006). Uneasy Dreams: The Golden Age of British Horror Films, 1956-1976. Jefferson, North Carolina: McFarland. p. 122. ISBN 978-0-786-42661-4.
