= The Time Guardian =

- Theatrical film poster
- Directed by: Brian Hannant
- Written by: John Baxter; Brian Hannant
- Produced by: Norman Wilkinson; Robert Lagettie
- Starring: Tom Burlinson; Nikki Coghill; Dean Stockwell; Carrie Fisher
- Cinematography: Geoff Burton
- Edited by: Andrew Prowse
- Music by: Allan Zavod
- Production companies: Hemdale Film Corporation; FGH; International Film Management; Chateau Production Investments
- Distributed by: Filmpac Holdings
- Release date: 3 December 1987
- Running time: 88 minutes
- Country: Australia
- Language: English
- Budget: A$8 million
- Box office: A$97,728 (Australia) $548,000 (International) $1.2 million (Inflation)

The Time Guardian is a 1987 Australian science fiction film directed by Brian Hannant, co-written by John Baxter and Hannant, and starring Tom Burlinson, Nikki Coghill, Dean Stockwell, and Carrie Fisher.

The Time Guardian was released in Australia on 3 December 1987. The film vastly underperformed at the box office and was poorly received by critics.

== Plot ==
In 4039, a city of survivors from the Neutron Wars travels through time and space escaping the Jen-Diki, a race of cyborgs intent on wiping out humanity. Two soldiers from the city, crusty Ballard and historian Petra, are transported to the South Australian outback in 1988 to prepare a landing site for the city. Petra is wounded and Ballard seeks help from geologist Annie Lassite.

Ballard is dismayed when Annie's ancient cave paintings depict his city. After a police officer, MacCarthy, activated Ballard's tracking device despite his protests, an advance party of Jen-Diki arrive in Australia.

== Cast ==
- Tom Burlinson as Ballard, a grizzled 41st-century soldier;
- Nikki Coghill as Annie, a 20th-century geologist;
- Carrie Fisher as Petra, a 41st-century historian with a specialisation in the 20th century's technology and customs;
- Dean Stockwell as Boss, a 41st-century city official;
- Tim Robertson as Sergeant McCarthy, a pragmatic 20th-century Australian police officer;
- Jim Holt as Rafferty, an alarmist 20th-century Australian police officer.
- Bruno Lucia as Commando

== Production ==
Brian Hannant had been drawn to the rock formation at Wilpena Pound in South Australia while making Mad Max 2. This inspired him to write a script with John Baxter in the early 1980s. According to Baxter the script was originally called Time Rider, about a geologist who, while investigating magnetic anomalies around Wilpena Pound in South Australia, encounters a man from the future, who is a scout sent back in time to find a home for his people, pursued by the Jen-Diki tribe. Baxter:

[The] early scripts contrasted present and future lifestyles, and involved, in addition to the love story, and elegiac relationship between the girl and Prenzler, an old man in the nearby town who held the key to certain incidents in her future. There were elements of satire: conceived as descendants of contemporary polluters, our Jen-Diki were variously the remnants of a mining conglomerate or of a labour union. The modest action climax used a minimum of special effects.

Hannant and Baxter received two Australian Film Commission grants and had their script optioned to two local production companies. They eventually sold it to Chateau Productions, and succeeded in raising finance from New World Pictures and with the help of Antony I. Ginnane at Hemdale Film Corporation. According to Hannant the $8 million budget was raised in two days but of that $1 million went to brokers. The film obtained pre-sales worth $4.8 million to Hemdale.

Producer Tom Wilkinson said "Here at last was a special effects story that had originality, pace and a big idea. The waiting has been worthwhile. We wanted to make sure we had the right combination of leading actors and the right technical skills because those will be the real making—or unmaking—of the movie."

Eight weeks before shooting, Hannant says Hemdale presented him with a re-write of the script by an American writer. Hannant tried to incorporate changes but says he did not have enough money. John Baxter quit the project and the shoot was cut from 13 weeks to nine. Hannant left the film during post-production ("one step ahead of being fired," according to Baxter) and some extra scenes were shot by the editor.

Tom Burlinson was cast in the lead. "If we're successful," said Burlinson, "if it comes off, we'll show the world we can make this sort of film... I play a tough old so-and-so which is different for me... Ballard is almost an anti-hero and not like any of those young men I used to play. He doesn't take any nonsense and he's a bit of a head-thumper."

Filming took place in South Australia at the soundstages of the South Australian Film Corporation at Hendon and at a deserted quarry outside Adelaide. Mirage Effects did the special effects.

Baxter says the final film bore little relation to the original script:

There was a minimal love story, no contrast in life styles. Prenzler had disappeared. The main role, in which we envisioned a mature international actor with a reputation in science fiction and action films (the prospectus specified "Scott Glenn or equivalent") was then by local boyish lad Tom Burlinson. At the behest of Hemdale, the film began and ended in a fire-fight (explaining to my satisfaction the awkward opening of The Terminator).

== Release ==
The film was released in Australia on 3 December 1987 and in the United States on 4 August 1989. In the Philippines, the film was released by Eastern Films as Spacetrap on 17 February 1990, with six Nintendo Family Computer consoles raffled during the first three days of release.

=== Reception ===
The film was poorly received, commercially and critically. It failed to recoup its marketing costs in its cinema release and Hemdale did not have the money to meet its pre-sale obligations. Hemdale then agreed to pay a reduced amount of $2 million but there were difficulties in obtaining this as well.

David Stratton later wrote that:

The story of The Time Guardian is an object lesson in how the deal-driven 10BA Films could be white-anted by the non-creative people. Hannant and Baxter might have made a memorable sci-fi drama to stand alongside classics of the genre but they had the wrong producers, the wrong deals, the wrong budget, the wrong cast and, in the end, the wrong script.

Filmink wrote, "It's hard for filmmakers who want to make sci fi in Australia. The Time Guardian made it that much harder... There's Dean Stockwell as an officer, Carrie Fisher running around as a warrior, Tom Burlinson as a grizzled warrior in a performance that killed his career as a leading man, Nikki Coghill being genuinely charming amidst the carnage. A film that should have a bigger cult."

== Sources ==
- Stratton, David (1990) The Avocado Plantation: Boom and Bust in the Australian Film Industry, Pan MacMillan: Sydney. ISBN 0732902509.
