= Saturn Award for Best Actress =

Annual US film award

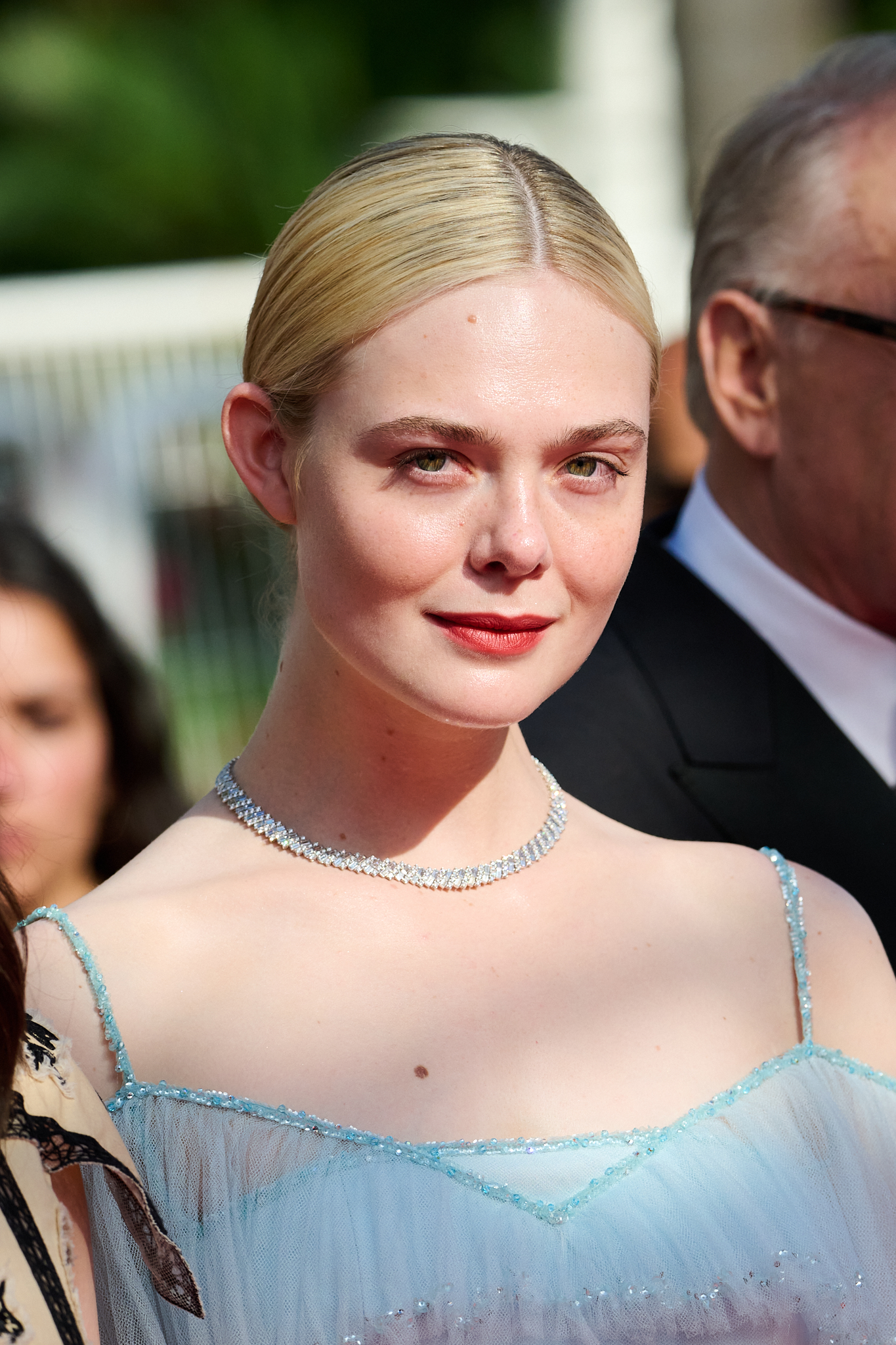
- The 2025 recipient: Elle Fanning
- Awarded for: Best performance of the year by a female in a leading role in a genre film
- Country: United States
- Presented by: Academy of Science Fiction, Fantasy and Horror Films
- First award: 1974/75
- Currently held by: Elle Fanning for Predator: Badlands (2024/2025)
- Website: www.saturnawards.org

The Saturn Award for Best Actress is one of the annual Saturn Awards given by the American professional organization, the Academy of Science Fiction, Fantasy and Horror Films. The Saturn Awards are the oldest film-specialized reward of achievements in science fiction, fantasy, and horror (another award, the Hugo Award is older but includes other genres and media). The Saturn Award included the Best Actress category for the first time in the 1974 film year.

The Saturn Award for Best Actress is the oldest prize to reward actresses in science fiction, fantasy, and horror films: other awards such as the Academy and Golden Globe Awards, despite supposedly disregarding the genre, gave little recognition to acting quality at the time. In 1996 the Saturns began to reward both film and television acting, and created the Saturn Award for Best Actress on Television. For the first two years it was awarded there were no nominees announced.

The actresses with the most nominations are Jamie Lee Curtis, Jodie Foster, Natalie Portman, Naomi Watts and Sigourney Weaver, who are all tied with five. Curtis, Foster, Portman, Watts, Sandra Bullock and Demi Moore are the only actresses to have won it twice. Portman and Michelle Yeoh are the only actresses to win both the Saturn Award and the Academy Award for Best Actress for the same film, while Weaver holds the record for most nominations for playing the same character (Ellen Ripley) with four. Foster is the youngest winner in this category, winning her first award in 1977 at age 13.

== Winners and nominees ==
Legend:

indicates the winner

=== 1970s ===
Year	Actress	Film	Character
1974/1975 (3rd)	Katharine Ross	The Stepford Wives	Joanna Eberhart
1976 (4th)	Blythe Danner	Futureworld	Tracy Ballad
1977 (5th)	Jodie Foster	The Little Girl Who Lives Down the Lane	Rynn Jacobs
1977 (5th)	Julie Christie	Demon Seed	Susan Harris
1977 (5th)	Joan Collins	Empire of the Ants	Marilyn Fryser
1977 (5th)	Melinda Dillon	Close Encounters of the Third Kind	Jillian Guiler
1977 (5th)	Carrie Fisher	Star Wars	Princess Leia Organa
1978 (6th)	Margot Kidder	Superman	Lois Lane
1978 (6th)	Brooke Adams	Invasion of the Body Snatchers	Elizabeth Driscoll
1978 (6th)	Ann-Margret	Magic	Peggy Ann Snow
1978 (6th)	Geneviève Bujold	Coma	Dr. Susan Wheeler
1978 (6th)	Diana Ross	The Wiz	Dorothy Gale
1979 (7th)	Mary Steenburgen	Time After Time	Amy Robbins
1979 (7th)	Susan Saint James	Love at First Bite	Cindy Sondheim
1979 (7th)	Persis Khambatta	Star Trek: The Motion Picture	Lt. Ilia
1979 (7th)	Margot Kidder	The Amityville Horror	Kathy Lutz
1979 (7th)	Sigourney Weaver	Alien	Ripley

=== 1980s ===
Year	Actress	Film	Character
1980 (8th)	Angie Dickinson	Dressed to Kill	Kate Miller
1980 (8th)	Ellen Burstyn	Resurrection	Edna
1980 (8th)	Jamie Lee Curtis	Terror Train	Alana Maxwell
1980 (8th)	Louanne	Oh, God! Book II	Tracy Richards
1980 (8th)	Jane Seymour	Somewhere in Time	Elise McKenna
1981 (9th)	Karen Allen	Raiders of the Lost Ark	Marion Ravenwood
1981 (9th)	Jenny Agutter	An American Werewolf in London	Nurse Alex Price
1981 (9th)	Margot Kidder	Superman II	Lois Lane
1981 (9th)	Angela Lansbury	The Mirror Crack'd	Miss Jane Marple
1981 (9th)	Lily Tomlin	The Incredible Shrinking Woman	Pat Kramer / Judith Beasley
1982 (10th)	Sandahl Bergman	Conan the Barbarian	Valeria
1982 (10th)	Susan George	The House Where Evil Dwells	Laura Fletcher
1982 (10th)	Nastassja Kinski	Cat People	Irena Gallier
1982 (10th)	JoBeth Williams	Poltergeist	Diane Freeling
1982 (10th)	Mary Woronov	Eating Raoul	Mary Bland
1983 (11th)	Louise Fletcher	Brainstorm	Dr. Lillian Reynolds
1983 (11th)	Bess Armstrong	High Road to China	Eve "Evie" Tozer
1983 (11th)	Bobbie Bresee	Mausoleum	Susan Walker Farrell
1983 (11th)	Carrie Fisher	Return of the Jedi	Princess Leia Organa
1983 (11th)	Ally Sheedy	WarGames	Jennifer Mack
1984 (12th)	Daryl Hannah	Splash	Madison
1984 (12th)	Karen Allen	Starman	Jenny Hayden
1984 (12th)	Nancy Allen	The Philadelphia Experiment	Allison Hayes
1984 (12th)	Linda Hamilton	The Terminator	Sarah Connor
1984 (12th)	Helen Slater	Supergirl	Supergirl / Kara Zor-El / Linda Lee
1985 (13th)	Coral Browne	Dreamchild	Alice Hargreaves
1985 (13th)	Glenn Close	Maxie	Jan / Maxie
1985 (13th)	Mia Farrow	The Purple Rose of Cairo	Cecilia
1985 (13th)	Michelle Pfeiffer	Ladyhawke	Isabeau d'Anjou
1985 (13th)	Jessica Tandy	Cocoon	Alma Finley
1986 (14th)	Sigourney Weaver	Aliens	Ellen Ripley
1986 (14th)	Barbara Crampton	From Beyond	Dr. Katherine McMichaels
1986 (14th)	Geena Davis	The Fly	Veronica Quaife
1986 (14th)	Elisabeth Shue	Link	Jane Chase
1986 (14th)	Kathleen Turner	Peggy Sue Got Married	Peggy Sue Bodell
1987 (15th)	Jessica Tandy	*batteries not included	Faye Riley
1987 (15th)	Nancy Allen	RoboCop	Officer Anne Lewis
1987 (15th)	Melinda Dillon	Harry and the Hendersons	Nancy Henderson
1987 (15th)	Lorraine Gary	Jaws: The Revenge	Ellen Brody
1987 (15th)	Susan Sarandon	The Witches of Eastwick	Jane Spofford
1987 (15th)	Robin Wright	The Princess Bride	Buttercup
1988 (16th)	Catherine Hicks	Child's Play	Karen Barclay
1988 (16th)	Kim Basinger	My Stepmother Is an Alien	Celeste Martin
1988 (16th)	Amanda Donohoe	The Lair of the White Worm	Lady Sylvia Marsh
1988 (16th)	Joanna Pacuła	The Kiss	Felice Dunbar
1988 (16th)	Cassandra Peterson	Elvira: Mistress of the Dark	Elvira / Aunt Morgana Talbot
1988 (16th)	Jessica Tandy	Cocoon: The Return	Alma Finley
1989/1990 (17th)	Demi Moore	Ghost	Molly Jensen
1989/1990 (17th)	Julie Carmen	Fright Night Part 2	Regine Dandrige
1989/1990 (17th)	Blanca Guerra	Santa Sangre	Concha
1989/1990 (17th)	Anjelica Huston	The Witches	Miss Eva Ernst / Grand High Witch
1989/1990 (17th)	Nicole Kidman	Dead Calm	Rae Ingram
1989/1990 (17th)	Madonna	Dick Tracy	Breathless Mahoney
1989/1990 (17th)	Mary Elizabeth Mastrantonio	The Abyss	Dr. Lindsey Brigman
1989/1990 (17th)	Ally Sheedy	Fear	Cayce Bridges
1989/1990 (17th)	Jenny Wright	I, Madman	Virginia

=== 1990s ===
Year	Actress	Film	Character
1991 (18th)	Linda Hamilton	Terminator 2: Judgment Day	Sarah Connor
1991 (18th)	Kathy Bates	Misery	Annie Wilkes
1991 (18th)	Jodie Foster	The Silence of the Lambs	Clarice Starling
1991 (18th)	Julia Roberts	Sleeping with the Enemy	Laura Burney
1991 (18th)	Winona Ryder	Edward Scissorhands	Kim Boggs
1991 (18th)	Meryl Streep	Defending Your Life	Julia
1992 (19th)	Virginia Madsen	Candyman	Helen Lyle
1992 (19th)	Rebecca De Mornay	The Hand That Rocks the Cradle	Peyton Flanders / Mrs. Mott
1992 (19th)	Sheryl Lee	Twin Peaks: Fire Walk with Me	Laura Palmer
1992 (19th)	Winona Ryder	Bram Stoker's Dracula	Mina Harker / Elisabeta
1992 (19th)	Sharon Stone	Basic Instinct	Catherine Tramell
1992 (19th)	Meryl Streep	Death Becomes Her	Madeline Ashton
1992 (19th)	Sigourney Weaver	Alien 3	Ellen Ripley
1993 (20th)	Andie MacDowell	Groundhog Day	Rita
1993 (20th)	Patricia Arquette	True Romance	Alabama Whitman
1993 (20th)	Laura Dern	Jurassic Park	Dr. Ellie Sattler
1993 (20th)	Michelle Forbes	Kalifornia	Carrie Laughlin
1993 (20th)	Anjelica Huston	Addams Family Values	Morticia Addams
1993 (20th)	Bette Midler	Hocus Pocus	Winifred "Winnie" Sanderson
1993 (20th)	Ally Sheedy	Man's Best Friend	Lori Tanner
1994 (21st)	Sandra Bullock	Speed	Annie Porter
1994 (21st)	Jamie Lee Curtis	True Lies	Helen Tasker
1994 (21st)	Mädchen Amick	Dream Lover	Lena Mathers
1994 (21st)	Helena Bonham Carter	Mary Shelley’s Frankenstein	Elizabeth Frankenstein
1994 (21st)	Penelope Ann Miller	The Shadow	Margo Lane
1994 (21st)	Michelle Pfeiffer	Wolf	Laura Alden
1995 (22nd)	Angela Bassett	Strange Days	Lornette "Mace" Mason
1995 (22nd)	Kathy Bates	Dolores Claiborne	Dolores Claiborne
1995 (22nd)	Nicole Kidman	To Die For	Suzanne Stone-Maretto
1995 (22nd)	Sharon Stone	The Quick and the Dead	The Lady
1995 (22nd)	Madeleine Stowe	12 Monkeys	Kathryn Railly
1995 (22nd)	Marina Zudina	Mute Witness	Billy
1996 (23rd)	Neve Campbell	Scream	Sidney Prescott
1996 (23rd)	Geena Davis	The Long Kiss Goodnight	Samantha Caine / Charlene Elizabeth "Charly" Baltimore
1996 (23rd)	Gina Gershon	Bound	Corky
1996 (23rd)	Helen Hunt	Twister	Dr. Jo Harding
1996 (23rd)	Frances McDormand	Fargo	Marge Gunderson
1996 (23rd)	Penelope Ann Miller	The Relic	Dr. Margo Green
1997 (24th)	Jodie Foster	Contact	Dr. Eleanor "Ellie" Ann Arroway
1997 (24th)	Neve Campbell	Scream 2	Sidney Prescott
1997 (24th)	Pam Grier	Jackie Brown	Jackie Brown
1997 (24th)	Jennifer Lopez	Anaconda	Terri Flores
1997 (24th)	Mira Sorvino	Mimic	Dr. Susan Tyler
1997 (24th)	Sigourney Weaver	Alien: Resurrection	Ellen Ripley
1998 (25th)	Drew Barrymore	Ever After	Danielle de Barbarac / Countess Nicole de Lancret
1998 (25th)	Gillian Anderson	The X-Files	Dana Scully
1998 (25th)	Jamie Lee Curtis	Halloween H20: 20 Years Later	Laurie Strode / Keri Tate
1998 (25th)	Meg Ryan	City of Angels	Maggie Rice
1998 (25th)	Jennifer Tilly	Bride of Chucky	Tiffany
1998 (25th)	Catherine Zeta-Jones	The Mask of Zorro	Elena De La Vega
1999 (26th)	Christina Ricci	Sleepy Hollow	Katrina Van Tassel
1999 (26th)	Heather Graham	Austin Powers: The Spy Who Shagged Me	Felicity Shagwell
1999 (26th)	Catherine Keener	Being John Malkovich	Maxine Lund
1999 (26th)	Carrie-Anne Moss	The Matrix	Trinity
1999 (26th)	Sigourney Weaver	Galaxy Quest	Gwen DeMarco / Lt. Tawny Madison
1999 (26th)	Rachel Weisz	The Mummy	Evelyn "Evie" Carnahan O'Connell

=== 2000s ===
Year	Actress	Film	Character
2000 (27th)	Téa Leoni	The Family Man	Kate Reynolds / Kate Campbell
2000 (27th)	Cate Blanchett	The Gift	Annabelle "Annie" Wilson
2000 (27th)	Ellen Burstyn	Requiem for a Dream	Sara Goldfarb
2000 (27th)	Jennifer Lopez	The Cell	Dr. Catherine Deane
2000 (27th)	Michelle Pfeiffer	What Lies Beneath	Claire Spencer
2000 (27th)	Michelle Yeoh	Crouching Tiger, Hidden Dragon	Yu Shu Lien
2001 (28th)	Nicole Kidman	The Others	Grace Stewart
2001 (28th)	Kate Beckinsale	Serendipity	Sara Thomas
2001 (28th)	Angelina Jolie	Lara Croft: Tomb Raider	Lara Croft
2001 (28th)	Julianne Moore	Hannibal	Clarice Starling
2001 (28th)	Frances O'Connor	A.I. Artificial Intelligence	Monica Swinton
2001 (28th)	Naomi Watts	Mulholland Drive	Betty Elms
2002 (29th)	Naomi Watts	The Ring	Rachel Keller
2002 (29th)	Kirsten Dunst	Spider-Man	Mary Jane Watson
2002 (29th)	Jodie Foster	Panic Room	Meg Altman
2002 (29th)	Milla Jovovich	Resident Evil	Alice
2002 (29th)	Natascha McElhone	Solaris	Rheya
2002 (29th)	Natalie Portman	Star Wars: Episode II – Attack of the Clones	Senator Padmé Amidala
2003 (30th)	Uma Thurman	Kill Bill: Volume 1	The Bride
2003 (30th)	Kate Beckinsale	Underworld	Selene
2003 (30th)	Jessica Biel	The Texas Chainsaw Massacre	Erin Hardesty
2003 (30th)	Cate Blanchett	The Missing	Magdalena "Maggie" Gilkeson
2003 (30th)	Jennifer Connelly	Hulk	Betty Ross
2003 (30th)	Jamie Lee Curtis	Freaky Friday	Tess Coleman / Anna Coleman
2004 (31st)	Blanchard Ryan	Open Water	Susan Watkins
2004 (31st)	Nicole Kidman	Birth	Anna
2004 (31st)	Julianne Moore	The Forgotten	Telly Paretta
2004 (31st)	Uma Thurman	Kill Bill: Volume 2	The Bride / Beatrix Kiddo
2004 (31st)	Kate Winslet	Eternal Sunshine of the Spotless Mind	Clementine Kruczynski
2004 (31st)	Zhang Ziyi	House of Flying Daggers	Mei
2005 (32nd)	Naomi Watts	King Kong	Ann Darrow
2005 (32nd)	Jodie Foster	Flightplan	Kyle Pratt
2005 (32nd)	Laura Linney	The Exorcism of Emily Rose	Erin Christine Bruner
2005 (32nd)	Rachel McAdams	Red Eye	Lisa Reisert
2005 (32nd)	Natalie Portman	Star Wars: Episode III – Revenge of the Sith	Padmé Amidala
2005 (32nd)	Tilda Swinton	The Chronicles of Narnia: The Lion, the Witch and the Wardrobe	Jadis, the White Witch
2006 (33rd)	Natalie Portman	V for Vendetta	Evey Hammond
2006 (33rd)	Kate Bosworth	Superman Returns	Lois Lane
2006 (33rd)	Judi Dench	Notes on a Scandal	Barbara Covett
2006 (33rd)	Maggie Gyllenhaal	Stranger than Fiction	Ana Pascal
2006 (33rd)	Shauna Macdonald	The Descent	Sarah Carter
2006 (33rd)	Renée Zellweger	Miss Potter	Beatrix Potter
2007 (34th)	Amy Adams	Enchanted	Princess Giselle
2007 (34th)	Helena Bonham Carter	Sweeney Todd: The Demon Barber of Fleet Street	Mrs. Lovett
2007 (34th)	Ashley Judd	Bug	Agnes White
2007 (34th)	Belén Rueda	The Orphanage	Laura
2007 (34th)	Carice van Houten	Black Book	Rachel Stein / Ellis de Vries
2007 (34th)	Naomi Watts	Eastern Promises	Anna Khitrova
2008 (35th)	Angelina Jolie	Changeling	Christine Collins
2008 (35th)	Cate Blanchett	The Curious Case of Benjamin Button	Daisy Fuller
2008 (35th)	Maggie Gyllenhaal	The Dark Knight	Rachel Dawes
2008 (35th)	Julianne Moore	Blindness	Doctor's Wife
2008 (35th)	Emily Mortimer	Transsiberian	Jessie
2008 (35th)	Gwyneth Paltrow	Iron Man	Virginia "Pepper" Potts
2009 (36th)	Zoe Saldaña	Avatar	Neytiri
2009 (36th)	Catherine Keener	Where the Wild Things Are	Connie
2009 (36th)	Mélanie Laurent	Inglourious Basterds	Shoshanna Dreyfus / Emmanuelle Mimieux
2009 (36th)	Alison Lohman	Drag Me to Hell	Christine Brown
2009 (36th)	Natalie Portman	Brothers	Grace Cahill
2009 (36th)	Charlize Theron	The Burning Plain	Sylvia

=== 2010s ===
Year	Actress	Film	Character
2010 (37th)	Natalie Portman	Black Swan	Nina Sayers / The Swan Queen
2010 (37th)	Cécile de France	Hereafter	Marie Lelay
2010 (37th)	Angelina Jolie	Salt	Evelyn Salt / Natasha Chenkova
2010 (37th)	Carey Mulligan	Never Let Me Go	Kathy H.
2010 (37th)	Elliot Page	Inception	Ariadne
2010 (37th)	Noomi Rapace	The Girl with the Dragon Tattoo	Lisbeth Salander
2011 (38th)	Kirsten Dunst	Melancholia	Justine
2011 (38th)	Jessica Chastain	Take Shelter	Samantha LaForche
2011 (38th)	Keira Knightley	A Dangerous Method	Sabina Spielrein
2011 (38th)	Rooney Mara	The Girl with the Dragon Tattoo	Lisbeth Salander
2011 (38th)	Brit Marling	Another Earth	Rhoda Williams
2011 (38th)	Elizabeth Olsen	Martha Marcy May Marlene	Martha
2012 (39th)	Jennifer Lawrence	The Hunger Games	Katniss Everdeen
2012 (39th)	Jessica Chastain	Zero Dark Thirty	Maya
2012 (39th)	Ann Dowd	Compliance	Sandra
2012 (39th)	Zoe Kazan	Ruby Sparks	Ruby Sparks
2012 (39th)	Helen Mirren	Hitchcock	Alma Reville
2012 (39th)	Naomi Watts	The Impossible	Maria Bennett
2013 (40th)	Sandra Bullock	Gravity	Dr. Ryan Stone
2013 (40th)	Halle Berry	The Call	Jordan Turner
2013 (40th)	Martina Gedeck	The Wall	Die Frau (The Woman)
2013 (40th)	Jennifer Lawrence	The Hunger Games: Catching Fire	Katniss Everdeen
2013 (40th)	Emma Thompson	Saving Mr. Banks	P. L. Travers
2013 (40th)	Mia Wasikowska	Stoker	India Stoker
2014 (41st)	Rosamund Pike	Gone Girl	Amy Elliott-Dunne
2014 (41st)	Emily Blunt	Edge of Tomorrow	Sergeant Rita Rose Vrataski
2014 (41st)	Essie Davis	The Babadook	Amelia
2014 (41st)	Anne Hathaway	Interstellar	Amelia Brand
2014 (41st)	Angelina Jolie	Maleficent	Maleficent
2014 (41st)	Jennifer Lawrence	The Hunger Games: Mockingjay – Part 1	Katniss Everdeen
2015 (42nd)	Charlize Theron	Mad Max: Fury Road	Imperator Furiosa
2015 (42nd)	Emily Blunt	Sicario	Kate Macer
2015 (42nd)	Jessica Chastain	The Martian	Melissa Lewis
2015 (42nd)	Blake Lively	The Age of Adaline	Adaline
2015 (42nd)	Daisy Ridley	Star Wars: The Force Awakens	Rey
2015 (42nd)	Mia Wasikowska	Crimson Peak	Edith Cushing
2016 (43rd)	Mary Elizabeth Winstead	10 Cloverfield Lane	Michelle
2016 (43rd)	Amy Adams	Arrival	Dr. Louise Banks
2016 (43rd)	Emily Blunt	The Girl on the Train	Rachel Watson
2016 (43rd)	Taraji P. Henson	Hidden Figures	Katherine Goble Johnson
2016 (43rd)	Felicity Jones	Rogue One: A Star Wars Story	Jyn Erso
2016 (43rd)	Jennifer Lawrence	Passengers	Aurora Lane
2016 (43rd)	Narges Rashidi	Under the Shadow	Shideh
2017 (44th)	Gal Gadot	Wonder Woman	Diana Prince / Wonder Woman
2017 (44th)	Sally Hawkins	The Shape of Water	Elisa Esposito
2017 (44th)	Frances McDormand	Three Billboards Outside Ebbing, Missouri	Mildred Hayes
2017 (44th)	Lupita Nyong'o	Black Panther	Nakia
2017 (44th)	Rosamund Pike	Hostiles	Rosalie Quaid
2017 (44th)	Daisy Ridley	Star Wars: The Last Jedi	Rey
2017 (44th)	Emma Watson	Beauty and the Beast	Belle
2018/2019 (45th)	Jamie Lee Curtis	Halloween	Laurie Strode
2018/2019 (45th)	Emily Blunt	Mary Poppins Returns	Mary Poppins
2018/2019 (45th)	Toni Collette	Hereditary	Annie Graham
2018/2019 (45th)	Nicole Kidman	Destroyer	Erin Bell
2018/2019 (45th)	Brie Larson	Captain Marvel	Carol Danvers / Vers / Captain Marvel
2018/2019 (45th)	Lupita Nyong'o	Us	Adelaide Wilson / Red
2018/2019 (45th)	Octavia Spencer	Ma	Sue Ann "Ma" Ellington
2019/2020 (46th)	Elisabeth Moss	The Invisible Man	Cecilia "Cee" Kass
2019/2020 (46th)	Rebecca Ferguson	Doctor Sleep	Rose the Hat
2019/2020 (46th)	Natalie Portman	Lucy in the Sky	Lucy Cola
2019/2020 (46th)	Daisy Ridley	Star Wars: The Rise of Skywalker	Rey
2019/2020 (46th)	Margot Robbie	Birds of Prey	Harley Quinn
2019/2020 (46th)	Charlize Theron	The Old Guard	Andy
2019/2020 (46th)	Liu Yifei	Mulan	Mulan

=== 2020s ===
Year	Actress	Film	Character
2021/2022 (50th)	Michelle Yeoh	Everything Everywhere All at Once	Evelyn Quan Wang
2021/2022 (50th)	Cate Blanchett	Nightmare Alley	Dr. Lilith Ritter
2021/2022 (50th)	Emily Blunt	A Quiet Place Part II	Evelyn Abbott
2021/2022 (50th)	Zoë Kravitz	The Batman	Selina Kyle / Catwoman
2021/2022 (50th)	Keke Palmer	Nope	Emerald "Em" Haywood
2021/2022 (50th)	Emma Stone	Cruella	Estella / Cruella
2021/2022 (50th)	Zendaya	Spider-Man: No Way Home	MJ
2022/2023 (51st)	Margot Robbie	Barbie	Barbie
2022/2023 (51st)	Viola Davis	The Woman King	General Nanisca
2022/2023 (51st)	Mia Goth	Pearl	Pearl
2022/2023 (51st)	Amber Midthunder	Prey	Naru
2022/2023 (51st)	Zoe Saldaña	Avatar: The Way of Water	Neytiri
2022/2023 (51st)	Anya Taylor-Joy	The Menu	Margot Mills / Erin
2023/2024 (52nd)	Demi Moore	The Substance	Elisabeth Sparkle
2023/2024 (52nd)	Willa Fitzgerald	Strange Darling	The Lady
2023/2024 (52nd)	Lupita Nyong'o	A Quiet Place: Day One	Samira
2023/2024 (52nd)	Winona Ryder	Beetlejuice Beetlejuice	Lydia Deetz
2023/2024 (52nd)	Naomi Scott	Smile 2	Skye Riley
2023/2024 (52nd)	June Squibb	Thelma	Thelma Post
2023/2024 (52nd)	Anya Taylor-Joy	Furiosa: A Mad Max Saga	Furiosa
2024/2025 (53rd)	Elle Fanning	Predator: Badlands	Thia; Tessa
2024/2025 (53rd)	Rachel Brosnahan	Superman	Lois Lane
2024/2025 (53rd)	Cynthia Erivo	Wicked: For Good	Elphaba Thropp
2024/2025 (53rd)	Julia Garner	Weapons	Justine Gandy
2024/2025 (53rd)	Vanessa Kirby	The Fantastic Four: First Steps	Sue Storm / Invisible Woman
2024/2025 (53rd)	Zoe Saldaña	Avatar: Fire and Ash	Neytiri
2024/2025 (53rd)	Emma Stone	Bugonia	Michelle Fuller

== Multiple nominations ==
6 nominations

- Natalie Portman

5 nominations

- Emily Blunt
- Jamie Lee Curtis
- Jodie Foster
- Nicole Kidman
- Naomi Watts
- Sigourney Weaver

4 nominations

- Cate Blanchett
- Angelina Jolie
- Jennifer Lawrence

3 nominations

- Jessica Chastain
- Margot Kidder
- Julianne Moore
- Michelle Pfeiffer
- Daisy Ridley
- Zoe Saldaña
- Ally Sheedy
- Jessica Tandy
- Charlize Theron
- Lupita Nyong'o
- Winona Ryder

2 nominations

- Amy Adams
- Karen Allen
- Nancy Allen
- Kathy Bates
- Kate Beckinsale
- Helena Bonham Carter
- Sandra Bullock
- Ellen Burstyn
- Neve Campbell
- Geena Davis
- Melinda Dillon
- Kirsten Dunst
- Carrie Fisher
- Linda Hamilton
- Anjelica Huston
- Catherine Keener
- Jennifer Lopez
- Frances McDormand
- Penelope Ann Miller
- Demi Moore
- Rosamund Pike
- Margot Robbie
- Sharon Stone
- Meryl Streep
- Emma Stone
- Anya Taylor-Joy
- Uma Thurman
- Mia Wasikowska
- Michelle Yeoh

== Multiple wins ==
2 wins

- Sandra Bullock
- Jamie Lee Curtis
- Jodie Foster
- Demi Moore
- Natalie Portman
- Naomi Watts
