= Target of an Assassin =

1978 film by Peter Collinson

- Directed by: Peter Collinson
- Starring: Anthony Quinn
- Music by: Hennie Bekker
- Production company: Heyns Film Productions
- Release date: 10 February 1977
- Running time: 105 min.
- Country: South Africa
- Language: English
- Budget: $2 million

Target of an Assassin is a 1977 South African thriller film directed by Peter Collinson and starring Anthony Quinn and John Phillip Law. It was completed in South Africa in 1976 as Tigers Don't Cry, but was not put into general American release for nearly nine years. Other alternate titles include African Rage, The Long Shot, and Fatal Assassin. Based on the novel Running Scared by Jon Burmeister.

== Plot ==
The film is set in a South African hospital. Top-billed Anthony Quinn plays a male nurse, Hobday, assigned to care for a foreign President (Simon Sabela), who escaped an assassination attempt on the day he arrived in South Africa for an official visit. With many threats against his well-being, the leader is heavily guarded around the clock. Hobday manages to kidnap his patient for strictly personal gain, unaware that a hired sniper is still attempting to take the life of the foreign leader while in Hobday's custody. This leads to a series of curious plot twists leading to a climactic scene with cable cars on a high plateau ridge.

== Cast ==
- Anthony Quinn as Ernest Hobday
- John Phillip Law as Shannon
- Simon Sabela as President Lunda
- Marius Weyers as Colonel Albert Pahler
- Sandra Prinsloo as Sister Janet Hobart
