= Kjell Nilsson (actor) =

Swedish weightlifter and actor (1949–2026)

- Born: 19 December 1949; Gothenburg, Sweden
- Died: 2 July 2026 (aged 76); Queensland, Australia
- Occupations: Weight lifter; actor

Kjell Nilsson (19 December 1949 – 2 July 2026) was a Swedish Olympic-class weight lifter and actor. His best known role was his 1981 portrayal of "Lord Humungus", the leader of the marauding wasteland gang in Mad Max 2.

== Life and career ==
Nilsson was an Olympic-class weight lifter who was born in Gothenburg, Sweden. He moved to Australia in 1980 to train Swedish athletes for the Moscow Olympics. In Australia, he met actress Kate Ferguson, and they married in Sweden. She persuaded him to return to Australia and to look for work in the Australian film industry.

In the 1981 post-apocalyptic science fiction action film Mad Max 2 (also known as Mad Max: The Road Warrior), he played the main antagonist "Lord Humungus", the leader of a gang of marauders that besiege a settler compound in the Australian wastelands. He leads a rag-tag band of biker-berserkers, and he gives speeches to the settlers exhorting them to surrender, while utilizing psychological warfare. Time magazine's Richard Corliss stated that in Nilsson's portrayal, "malevolence courses through his huge pectorals, [and] pulses visibly under his bald, sutured scalp."

A year later, he appeared in The Pirate Movie (1982), a musical and comedy film directed by Ken Annakin and starring Christopher Atkins and Kristy McNichol. In 1984, he had a role in the television film Man of Letters, and in 1987, he played the role of a nurse in The Edge of Power.

Nilsson died from kidney disease on 2 July 2026, at the age of 76.

== Filmography ==
- Mad Max 2 (1981) – Lord Humungus
- The Pirate Movie (1982) – Pirate
- The Edge of Power (1987) – Jorma
