= Tomorrow Never Comes =

- Theatrical release poster`
- Directed by: Peter Collinson
- Written by: Sydney Banks; David Pursall; Jack Seddon
- Starring: Oliver Reed; Susan George
- Cinematography: François Protat
- Edited by: John Shirley
- Music by: Roy Budd
- Production companies: Classic; Montreal Trust; Neffbourne
- Distributed by: Rank Film Distributors (UK); Cinépix Film Properties (CFP)
- Release date: 2 March 1978
- Running time: 109 minutes
- Countries: Canada; United Kingdom
- Language: English
- Budget: CAD 2,341,000

Tomorrow Never Comes (also known as Tomorrow Never Comes ... A Story of Today) is a 1978 British-Canadian crime film directed by Peter Collinson and starring Oliver Reed and Susan George. It was written by Sydney Banks, David Pursall and Jack Seddon.

== Plot ==
Coming back from an extended business trip, Frank discovers that his girlfriend Janie is now working at a new resort hotel where the owner has given her a permanent place to stay, as well as other gifts, in exchange for her affections. As they fight over this development, tensions between Frank and Janie escalate out of control until he is holding her hostage in a standoff with the police. As the negotiators try to talk Frank into giving himself up, the desperate man feels himself being pushed further and further into a corner.

== Cast ==
- Oliver Reed as Jim Wilson
- Susan George as Janie
- Raymond Burr as Burke
- John Ireland as Captain
- Stephen McHattie as Frank
- Donald Pleasence as Dr. Todd
- Paul Koslo as Willy
- John Osborne as Robert L. Lyne
- Cec Linder as Milton
- Richard Donat as Ray
- Delores Etienne as Hilda

== Production ==
The film was a "tax shelter co-production" between the UK and Canada. The picture was filmed in the province of Quebec. Finance came partly from the Rank Organisation.

Susan George had worked with Peter Collinson before in Up the Junction (1968) and Fright (1971).

== Awards ==
The film was entered into the 11th Moscow International Film Festival.

== Reception ==
The Monthly Film Bulletin wrote: "The latest in the lamentable series of Anglo-Canadian co-productions is an exploitative, crude combination of several recent genres: the disillusioned cop cycle, the problems of urban violence and the sinister workings of local authorities. The failure of any of these themes to establish themselves coherently is due mainly to a script which is, at one extreme, embarrassingly over-written and, at the other, replete with staccato exchanges which leave the actors floundering. ... Behind the exploding violence (and threats of even more), there remains the glimmer of a social point, but the determinedly sleazy tone and hysterically pointed direction soon snuff it out."
