= Brian Hannant =

Australian filmmaker (born 1940)

Brian Hannant (born 13 February 1940) is an Australian filmmaker who worked for many years at Film Australia.

== Select Credits ==
- 3 to Go (1970) - director
- Flashpoint (1972) - writer, director
- Travellin' Round (1975) - writer, director
- Mad Max 2 (1981) - co-writer, second unit director
- The Time Guardian (1987) - writer, director
- Resistance (1992) - co-writer
