= Susan George (actress) =

English actress

Susan George MBE
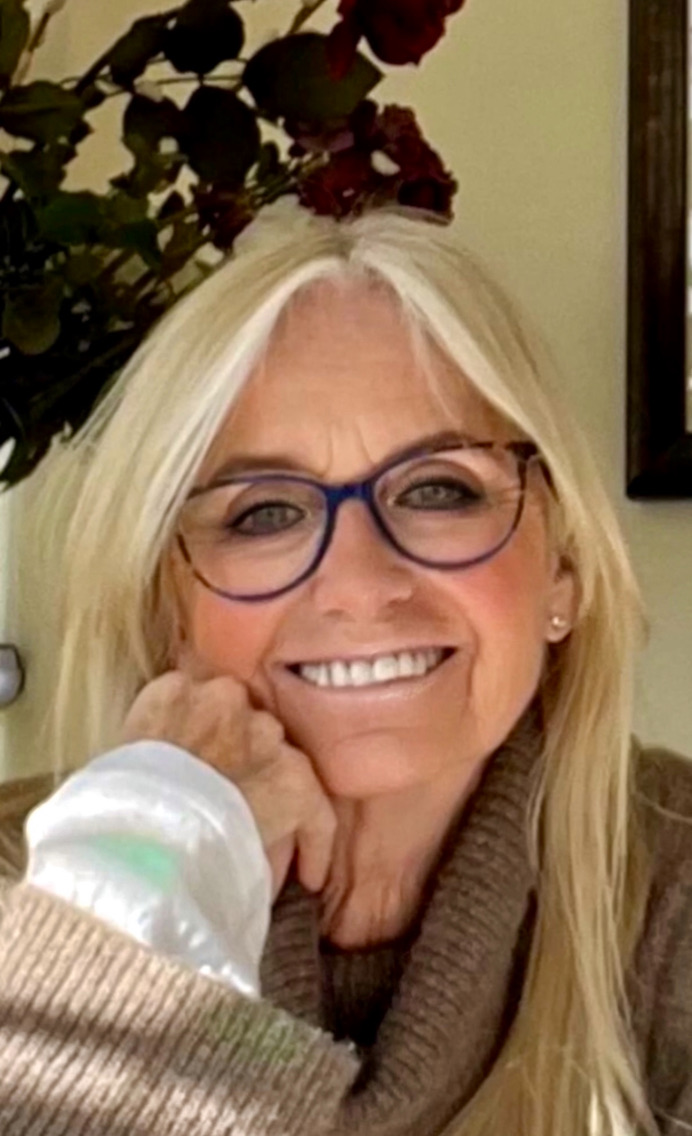
- George in 2025
- Born: Susan Melody George; 26 July 1950 (age 76); Surbiton, Surrey, England
- Occupation: Actress
- Years active: 1962–present
- Spouse: Simon MacCorkindale (m. 1984; died 2010)
- Website: susangeorge.co.uk

Susan Melody George MBE (born 26 July 1950) is an English film and television actress. She is best known for appearing in films such as Straw Dogs (1971) with Dustin Hoffman, Dirty Mary, Crazy Larry (1974) with Peter Fonda and Mandingo (1975) with Ken Norton.

In the early and mid 1970s, George played provocative, sometimes controversial roles (such as Amy Sumner in Straw Dogs, and Blanche Maxwell in Mandingo) and became typecast. Cinema writer Leslie Halliwell described her as a "British leading lady, former child actress; usually typed as sexpot".

Her lighter side was apparent in some of her TV appearances, such as in an episode ("The Gold Napoleon") of The Persuaders (1971) with Roger Moore and Tony Curtis. In 1988, George marked her film-producing debut with Stealing Heaven.

Also on TV, George played the role of Vicky Duncan in "Czech Mate", an acclaimed episode of Hammer House of Mystery and Suspense (1984).

== Early life ==
Susan Melody George was born on 26 July 1950 in Surbiton, Surrey, to Billie and Norman George, with sister, Pamela Anne George. She recalled spending many holidays at the caravan park in Font-y-Gary in South Wales as a child. She trained at the Corona Theatre School and has acted since the age of four.

== Career ==
She appeared in The Dickie Henderson Show in 1962 and started working steadily on television in shows such as ITV Television Playhouse, Swallows and Amazons and Weavers Green.

George had small roles in films such as The Sorcerers (1967) and Up the Junction (1968).

=== British stardom ===
George starred opposite Michael York in The Strange Affair (1968). She starred in All Neat in Black Stockings (1969) then the lead and starring role in Lola (also known as Twinky) in 1969 with Charles Bronson. Other starring roles include: Spring and Port Wine (1970) with James Mason, Eyewitness (1970) with director John Hough, Die Screaming, Marianne (1971) and Fright (1971) for director Peter Collinson. A number of her early films were made for EMI Films.

George's international breakthrough was starring opposite Dustin Hoffman in Straw Dogs (1971), a huge box office hit. When asked in a 2013 interview about working with Hoffman and director Sam Peckinpah in Straw Dogs, George said:

I had a love-hate relationship with Sam, but he was a brilliant director and a genius of his time. Dustin was a generous actor to work with, who could be intense at times, but had a great personality and an incredibly mischievous sense of humour. Making the film was a fantastic experience and one that I cherish to this day.

George went to Europe to appear in Sonny and Jed (1972).

=== US career ===
George received an offer to star in Dirty Mary, Crazy Larry (1974) for director John Hough, which was a big hit. Also popular was Mandingo (1975).

Less seen were Out of Season (1975), A Small Town in Texas (1976), Tintorera (1977) and Tomorrow Never Comes (1978).

George guest starred on television and was in Enter the Ninja (1981), Venom (1981), The House Where Evil Dwells (1982)

=== Later career ===
George moved into producing and later returned to England.

== Personal life ==
Susan George was married to Simon MacCorkindale from 1984 until his death in 2010. They did not have any children.

Before her relationship with MacCorkindale began in 1982, she had a four-year relationship with American singer Jack Jones from 1972–1976, and spent another four years as the partner of casino manager Derek Webster from 1977–1981.

George breeds Arabian horses and has a stud farm called Georgian Arabians.

In 2016 she launched the charity Lasting Life – the Simon MacCorkindale Legacy as a cancer support charity in memory of her husband. In the King's birthday honours list in June 2026 she was made an MBE for charitable service.

== Filmography ==
=== Film ===
Year	Title	Role	Notes
1965	Cup Fever	Vicky Davis	
1966	Davy Jones' Locker	Susan Haddock	
1967	The Sorcerers	Audrey	
1967	Billion Dollar Brain	Russian girl on train	(Uncredited)
1968	Up the Junction	Joyce	
1968	The Strange Affair	'Fred' March	
1969	All Neat in Black Stockings	Jill	
1969	Twinky	Twinky	
1970	The Looking Glass War	Susan	
1970	Spring and Port Wine	Hilda Crompton	
1970	Eyewitness	Pippa	
1970	Lola	Lola	
1971	Die Screaming, Marianne	Marianne	
1971	Fright	Amanda	
1971	Straw Dogs	Amy Sumner	
1972	Sonny and Jed	Sonny Lester Trigado	
1974	Dirty Mary, Crazy Larry	Mary Coombs	
1975	Mandingo	Blanche Maxwell	
1975	Out of Season	Joanna	
1976	A Small Town in Texas	Mary Lee Carter	
1977	Tintorera	Gabriella	
1978	Tomorrow Never Comes	Janie	
1981	Enter the Ninja	Mary Ann	
1981	Venom	Louise Andrews	
1982	The House Where Evil Dwells	Laura Fletcher	
1982	Kiss My Grits	Baby	
1983	The Jigsaw Man	Penelope Kimberley	
1986	Lightning, the White Stallion	Madame Rene	
1989	That Summer of White Roses	Ana	
2008	In Your Dreams	Barbara Wood-Ross	
2009	City of Life	Constance	
2014	Margery Booth: The Spy in the Eagle's Nest	Mrs. Ada Booth	
2023	1066	Queen Emma	

=== Television ===
Year	Title	Role	Notes
1963	ITV Television Playhouse	Jane/Jenny Warren	2 episode
1963	Swallows and Amazons	Kitty Walker	Miniseries
1965	The Human Jungle	Gina McCutcheon	Episode: "Heartbeats in a Tin Box"
1966	Weavers Green	Barbara Fielding	Episode: #1.25
1967	Armchair Theatre	Shop Girl	Episode: "Compensation Alice"
1967-8	Theatre 625	Young Barbara/Angela Buck	2 episodes
1968	Mystery and Imagination	Lucy Weston	Episode: "Dracula"
1970	Doctor in the House	Jenny	Episode: "May The Best Man..."
1970	Tales of Unease	Sarah Stone	Episode: "Ride, Ride"
1971	The Persuaders!	Michelle Devigne	Episode: "The Gold Napoleon"
1973	Dr. Jekyll and Mr. Hyde	Anne	TV film
1979-80	Tales of the Unexpected	Mary Marney/Mabel Taylor	2 episodes
1982	Computercide	Lisa Korter	TV film
1983	Pajama Tops	Mrs. Chavinet	TV film
1984	Masquerade	Megan	Episode: "The Defector"
1984	Hammer House of Mystery and Suspense	Vicky Duncan	Episode: "Czech Mate"
1986	Hotel	Barbara Fremont	Episode: "Hearts Divided"
1986	Blacke's Magic	Maggie	Episode: "Wax Poetic"
1986	This Is Your Life	(self)	Episode: "Susan George"
1988	Jack the Ripper	Catherine Eddowes	Miniseries
1990	The Castle of Adventure	Allie Mannering	All 8 episodes
1990	Counterstrike	Annette Morley	Episode: "Dealbreaker"
1992	Cluedo	Mrs. Peacock	6 episodes
1993	Stay Lucky	Samantha Mansfield	4 episodes
1995	Tales of Mystery and Imagination	Betty Wilson	Episode: "The Black Cat"
1995	The House That Mary Bought	Mary Close	TV film
2001	EastEnders	Margaret Walker	25 episodes
2026	Beyond Paradise	Mary Rhodes	Series 4 Episode 4

=== As executive producer ===
- Stealing Heaven (1988)
- That Summer of White Roses (1989)
- The House That Mary Bought (1995) (TV)

=== As miscellaneous crew ===
- Jackie Brown (1997) ('very special thanks')

== Awards and nominations ==
Year	Award	Category	Nominated work	Result
1983	10th Saturn Awards	Best Actress	The House Where Evil Dwells	Nominated
