= The Penthouse (1967 film) =

1967 British film by Peter Collinson

- Film Poster
- Directed by: Peter Collinson
- Written by: Peter Collinson
- Based on: The Meter Man; 1964 play by C. Scott Forbes
- Produced by: Harry Fine
- Starring: Terence Morgan; Suzy Kendall; Tony Beckley; Norman Rodway; Martine Beswick
- Cinematography: Arthur Lavis
- Edited by: John Trumper
- Music by: Johnny Hawksworth
- Production companies: Compton Films; Tahiti Films
- Distributed by: Paramount British Pictures
- Release date: 29 September 1967
- Running time: 96 minutes
- Country: United Kingdom
- Language: English
- Box office: $1,350,000 (US/ Canada)

The Penthouse is a 1967 British drama thriller film directed and written by Peter Collinson. It stars Terence Morgan and Suzy Kendall and was based on a 1964 play The Meter Man by Scott Forbes. The film was Collinson's directorial debut.

== Plot ==
Bruce Victor, a real estate agent, is a married man having an affair with Barbara. They are staying in a penthouse apartment that they've rented.

One morning, two men, Tom and Dick, who claim to be meter men, arrive but Barbara realizes their menacing intent when they lock the door and tie Bruce up to a chair. After she screams for help, Tom and Dick violate her with drugs and alcohol. Barbara then performs a striptease for them, and Dick later rapes her.

After Tom and Dick finally leave, Harry, a woman, who claims to be Tom and Dick's parole officer, arrives and brings them back up to make them apologize for what they did. However, the three tie Bruce and Barbara up to a chair, while they taunt them, saying that nobody will believe them if they tell anyone what happened in the penthouse that day. When the three leave, Barbara and Bruce manage to untie themselves. Bruce tells Barbara that they need to get out of there. Barbara, who now wants nothing to do with Bruce, shouts at him to go home. He leaves the apartment before Barbara makes her way out soon afterwards. Outside, they come across each other again before they part ways and walk off into the night.

== Cast ==
- Terence Morgan as Bruce Victor
- Suzy Kendall as Barbara Willison
- Tony Beckley as Tom
- Norman Rodway as Dick
- Martine Beswick as Harry

== Production ==
=== Filming ===
The film was shot at Twickenham Studios with sets designed by the art director Peter Mullins. The exterior shots of the high-rise apartment building were shot at the Wembley Point tower (now WEM Tower London) in Stonebridge Park, London.

=== Music ===
The song heard during the end credits "The World Is Full of Lonely Men", is sung by Lisa Shane with music and lyrics by Johnny Hawksworth and Hal Shaper, respectively.

== Critical reception ==
Monthly Film Bulletin said "Despite the cosmic implications of the three intruders being called Tom, Dick and Harry, nothing in The Penthouse manages to convince us that its events have any internal, psychological justification, or that they could possibly have occurred if Tom had not owned a flick-knife. What we are offered smacks of pornography in Pinter’s clothing. And there is something particularly distasteful about a double rape that takes place before breakfast. For if the film is lacking in subtlety, it is still more lacking in taste. And for those unable to share Collinson’s morbid fascination with his subject matter, the close-ups of Norman Rodway caressing Barbara’s underwear in the empty bedroom, or biting on a piece of salami before proceeding to rape her, will be merely embarrassing. Suzy Kendall gives a suitably ambiguous performance as the violated heroine (is she supposed to enjoy it?) while Terence Morgan fails utterly to convince as her stuffed shirt lover."

The Radio Times Guide to Films gave the film 1/5 stars, writing: "Married estate agent Terence Morgan and his mistress Suzy Kendall are terrorised in their love nest by Tom and Dick (Tony Beckley and Norman Rodway), a knife-wielding pair of villains – Harry turns up later. After tying up the estate agent, they force him to watch them abuse the girlfriend as well as listen to self-justifying monologues and musings on the sad state of the world. The original stage play was probably more effective; the film version, however, comes across as grim, tasteless and pretentious."

Leslie Halliwell said: "Thoroughly objectionable and unpleasant melodrama with no attractive characters and no attempt to explain itself."
