= Mad Max 2 =

1981 Australian post-apocalyptic action film

- Theatrical release poster, which mismatches Lord Humungus and Wez.
- Directed by: George Miller
- Written by: Terry Hayes; George Miller; Brian Hannant
- Based on: Characters created by: George Miller; Byron Kennedy
- Produced by: Byron Kennedy
- Starring: Mel Gibson; Bruce Spence; Kjell Nilsson; Emil Minty
- Cinematography: Dean Semler
- Edited by: David Stiven; Tim Wellburn; Michael Balson
- Music by: Brian May
- Production company: Kennedy Miller Entertainment
- Distributed by: Warner Bros. (through Roadshow Film Distributors)
- Release date: 24 December 1981
- Running time: 96 minutes
- Country: Australia
- Language: English
- Budget: A$4.5 million
- Box office: US$36 million (rentals)

Mad Max 2 (released as The Road Warrior in the United States) is a 1981 Australian post-apocalyptic dystopian action film directed by George Miller, who co-wrote it with Terry Hayes and Brian Hannant. It is the sequel to Mad Max (1979) and the second installment in the Mad Max franchise. The film stars Mel Gibson reprising his role as "Mad Max" Rockatansky and follows a hardened man who helps a community of settlers to defend themselves against a roving band of marauders. Filming took place in locations around Broken Hill, in the Outback of New South Wales.

Mad Max 2 was released in Australia on 24 December 1981 to widespread critical acclaim; praise was given to Gibson's performance, the musical score, cinematography, action sequences and costume design, with its sparing use of dialogue in particular being unprecedented for an action film. It was also a box office success, and the film's post-apocalyptic and punk aesthetics helped popularise the genre in film and fiction writing. At the 10th Saturn Awards, the film won Best International Film and was nominated for five more awards: Best Director, Best Actor for Gibson, Best Supporting Actor for Bruce Spence, Best Writing, and Best Costumes for Norma Moriceau. Mad Max 2 is widely hailed as both one of the greatest action films of all time and one of the greatest sequels ever made, and fan clubs for the film and "road warrior"-themed activities continue into the 21st century.

The film was followed by Mad Max Beyond Thunderdome in 1985.

== Plot ==
After a global war results in widespread oil shortages and ecocide, civilisation collapses and the world descends into barbarism. Former policeman Max Rockatansky, haunted by the death of his family, (Note: As depicted in Mad Max (1979).) drives around the desert Outback of what was once Australia, scavenging for food and petrol with his dog. He outmanoeuvres a group of marauders led by biker Wez using his driving skills and a shotgun. He steals petrol from the wrecked vehicles of one of his pursuers and inspects a wrecked semi-trailer and prime mover.

Later, Max tries collecting an apparently abandoned gyrocopter's fuel, but is ambushed by the pilot. Max overpowers the man with his dog's help, sparing his life in return for being led to a working oil refinery the pilot has discovered. They arrive during the daily attack on the facility by a motorised gang, of which Wez is a member.

The next day, Max witnesses cars leave the besieged compound and get chased down by marauders. He rescues Nathan, the sole survivor of one car, and strikes a deal to return him to the complex in exchange for fuel, but the man dies after Max gets him back, and the leader of the settlers, Pappagallo, says the deal died with Nathan. The settlers are about to confiscate Max's car and cast him out of their compound when the marauders return to negotiate. A feral child who lives in the refinery compound kills Wez's partner with a metal boomerang and Wez wants revenge, but the gang's leader, a masked man called "Lord Humungus", offers to spare the settlers' lives in exchange for their fuel supply and leaves for the day. However, the settlers are divided over whether or not they can trust Humungus.

Max offers his own deal: he will bring them the semi-truck he saw earlier so they can try to haul away their tanker full of oil, if they return his car and give him as much fuel as he can carry. The settlers agree, and that night Max sneaks past the marauders on foot carrying fuel for the truck. He encounters the Gyro Captain and forces him to carry the gasoline to the truck, which he gets started. It is somewhat damaged as Max passes through the marauders' encampment en route to the refinery, but he makes it, followed by the gyrocopter.

Max refuses Pappagallo's entreaty to accompany the settlers to a fabled northern paradise, (Note: Revealed by a set of postcards to be the Sunshine Coast.) opting instead to collect his fuel and leave. Wez catches him using Humungus's nitrous oxide-equipped vehicle and causes him to crash. A Marauder kills Max's dog and is about to kill the seriously injured Max when Marauder Toadie attempts to siphon the fuel from the tanks of Max's car, triggering the vehicle to self-destruct. Left for dead, Max is rescued by the Gyro Captain and returned to the compound.

Despite his injuries, Max insists on driving the repaired truck during the escape. His support consists of the Gyro Captain, Pappagallo in a separate vehicle, three of the settlers on the outside of the armoured tanker, and the Feral Kid, who jumps on the truck as it is leaving. The marauders pursue the tanker, allowing the remaining settlers to flee their compound in a caravan of smaller vehicles after rigging the refinery to explode.

Pappagallo and the three settlers are killed and the Gyro Captain is shot down. Max turns the truck around and, as he is fighting with Wez, Humungus collides with the truck head on, killing Wez and himself. The truck rolls off the road and the surviving marauders survey the scene, only to abandon their chase when they see the tanker leaking sand and not gas. As Max carries the Feral Kid from the wrecked tanker, he inspects the sand pouring out. The Gyro Captain drives up and the two share a grin as Max realises the tanker was a diversion the whole time. They rendezvous with the settlers, who transported the fuel in oil drums inside their vehicles.

The Gyro Captain succeeds Pappagallo as leader of the settlers and takes them north. The grown Feral Kid, "Chief of the Great Northern Tribe," reveals in voice-over that he never saw "the Road Warrior" again.

== Cast ==
- Mel Gibson as "Mad Max" Rockatansky, a former member of the Australian highway patrol (the Main Force Patrol, MFP) who, after a biker gang killed his family, left the force and hunted down and killed all of the gang members. The trauma of the events of Mad Max transformed him into an embittered "shell of a man", but in this film, he still elects to assist the settlers with their plan.
- Bruce Spence as The Gyro Captain, a wanderer who searches for fuel and supplies using a ramshackle old gyrocopter. He, too, decides to throw in his lot with the settlers and help defend their compound. Writing for Time, Richard Corliss called the Captain "a deranged parody of the World War I aerial ace: scarecrow skinny, gaily clad, sporting a James Coburn smile with advanced caries".
- Mike Preston as Pappagallo, the idealistic leader of a group of settlers barricaded in an oil refinery. Even though the settlers' compound is besieged by a violent gang, Pappagallo "carries the weight of his predicament with swaggering dignity." The novelization of the film expanded on Pappagallo's history, describing him as a top executive for one of the "7 Sisters" major petroleum firms who lost his family in the war and escaped to the wastelands, where he would join up with other refugees and become a leader of their efforts to establish a new civilization.
- Max Phipps as The Toadie, the crier of Humungus's gang and a classic sycophant.
- Vernon Wells as Wez, a mohawked, leather-clad biker who serves as Humungus's lieutenant. Vincent Canby, writing for The New York Times, called Wez the "most evil of The Humungus's followers...[a] huge brute who rides around on his bike, snarling psychotically." In a 1985 interview with Danny Peary, Miller said the characters of Wez and Max are near mirror images of each other. In 2011, Empire magazine listed Wez as the greatest movie henchman of all time.
- Kjell Nilsson as Lord Humungus, the violent, yet charismatic and articulate, leader of a "vicious gang of post-holocaust, motorcycle-riding vandals" who loot, rape, and kill the few remaining wasteland-dwellers. In the interview with Danny Peary, Miller posited that he thought the character "was a former military officer who suffered severe facial burns", and that he "might have served in the same outfit as his counterpart, Pappagallo."
- Emil Minty as The Feral Kid, an eight-year-old boy who lives in the wasteland near the oil refinery. He speaks only in growls and grunts, wears shorts and boots made from hide, and defends himself with a metal boomerang that he can catch using an improvised mail glove.
- Virginia Hey as Warrior Woman, a settler who initially distrusts Max.
- William Zappa as Zetta, a settler.
- Arkie Whiteley as The Captain's Girl, a beautiful young settler who chooses to stay with her compatriots rather than escape with the Gyro Captain, prompting him to stay as well.
- Steven J. Spears as The Mechanic, a settler who is paraplegic.
- Syd Heylen as Curmudgeon, an elderly settler who wears a military helmet and decorations.
- Moira Claux as "Big" Rebecca, a settler who wields a bow and arrow and initially wants to take Humungus's offer of safe passage if they abandon their compound.
- David Downer as Nathan, one of the settlers who leaves the compound to look for a truck to tow the oil tanker. He is wounded by some of Humungus's bikers and dies shortly after Max brings him back to the refinery.
- David Slingsby as Quiet Man, a settler.
- Kristoffer Greaves as Mechanic's Assistant, a settler.
- Max Fairchild as Broken Victim, a settler who is caught and tied to the front of Humungus's car. Gibson and Fairchild are the only two actors who appear in both Mad Max and Mad Max 2, though Fairchild portrays a different character in each film.
- Tyler Coppin as Defiant Victim, a settler who is caught and tied to the front of Humungus's car.
- Jerry O'Sullivan (credited as Jimmy Brown) as The Golden Youth, Wez's companion, who is killed by the Feral Kid's boomerang.

== Production ==
=== Development ===
Following the release of Mad Max, director George Miller tried to develop a rock and roll movie, the working title of which was Roxanne. After working together on the novelization of Mad Max, Miller and Terry Hayes teamed up in Los Angeles to write Roxanne, but the script was ultimately shelved. Miller then became intrigued with the idea of returning to the world of Mad Max, as a larger budget would allow him to be more ambitious. He said: "Making Mad Max was a very unhappy experience for me. I had absolutely no control over the final product", but "There was strong pressure to make a sequel, and I felt we could do a better job with a second movie." Inspired by Joseph Campbell's The Hero with a Thousand Faces and the work of Carl Jung, as well as the films of Akira Kurosawa, Miller recruited Hayes to join the production as a scriptwriter. Brian Hannant also came on board as co-writer, first assistant director, and second unit director.

=== Filming ===
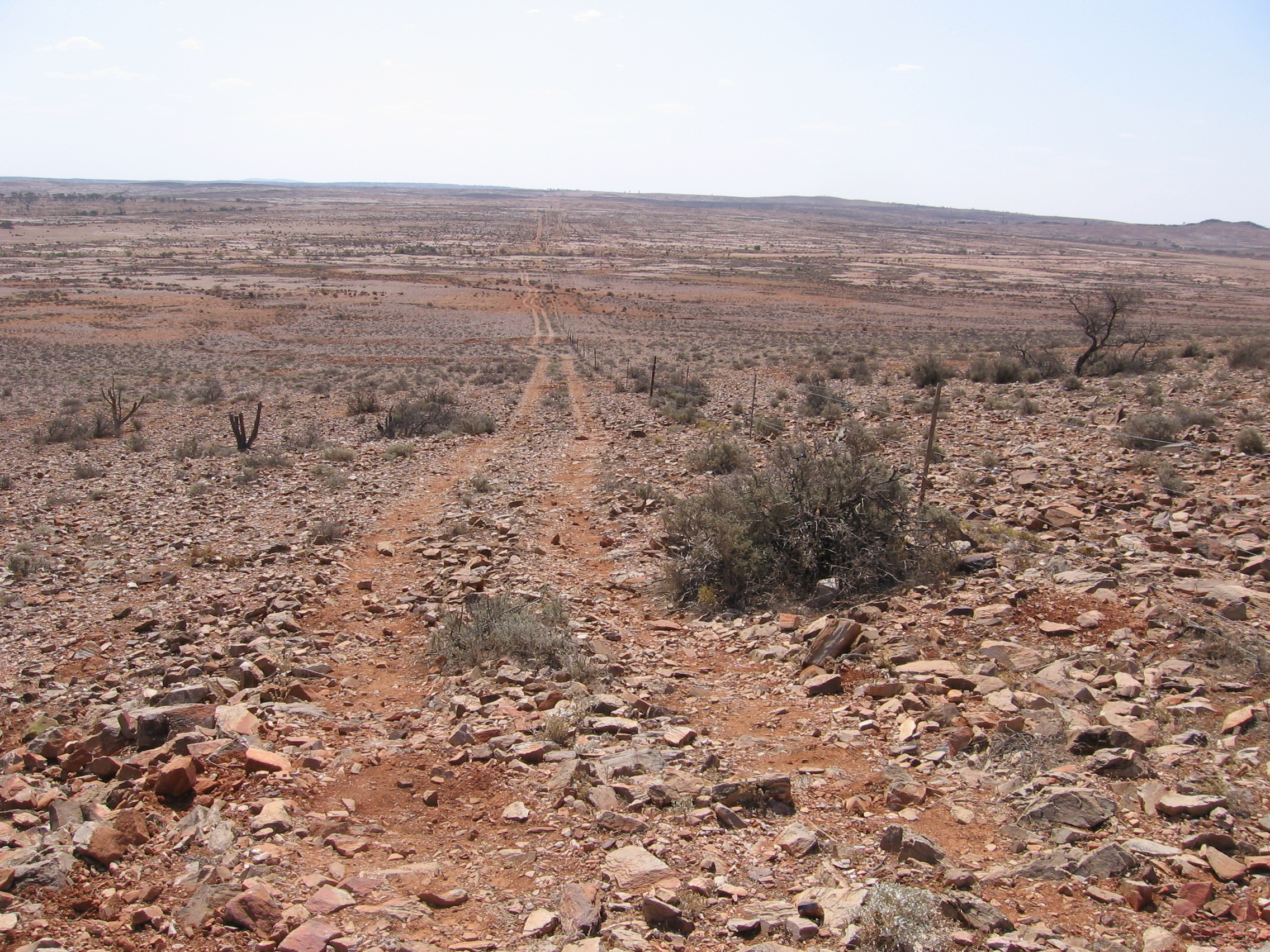
Filming took place in the desert surrounding the remote mining town of Broken Hill, New South Wales.

Principal photography took place over the course of twelve weeks in the winter of 1981 near Broken Hill, New South Wales. The scene where the Pursuit Special rolls over and explodes was shot at Wilangee Road near the Mundi Mundi Plains lookout, just outside of Silverton. Filming also took place at The Pinnacles, in Western Australia, which is where the set of the oil refinery compound was constructed.

In one scene, stunt coordinator Guy Norris broke his femur when he flew off his motorcycle and his leg hit the car. His injury is visible in the released film.

=== Music ===
The musical score for Mad Max 2 was composed and conducted by Australian composer Brian May, who had also composed the music for Mad Max. A soundtrack album was released by Varèse Sarabande in 1982.

=== Censorship ===
The original cut of the film was more bloody and violent, but it was cut down heavily to receive an "M" rating from Australian censors. Entire scenes and sequences were deleted completely, and others were edited. When the film was submitted to the MPAA in the United States, two additional scenes were shortened (the scene in which Wez pulls an arrow out of his arm and the one in which he pulls the boomerang out of the Golden Youth's head). Although the version of the film that includes those scenes before they were trimmed down for the MPAA survives, no version without the previous deletions exists.

== Reception ==
=== Box office ===
Mad Max 2 was a commercial success, grossing A$10.8 million in Australia alone, which was double what Mad Max had earned in the country which was at its time, the highest-grossing Australian film at the Australian box office. Despite doubling its predecessor box office, however, Mad Max 2 never obtained the national record as Gallipoli was released earlier in 1981 and grossed A$11.7 million in Australia.

In the United States, with a gross of US$23.6 million and theatrical rentals of $11 million, the film also outperformed Mad Max. When that film was released in the U.S. in 1982, it did not receive a proper release from its distributor, American International Pictures, as AIP was in the final stages of a change of ownership after being bought by Filmways, Inc. a year earlier, and its box office was affected. Warner Bros. decided to release Mad Max 2 in the United States, but, recognising the first film was not well known in North America (although it was becoming more popular through cable channel showings), they decided to change the name of the sequel to The Road Warrior. The advertising for the film, including print ads, trailers, and TV commercials, did not refer to the Max character at all and shied away from the fact that the film was a sequel. For the majority of American viewers, their first inkling of The Road Warrior being a sequel to Mad Max was when they saw the black and white, archival footage from the first film during the prologue of the second. When Vestron Video later released Mad Max on home video, they capitalized by labeling it "the thrilling predecessor to The Road Warrior".

Outside of the U.S., the film earned rentals of $25 million (including Australia), for a worldwide total of $36 million, making it the highest-grossing Australian film worldwide.

=== Critical response ===
The film received highly positive reviews and is regarded by many critics as one of the best films of 1981. On review aggregator website Rotten Tomatoes, the film holds an approval rating of 94% based on reviews from 62 critics, with an average rating of 8.40/10; the site's "critics consensus" reads: "The Road Warrior is everything a bigger-budgeted Mad Max sequel should be: bigger, faster, louder, but definitely not dumber." On Metacritic, the film has a rating of 77 out of 100 based on 15 reviews, indicating "generally favourable reviews".

Film critic Roger Ebert of the Chicago Sun-Times gave the film three-and-a-half stars out of four, praised its "skillful filmmaking", and called it "a film of pure action, of kinetic energy", which is "one of the most relentlessly aggressive movies ever made". While Ebert pointed out the film does not develop its "vision of a violent future world ... with characters and dialogue", and uses only the "barest possible bones of a plot", he praised its action sequences. Ebert called the climactic chase sequence "unbelievably well-sustained" and stated that the "special effects and stunts ... are spectacular", creating a "frightening, sometimes disgusting, and (if the truth be told) exhilarating" effect.

In his review for The New York Times, Vincent Canby wrote: "Never has a film's vision of the post-nuclear-holocaust world seemed quite as desolate and as brutal, or as action-packed and sometimes as funny as in George Miller's apocalyptic The Road Warrior, an extravagant film fantasy that looks like a sadomasochistic comic book come to life". Writing for Newsweek, Charles Michener praised Mel Gibson's "easy, unswaggering masculinity", saying that his "hint of Down Under humor may be quintessentially Australian but is also the stuff of an international male star".

Gary Arnold, in his review for The Washington Post, wrote: "While he seems to let triumph slip out of his grasp, Miller is still a prodigious talent, capable of a scenic and emotional amplitude that recalls the most stirring attributes in great action directors like Kurosawa, Peckinpah and Leone". Pauline Kael called Mad Max 2 a "mutant" film that was "sprung from virtually all action genres", creating "one continuous spurt of energy" by using "jangly, fast editing", but criticised Miller's "attempt to tap into the universal concept of the hero", stating that this attempt "makes the film joyless", "sappy", and "sentimental".

Richard Scheib called Mad Max 2 "one of the few occasions where a sequel makes a dramatic improvement in quality over its predecessor." He called it a "kinetic comic-book of a film" and an "exhilarating non-stop rollercoaster ride of a film that contains some of the most exciting stunts and car crashes ever put on screen." Scheib stated that the film transforms the "post-holocaust landscape into the equivalent of a Western frontier", such that "Mel Gibson's Max could just as easily be Clint Eastwood's tight-lipped Man With No Name" helping protect "decent frightened folk" from the "marauding Redskins".

Christopher John reviewed The Road Warrior in Ares Magazine #13 and commented that "Its taut scripting, exceptional performances, and pulse-pounding pacing, which leaves an audience breathless, combined to make it one of the best SF films of the year. It also has the courage to show what the face of death really looks like. Mel Gibson's portrayal of Max is hard, bitter and realistic; he is neither hero nor coward, but a man caught up in a mad future which he confronts unafraid." The Encyclopedia of Science Fiction says Mad Max 2, "with all its comic-strip energy and vividness ... is exploitation cinema at its most inventive."

=== Accolades ===
At the 24th Australian Film Institute Awards, the film won Best Direction, Best Editing, Best Production Design, Best Sound, and Best Costume Design, and it was nominated for Best Cinematography and Best Original Music Score; it received the most nominations and wins of any film at the ceremony, but it was not nominated for Best Film. At the Academy of Science Fiction, Fantasy and Horror Films' 10th Saturn Awards, the film won the award for Best International Film and generated nominations for Best Director, Best Actor (Mel Gibson), Best Supporting Actor (Bruce Spence), Best Writing, and Best Costumes. Additionally, the film won the Los Angeles Film Critics Association Award for Best Foreign Film and was nominated for the Hugo Award for Best Dramatic Presentation, and George Miller won the Grand Prize at the Avoriaz Fantastic Film Festival for his work on the film.

=== Legacy ===
The film's depiction of a post-apocalyptic future has so widely influenced other filmmakers and science fiction writers that its gritty "junkyard society of the future look ... is almost taken for granted in the modern science-fiction action film." The dystopian, apocalyptic, and post-apocalyptic themes and imagery in the Mad Max series of films have inspired some artists to recreate the look and feel of some aspects of the series in their work, and fan clubs and "road warrior"-themed activities continue into the 21st century.

In 2008, Mad Max 2 was selected by Empire magazine as one of "The 500 Greatest Movies of All Time". Similarly, The New York Times placed the film on its "Best 1000 Movies Ever" list. Entertainment Weekly ranked Mad Max 2 93rd on its list of the "100 Greatest Movies of All Time" in 1999 and 41st on its updated list of the "All-Time 100 Greatest Films" in 2013, and the publication ranked the character of Mad Max 11th on its list of "The All Time Coolest Heroes in Pop Culture". In 2016, James Charisma of Playboy ranked the film 11th on a list of "15 Sequels That Are Way Better Than the Originals".

A museum dedicated to Mad Max 2 was established in 2010 in the small town of Silverton (which is 25 kilometres from Broken Hill in New South Wales) by Adrian and Linda Bennett, who had built a collection of Mad Max props and memorabilia after moving to Silverton.

In 2025, The Hollywood Reporter listed Mad Max 2 as having the best stunts of 1981.

== See also ==
- List of cult films
- List of films considered the best
- Seven Sisters (oil companies), a conspiracy theory referred to in the film
- "Two Tribes", a song inspired by the opening of this film

== Bibliography ==
- Melvin Zed (2025). Mad Max 2 : les guerriers de la route (1979-1982) (in French). Rififi. ISBN 9782958046842..
