= Ken Thorne =

English composer (1924–2014)

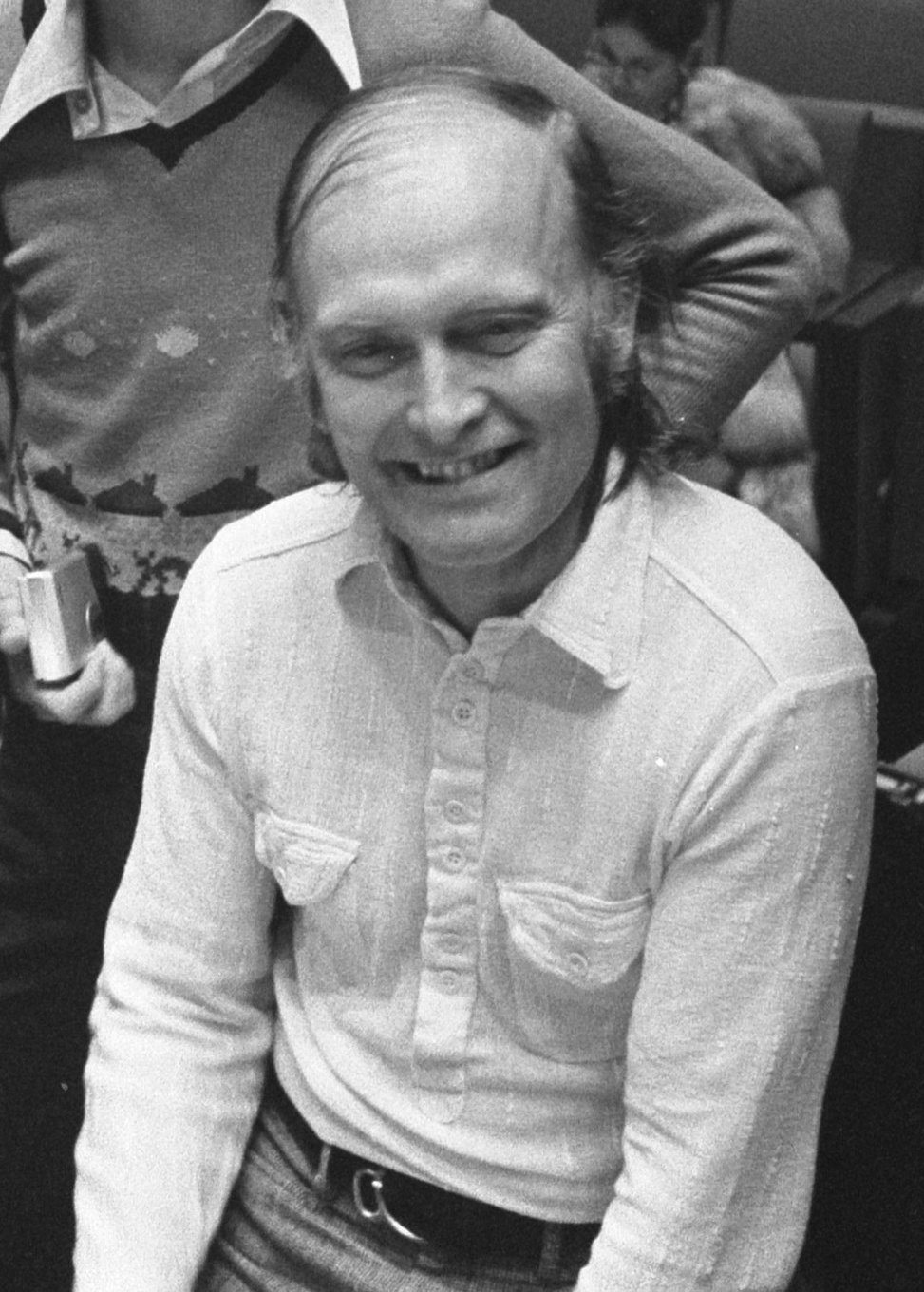
- Thorne in 1974.

Background information
- Born: Kenneth Thorne; 26 January 1924; Dereham, Norfolk, England
- Died: 9 July 2014 (aged 90) West Hills, California, U.S.
- Genres: Film score; big band; pop
- Occupations: Composer, conductor, arranger
- Instruments: Piano, organ

Kenneth Thorne (26 January 1924 – 9 July 2014) was an English composer, conductor, and arranger. He was known for his film and television scores, particularly his collaborations with director Richard Lester. He won an Academy Award for his work on 1965 film version of the musical A Funny Thing Happened on the Way to the Forum, and was also a Grammy and Emmy Award nominee.

== Early life and education ==
Thorne was born in Dereham, Norfolk. He began his musical career as a pianist with the big bands of England during the 1940s, playing at night clubs and the dance halls. At age 27, Thorne decided to seriously study composition with private tutors at Cambridge and later studied the organ for five years in London, under Sidney Campbell and Harold Darke.

== Film scoring career ==
Thorne began composing scores for films in 1948.

When Henry Mancini was scoring Blake Edwards's 1968 film The Party with Peter Sellers, Thorne composed the soundtrack to Inspector Clouseau. He also composed the music scores for How I Won the War (1967), The Monkees movie Head (1968), The Magic Christian (1969) and The Ritz (1976).

From the 1980s, Ken Thorne mainly focused on his work for TV, working predominantly with director Kevin Connor.

His television work included the theme to the 1964 BBC series R3, and he also scored incidental music for The Persuaders! and The Zoo Gang in the 1970s. His later work included the score for the miniseries Return to Lonesome Dove in 1993.

Thorne also had an unexpected chart hit in 1963 when his cover version of Angelo Francesco Lavagnino's "Theme from The Legion's Last Patrol" (Concerto Disperato) reached #4 in the UK charts.

=== With Richard Lester ===
He was considered Richard Lester's composer of choice since their first work together on It's Trad, Dad! (1962), Help! (1965) and A Funny Thing Happened on the Way to the Forum (1966). The latter earned him an Academy Award for Best Music, Scoring of Music, Adaptation or Treatment.

He was also hired for Richard Lester's films Superman II and III with instructions to reuse the themes composed by John Williams from the first film and adapt them for the sequels, also adding some original work.

=== Conducting and arranging ===
Thorne also worked as a conductor, orchestral arranger and music coordinator for singer Andy Williams in the early 1970s. He also performed these same services for other composers. He orchestrated Donovan and Riz Ortolani's score for Franco Zeffirelli's Brother Sun, Sister Moon (1973). He also worked on the scores for Green Ice (1981), 3 Ninjas (1992), The King and I (1999) and U-571 (2000).

== Death ==
Thorne died at a hospital in West Hills, California, on 9 July 2014.

== Selected filmography ==
- Three on a Spree (1961)
- It's Trad, Dad! (1962)
- She Knows Y'Know (1962)
- Dead Man's Evidence (1962)
- Master Spy (1963)
- Help! (1965)
- A Funny Thing Happened on the Way to the Forum (1966)
- How I Won the War (1967)
- Inspector Clouseau (1968)
- The Touchables (1968)
- Sinful Davey (1969)
- The Bed-Sitting Room (1969)
- The Magic Christian (1969)
- A Talent for Loving (1969)
- Hannie Caulder (1971)
- Brother Sun, Sister Moon (1973)
- Juggernaut (1974)
- The Ritz (1976)
- Power Play (1978)
- Arabian Adventure (1979)
- The Outsider (1980)
- Superman II (1980)
- Wolf Lake (1980)
- The Hunchback of Notre Dame (1982)
- The House Where Evil Dwells (1982)
- Superman III (1983)
- Lassiter (1984)
- The Evil That Men Do (1984)
- Finders Keepers (1984)
- The Trouble with Spies (1987)
- Sunset Grill (1993)
- Mary, Mother of Jesus (1999)
- In the Beginning (miniseries) (2000)
- Santa Jr. (2002)

== Awards and nominations ==
- Academy Awards
  - Winner for Best Music, Scoring of Music, Adaptation or Treatment: A Funny Thing Happened on the Way to the Forum (1966)
- Academy of Science Fiction, Fantasy and Horror Films
  - Nominated for Best Music The House Where Evil Dwells (1982)
  - Nominated for Best Music Superman II (1980)
  - Nominated for Best Music Arabian Adventure (1979)
- Emmy Awards
  - Nominated for Outstanding Individual Achievement in Music and Lyrics for "For A Love Like You" from A Season of Hope (1995) [shared with Dennis Spiegel (lyricist)]
- Grammy Awards
  - Nominated for Best Original Score Written for a Motion Picture or Television Show for Help! (1965) [shared with John Lennon, Paul McCartney, George Harrison]
