= The House Where Evil Dwells =

- Theatricial release poster by John Solie
- Directed by: Kevin Connor
- Screenplay by: Robert Suhosky
- Based on: The House Where Evil Dwells by James Hardiman
- Produced by: Martin B. Cohen
- Starring: Edward Albert; Susan George; Doug McClure
- Cinematography: Jacques Haitkin
- Edited by: Barry Peters
- Music by: Ken Thorne
- Production company: Toei Company
- Distributed by: MGM/UA Entertainment
- Release date: May 14, 1982 (United States)
- Running time: 88 minutes
- Countries: United States; Japan
- Language: English
- Box office: $667,863

The House Where Evil Dwells is a 1982 supernatural horror film directed by Kevin Connor and starring Edward Albert, Susan George, and Doug McClure. It follows an American family that moves into a reputed haunted house in the hills of Kyoto, Japan, where a samurai committed a murder-suicide in 1840. It was based on a novel by James Hardiman and turned into a screenplay by Robert Suhosky.

== Plot ==
In 1840, in the rural and wooded hillside region of Kushiata near Kyoto, a samurai, named Shigero, comes home to find his wife, Otami, in bed with another man, named Masanori. In a violent scene, Shigero kills them both and then himself. Flash-forward to the present day, an American family of three, which includes writer Ted Fletcher, his wife Laura, and their 12-year-old daughter, Amy, moves into this since-abandoned house and starts to experience incidents of haunting and possession. The three dead people still haunt the house and subject each of the Fletcher family to various harassment and mischief which gets more frequent and serious with each passing day.

A Zen monk approaches Ted and tells him the story about the murders and urges him to leave the house. At the same time, Laura slowly becomes consumed by the evil presence of the three ghosts and begins an affair with Alex Curtis, a diplomat friend of Ted's who introduced them to the house. The evil presence within the haunted house, including the ghosts briefly possessing each member of the family to do odd things, reveals that the ghosts are plotting to re-enact the murder-suicide so their souls could be free from the confines of the house.

The supernatural incidents becomes more frequent when Ted is nearly drowned in a lake by Otami's ghost, and the ghosts of Shigero and Masanori take the form of giant spider crabs which attack Amy one evening and it leads her to falling from a tree when she tries to escape and is forced to be sent back to America.

At the climax, Ted calls the Zen monk, who exorcises the ghosts from the house and tells them to leave by the morning, before ghosts will return. When Laura tells Ted about her infidelity with Alex, he takes it very badly and attacks her. Alex arrives at the house, whereupon the ghosts also return to the house. They possess all three of them and finally re-enact the gory confrontation from the opening scene, leading to the deaths of Alex, Laura, and Ted. The movie ends with the three ghosts leaving the house for the afterlife, and implying that the souls of Ted, Laura and Alex now haunt the cursed house in their place.

== Cast ==
- Edward Albert as Ted Fletcher
- Susan George as Laura Fletcher
- Doug McClure as Alex Curtis
- Amy Barrett as Amy Fletcher
- Mako Hattori as Otami
- Toshiyuki Sasaki as Shigero
- Toshiya Maruyama as Masanori
- Tsuyako Okajima as Majyo Witch
- Henry Mittwer as Zen Monk
- Mayumi Umeda as Noriko
- Shuren Sakurai as Noh Mask Maker
- Hiroko Takano as Wakako
- Shôji Ohara as Assistant Mask Maker
- Jirô Shirai as Tadashi
- Kazuo Yoshida as Editor
- Kunihiko Shinjo as Assistant Editor
- Gentaro Mori as Yoshio
- Tomoko Shimizu as Aiko
- Misao Arai as Hayashi
- Chiyoko Hardiman as Mama-San
- Hideo Shimado as Policeman

== Release ==
=== Home media ===
MGM Home Entertainment released The House Where Evil Dwells on DVD in 2005. Scream Factory released the film on Blu-ray in 2016 as a double feature with Ghost Warrior (1984).

== Reception ==
=== Box office ===
The House Where Evil Dwells grossed $667,863 at the United States box office.

=== Critical response ===
The film drew mixed reviews. Vincent Canby of The New York Times wrote, "The House Where Evil Dwells... should satisfy all but the most insatiable appetites for haunted-house movies."

TV Guide said: "The film has more nudity than chills, but it does have some quirky humor, especially in the exorcism scene."

== See also ==
- List of ghost films
