= Arabian Adventure =

- Directed by: Kevin Connor
- Written by: Brian Hayles (screenplay)
- Produced by: John Dark
- Starring: Christopher Lee; Oliver Tobias
- Cinematography: Alan Hume
- Edited by: Barry Peters
- Music by: Ken Thorne
- Production companies: EMI Films; British Lion Films
- Distributed by: EMI Distributors
- Release dates: 5 July 1979; 19 July 1979 (UK)
- Running time: 98 minutes
- Country: United Kingdom
- Language: English
- Budget: $4 million

Arabian Adventure is a 1979 British fantasy adventure film directed by Kevin Connor and starring Christopher Lee and Oliver Tobias.

== Plot ==
An evil caliph offers his daughter's hand in marriage to a prince if he can complete a perilous quest for a magical rose. Helped by a young boy and a magic carpet, Prince Hasan has to overcome genies, fire breathing monsters and treacherous swamps to reach his prize and claim the hand of Princess Zuleira.

== Cast ==
- Christopher Lee as Caliph Alquazar
- Milo O'Shea as Khasim
- Oliver Tobias as Prince Hasan
- Emma Samms as Princess Zuleira
- Puneet Sira as Majeed
- Peter Cushing as Wazir Al Wuzara
- Capucine as Vahishta
- Mickey Rooney as Daad El Shur
- John Wyman as Bahloul
- John Ratzenberger as Achmed
- Shane Rimmer as Abu
- Hal Galili as Asaf
- Art Malik as Mamhoud
- Milton Reid as Jinnee
- Elisabeth Welch as Beggarwoman
- Suzanne Danielle as Eastern Dancer
- Roy Stewart as Nubian

== Production ==
The film was the last of five fantasy movies Connor and Dark made together, followingThe Land That Time Forgot, At the Earth's Core, The People That Time Forgot and Warlords of Atlantis. The first three were made by Amicus Productions, which had since wound up: the last two were made EMI Films, then run by Michael Deeley and Barry Spikings, and Columbia Pictures.

The first three films were adaptations of novels by Edgar Rice Burroughs but Warlords and Arabian Adventure were originals by Brian Hayles. John Dark and Connor asked Hayles to write an original Eastern fantasy. Arabian Adventure had the biggest budget of them all but it was the least successful at the box office. The movie was a throwback to Arabian nights films like The Thief of Bagdad.

"These Eastern tales abound with lovely excursions into pure fantasy", said John Dark. "It was a very beautiful period and a very beautiful territory. We hope to recreate, in our story, the exciting architecture and costumes, as well as some exciting special effects, like an army of flying carpets. It's an amalgam of a lot of stories, a lot of lore, magic mirrors, wicked spells, benign and evil jinnees and one or two very special ideas of our own."

Deeley and Spikings had introduced a system at EMI Films in which they would not make a film unless a US company put up half the budget. Arabian Adventure was a part of a slate of six films EMI were making that comprised Death on the Nile with Paramount, Warlords of Atlantis and Arabian Adventure with Columbia, Convoy with United Artists, The Deer Hunter with Universal, and The Driver with Twentieth Century Fox. However, in April 1978 EMI Films announced they would make Arabian Adventure as part of a series of films they wanted to produce with the newly formed Orion Pictures. It did end up being one of Orion's first films, along with the Academy Award-winning A Little Romance, Over the Edge, Promises in the Dark, Heart Beat, The Wanderers and the box office hit 10.

Filming took place in September 1978. The film was shot at Pinewood Studios, Buckinghamshire, U.K.

Christopher Lee returned to Britain for the first time in three years to take the lead role. "I couldn't resist it" said Lee. "It's a very fine screenplay by Brian, falling into the true fairy tale genre of romance and beauty combined with the kind of wickedness and violence which has sent delicious shivers down the spines of children of all nations since time immemorial."

Hayles died during filming, on October 30, 1978, shortly after having delivered his first draft of a third original film for Dark and Connor, about pirate ghosts.

== Reception ==
The Guardian called it "a modicum of fun since the flying carpets are excellent" but thought the script was poor.
