= The People That Time Forgot (novel) =

1963 novel by Edgar Rice Burroughs

- Cover art for first separate edition of The People That Time Forgot
- Author: Edgar Rice Burroughs
- Cover artist: Roy Krenkel
- Language: English
- Genre: Lost world novel
- Publisher: Ace Books
- Publication date: 1963
- Publication place: United States
- Media type: Print (Paperback)
- Pages: 124
- Preceded by: The Land That Time Forgot
- Followed by: Out of Time’s Abyss

The People That Time Forgot is a fantasy novel by American writer Edgar Rice Burroughs, the second of his Caspak trilogy. The sequence was first published in Blue Book Magazine as a three-part serial in the issues for August (vol. 27 #4), October (vol. 27 #6), and December (vol. 28 #2) 1918, with The People That Time Forgot forming the second installment. The complete trilogy was later combined for publication in book form under the title of The Land That Time Forgot (properly speaking the title of the first part) by A. C. McClurg in June 1924. Beginning with the Ace Books editions of the 1960s, the three segments have usually been issued as separate short novels.

== Plot introduction ==
The People That Time Forgot is a direct sequel to The Land That Time Forgot and continues the lost world saga begun in the earlier story. Burroughs continues the revelation of his lost world's unique biological system, only hinted at in the previous installment, in which the slow progress of evolution in the world outside is recapitulated as a matter of individual metamorphosis. This system forms a thematic element serving to unite the three otherwise rather loosely linked Caspak stories.

== Plot summary ==
The novel begins with the organization of an expedition to rescue Bowen J. Tyler, Lys La Rue, and the other castaways marooned on the large Antarctic island of Caprona, whose tropical interior, known to its inhabitants as Caspak, is home to prehistoric fauna of all eras. Tyler's recovered manuscript detailing their ordeal is delivered to his family, and the relief effort is put together by Tom Billings, secretary of the Tyler shipbuilding business. The expedition's ship, the Toreador, locates Caprona, and while the bulk of the crew attempts to scale the encircling cliffs Billings flies over them in an aircraft.

Billings' plane is attacked by flying reptiles and forced down in the interior of Caspak. He saves a native girl named Ajor from a large cat and a group of ape-men, and undertakes to accompany her back to her people, the fully human Galus, while she educates him in the language and mysteries of the island. They travel north, encountering various creatures of the Mesozoic and Cenozoic eras, as well as additional primitive subhuman races. They pass through the lands of the Neanderthal Bo-lu (club men) and the more advanced Sto-lu (hatchet men), who are easily cowed by gunfire. But in the country of the Band-lu (spear men) he is taken captive, and despairs until rescued in turn by Ajor. They resume their journey, re-encountering and befriending Tomar, a Band-lu newly become Kro-lu (bow man). Tomar and his mate So-al are the first examples Billings has actually seen of Caspakian evolutionary metamorphosis in action.

After an interlude in which Ajor's back story is related the new friends separate. Billings and Ajor enter Kro-lu territory and save Chal-az, a Kro-lu warrior, from a group of Band-lu. Visiting the Kro-lu village as his guest, they are parted again when Billings is attacked through the machinations of the chief Du-seen, who has designs on Ajor. They escape individually, making for the Galu country. Du-seen goes after Ajor with some of his warriors.

Billings catches and tames an ancestral horse, with the aid of which he rescues Ajor from Du-seen. Pursued, they resign themselves to death, but are relieved by a force consisting of Bowen Tyler, Galu warriors, and the rescue crew from the Toreador, which had successfully scaled the cliffs and entered Caspak after Billings' ill-fated airplane flight. All are reunited in the Galu village, where Tyler and Lys La Rue have been formally married by the captain of the Toreador. Billings and Ajor also desire to wed, but Ajor may not leave Caspak due to her status as cos-ata-lo – she was born a fully evolved Galu rather than attaining that form through metamorphosis, and hence is treasured by her people. Billings elects to remain in Caspak to be with her.

== Characters ==
- Tom Billings — The main hero of this story, he mounted a rescue party to find his lost friend Bowen.
- Ajor — A beautiful Galu of the north of Caprona, she becomes Billings's love interest.
- Du-seen — The main antagonist, an evil Galu who wants both Ajor and her father's throne for himself.
- Tomar — A Band-lu Chieftain who becomes a Kro-lu along with his "she" So-al.
- So-al — Female Band-lu who is Tomar's she.
- Chal-az — A Kro-lu who befriends Tom and Ajor.
- Ace — A Merychippus which Billings domesticates.

== Copyright ==
The copyright for this story has expired in the United States and, thus, now resides in the public domain there. The text is available via Project Gutenberg.

== Film, TV or theatrical adaptations ==
The novel was adapted to film in 1977 under the direction of Kevin Connor by Britain's Amicus Productions. The movie was the third and last of Amicus' Burroughs adaptations, the others being The Land That Time Forgot (1975), based on the first segment of the Caspak sequence, and At the Earth's Core (1976). All three films were distributed in the United States by American International Pictures.

Preceded by The Land That Time Forgot	Caspak series The People That Time Forgot	Succeeded by Out of Time’s Abyss
