= Barry Spikings =

British film producer (born 1939)

Barry Spikings (born 23 November 1939) is a British film producer who worked in Hollywood. Spikings is best known as a producer of the film The Deer Hunter (1978), which won five Academy Awards.

== Biography ==
Spikings was born in Boston, Lincolnshire. After leaving Boston Grammar School he joined the local newspaper, the Lincolnshire Standard, as a trainee reporter. Later he joined the Farmers' Weekly, where he won a Golden Ear Award for a fifteen-minute film that he produced and directed himself.

Spikings then moved to the entertainment world. Initially, he promoted pop music festivals and later films.

=== British Lion and EMI ===
In 1972, he became the co-owner of British Lion Films; Spikings later joined EMI when it took over British Lion. For the film, The Deer Hunter (1978), Spikings won an Academy Award for Best Picture. The film also garnered awards for several of its actors.

Filmink argued after Deeley left EMI Spikings' choice of films became more risky and less commercial, writing "Spikings deserves all the credit in the world for trying to make intelligent pictures that raised the bar for cinema. He is under-rated as a backer of classy pictures. But he felt ill-suited for his position."

In July 1979 Spikings argued "if you make a good film there is no way you won't make money."

He quit EMI in January 1983 with a year left to work on his contract.

=== Nelson Holdings ===
In 1985, Spikings formed a Canadian company, Nelson Holdings International, with British financier Richard Northcott, to purchase entertainment firms. Nelson later acquired the home video assets of Embassy Pictures from Coca-Cola and film production companies Galactic Films and the Spikings Corporation, and formed Nelson Entertainment. Nelson had the North American home video rights and all international rights to the output from the newly-formed Castle Rock Entertainment.

Spikings served as president of Nelson Entertainment through the early 1990s. Afterwards, he formed a production partnership with Eric Pleskow.

== Filmography ==
- 1975: Conduct Unbecoming (producer with Michael Deeley and Andrew Donally)
- 1976: The Man Who Fell to Earth (producer with Michael Deeley)
- 1978: Convoy (executive producer)
- 1978: The Deer Hunter (producer with Michael Deeley, Michael Cimino, and John Peverall)
  - Academy Awards 1978: Best Picture, Supporting Actor (Christopher Walken), Director (Cimino), Film Editing, and Sound.
- 1990: Texasville (producer with Peter Bogdanovich)
- 1991: Bill & Ted's Bogus Journey (executive producer)
- 1991: Picture This: The Times of Peter Bogdanovich in Archer City, Texas (producer)
- 1991: The Taking of Beverly Hills (executive producer)
- 1994: The Favor (executive producer)
- 1994: There Goes My Baby — also known as The Last Days of Paradise (executive producer)
- 1995: Beyond Rangoon (producer with John Boorman and Eric Pleskow)
- 2013: Lone Survivor (producer with Peter Berg, Sarah Aubrey, Randall Emmett, Norton Herrick, Akiva Goldsman, Mark Wahlberg, Stephen Levinson, Vitaly Grigoriants)

== Films as studio head ==
=== British Lion ===
- The Wicker Man (1973)
- Don't Look Now (1973)
- A Doll's House (1973)
- Who? (1974)
- The Internecine Project (1974)
- The Land That Time Forgot (1974)
- Conduct Unbecoming (1975)
- Ransom (1975)
- The Man Who Fell to Earth (1976)
- Nickelodeon (1976)
- At the Earth's Core (1976)

=== EMI Films ===
- Nickelodeon (December 1976)
- The Greatest (May 1977)
- The Deep (June 1977)
- Close Encounters of the Third Kind (November 1977)
- The Cheap Detective (June 1978)
- Silver Bears (1977) (Dist by C in USA)
- Sweeney 2 (1978)
- Warlords of Atlantis (1978) (Dist by C in USA)
- Convoy (1978)
- The Driver (1978)
- Death on the Nile (1978)
- The Deer Hunter (1978)
- Arabian Adventure (July 1979)
- The Crown Prince (1979)
- Can't Stop the Music (June 1980)
- The Awakening (October 1980)
- Times Square (October 1980)
- The Elephant Man (October 1980)
- The Jazz Singer (December 1980)
- The Mirror Crack'd (December 1980)
- Honky Tonk Freeway (August 1981)
- Evil Under the Sun (March 1982)
- Britannia Hospital (May 1982)
- Frances (December 1982)
- Second Thoughts (February 1983)
- Bad Boys (March 1983)
- Tender Mercies (Mar 1983)
- Strange Invaders (Sep 1983)
- Cross Creek (May 1983)
- Handgun (May 1983, produced in 1981)
