= The People That Time Forgot =

The People That Time Forgot may refer to:

- The People That Time Forgot (novel), a 1918 novel by Edgar Rice Burroughs
- The People That Time Forgot (film), a 1977 fantasy/adventure film based on the novel
- "The People That Time Forgot", an episode of Flying Blind
