= Warlords of Atlantis =

- Directed by: Kevin Connor
- Screenplay by: Brian Hayles
- Produced by: Kevin Connor; John Dark
- Starring: Doug McClure; Peter Gilmore; Shane Rimmer; Lea Brodie
- Cinematography: Alan Hume
- Edited by: Bill Blunden
- Music by: Mike Vickers
- Color process: Technicolor
- Production company: EMI Productions
- Distributed by: EMI Films Ltd
- Release dates: 5 May 1978 (UK); May 1978 (USA)
- Running time: 96 minutes
- Country: United Kingdom
- Language: English
- Budget: $2 million
- Box office: £97,321 (UK)

Warlords of Atlantis (aka Warlords of the Deep, though see below for further variant titles) is a 1978 British adventure horror science fiction film directed by Kevin Connor and starring Doug McClure, Peter Gilmore, Shane Rimmer, and Lea Brodie. The plot describes a trip to the lost world of Atlantis. The screenplay was by Brian Hayles. It was filmed in colour with monophonic sound and English language dialogue, and runs for 96 minutes. It was novelised by Paul Victor.

== Plot ==
At the beginning of the 20th century, British archaeologist Professor Aitken and his son, Charles, have hired Captain Daniels and his ship, the Texas Rose, to take them to sea. The pair plan to use a diving bell designed by engineer Greg Collinson to search for proof of the lost city of Atlantis.

On their first dive, Charles and Greg are attacked by a reptilian sea monster, which comes through the bottom of the diving bell. Greg sticks a live wire into the monster's mouth, electrocuting it. They then discover a statue made of solid gold, a sign that they have found Atlantis.

When the statue is hoisted up to Texas Rose, deckhands Grogan, Fenn and Jacko hatch a scheme to take the gold. Grogan cuts the line to the diving bell, trapping Greg and Charles at the bottom of the sea, and another of the mutineers shoots the Professor in the back. Suddenly a gigantic octopus known as the Sentinel, sent by the inhabitants of Atlantis, attacks. The ship's four crewmen are captured by the Sentinel, along with Greg and Charles in the diving bell. Only Sandy, the ship's cabin boy, and the Professor are left on Texas Rose.

The castaways are taken to a cavern beneath the ocean floor. They are greeted by Atmir, of the Atlantean ruling class, and the spear-wielding Guardians. Atmir promises to take them to safety, telling them en route that Atlantis has seven different cities, the first two of which have been sent down to the ocean, while a third one is now deserted and empty. Atmir takes the surface-dwellers through a prehistoric swamp inhabited by a millipede-like monster called the Mogdaan, before reaching the city of Vaar. There, five of the men are thrown into a dungeon, while Charles is taken to Chinqua, the royal city. As a scientist, Charles is deemed intelligent enough to be granted an audience with King Atraxon and Queen Atsil. They wish to make Charles one of them, and explain how they originally came from Mars and are using their mind powers to shape human history.

Greg and the Texas Rose crew make friends with Briggs, the captain of the long missing Mary Celeste. Briggs is the unofficial leader of the human slaves the Atlanteans' have captured, including his daughter, Delphine. Briggs informs them they will be given gills, thus will never be able to return to the oxygen-rich surface. They will then help protect Atlantis from the constant attacks of creatures known as Zaargs. A sudden Zaarg attack claims the life of Briggs, so Delphine helps Greg and the crew escape. Delphine shows the men a tunnel that will lead them into Atraxon's palace, where they can rescue Charles.

Charles is enjoying his status amongst the Atlanteans, and is intrigued when they show him the "utopia" they aim to create on Earth. When the others reach him, he refuses to leave. Greg knocks him out and they carry him away from the influence of the mind powers of the Atlanteans. Regaining consciousness, Charles's head has cleared and he chooses to escape with Greg and the others.

The group retrace the route back. When they reach the swamp, the Mogdaan kills Jacko, but the others escape. When they reach the diving bell, Admir and the Guardians are waiting. Using telekinesis, Admir causes the sea water to erupt violently to scare the group, but they group continue onwards. Delphine, whose gills mean she can never leave Atlantis, covers their escape.

The group reach the diving bell, escaping to the surface. Returning to the Texas Rose, they are met by Sandy. Holding Fenn and Grogan at gun point, Sandy tells Greg, Charles and Daniels about the mutiny and the shooting. Daniels convinces Sandy to hand over the pistols, but then turns the tables, revealing that it was he who shot the Professor, who had refused his offer to make a profit out of their discovery. Fenn and Grogan lock them up with the Professor, but as they ponder their next move, the Sentinel attacks and destroys the ship. Daniels is crushed by the statue, while everyone else escapes in the life boat.

== Cast ==
- Doug McClure as Greg Collinson
- Peter Gilmore as Charles Aitken
- Shane Rimmer as Captain Daniels
- Lea Brodie as Delphine
- Michael Gothard as Atmir
- Hal Galili as Grogan
- John Ratzenberger as Fenn
- Derry Power as Jacko
- Donald Bisset as Professor Aitken
- Ashley Knight as Sandy
- Robert Brown as Briggs
- Cyd Charisse as Atsil
- Daniel Massey as Atraxon

== Production ==
The film was the fourth action-fantasy collaboration between Kevin Connor, John Dark and Doug McClure. The first three - The Land That Time Forgot, At the Earth's Core and The People That Time Forgot - were made by Amicus Productions, which had since wound up: this movie was made EMI Films, then run by Michael Deeley and Barry Spikings, and Columbia Pictures. The budget for Warlords was higher than the previous three movies and it was the first one based on an original script, not a novel by Edgar Rice Burroughs.

Deeley and Spikings had introduced a system at EMI Films in which they would not make a film unless a US company put up half the budget. Warlords of Atlantis was a part of a slate of six films EMI were making that comprised Death on the Nile with Paramount, Warlords and Arabian Adventure with Columbia, Convoy with United Artists, The Deer Hunter with Universal, and The Driver with Twentieth Century Fox.

Peter Cushing was meant to play a lead role but he was delayed on Star Wars so Daniel Massey played his part. Kevin Connor called the script for Warlords "more intelligent" than others he had made with McClure "because that's what I’m trying to do with this film, put more comment and content into it... to make the audience aware of the folly of mankind in its broadest sense. The film is set at the time of the Industrial Revolution because I wanted to show what the scientific discoveries would eventually lead us to in terms of war and technology. The storyline is much more credible."

Filming started 5 September 1977. Location filming on Malta began on 1 October. A large amount of footage was shot on the island of Gozo. After four weeks in Malta the unit shifted to Pinewood. Filming ended 13 January 1978.

=== Title variants ===
The film was originally known as Atlantis. However it was decided to change the title to avoid confusion with Atlantis, the Lost Continent (1961). So the title became 7 Cities of Atlantis. Then the TV series The Man from Atlantis flopped and executives did not want to associate the film with that show, so it became Warlords of the Deep. However Columbia, who partly financed, thought this was too close to The Deep so the title was changed again to Warlords of Atlantis.

== Reception ==
=== Box office ===
Prior to the film's release John Dark said he was not worried about competition from Star Wars. "Any film that gets people back in the cinemas is welcome,” he said.. “If it’s in the field one is working in, so much the better. I’m not worried about it at all. It’s like saying that TV’s Man from Atlantis will affect the returns at the box office. In reality, it gets the name of Atlantis mentioned and in fact will coax more people to the cinema."

According to academic James Chapman, the film opened at the box office strongly but "fell out of the top ten after only one week, a more rapid decline than its predecessors that can probably be attributed to stiff competition during the summer of 1978, including Revenge of the Pink Panther, Close Encounters of the Third Kind and Grease."

The film was the 15th most successful movie in the UK in 1978. However it was considered a disappointment compared to the earlier films (and the movie's higher budget). John Dark, Kevin Connor and Brian Hayles did collaborate on one more film, Arabian Adventure.

=== Critics ===
Variety noted "The one not inconsiderable virtue of the script is that it keeps the pot boiling. Direction by Kevin Connor and the editing keep the eye-filling pace brisk. The clichéd characters are played in workmanlike fashion by all hands";

Sight and Sound wrote "the presence of Cyd Charisse, as a puppet-like but still comely Martian, provides some of the few moments of incidental pleasure in this dinosaur fantasy, routinely cobbled together."

Time Out wrote "As always, Connor's approach is commendably stolid, but this production lacks almost all the more pleasing elements of the earlier movies, and is sickeningly vulgar in its portrayal of Atlantis, right down to the leering emphasis on Cyd Charisse's legs"; TV Guide wrote "It's silly but harmless and won't offend anyone under 12 years of age"; and The Spinning Image noted the film was "scripted by former Doctor Who writer Brian Hayles, and has a similar strain of British idiosyncrasy about it, despite being an American co-production. Rest assured, the rubber monsters familiar from the first three films are present and correct, as is the piling on of incident and special effects, regardless of how convincing they are on screen...it's a fairly enjoyable ride with generally witty performances and plentiful action. And where else can you get to see Doug McClure beat up Cliff from Cheers?"

Academic James Chapman felt Warlords was the "most interesting" of the 1970s lost world films "perhaps because it was an original screenplay rather than an adaptation of pulp literature. The script has some pretension to seriousness in so far as it suggests an alternative history of the Earth in which the course of technological development has been determined by the survivors of the lost civilisation of Atlantis."

Filmink noted the films in the series became "beloved".

== Novelisation ==
The novelisation by Paul Victor was published in 1978, as a tie-in to the film, by Futura Publications Limited. Told entirely from the point of view of Greg Collinson, it follows the movie more or less faithfully. Notable changes, however, include the addition of a fourth crew member, Chuck, Grogan and Fenn being dragged back to Atlantis by the Sentinel instead of escaping with the others, and the attack by flying fish — which in the film occurs as the surface-dwellers are escaping across the causeway — happens much earlier during their approach to Vaar.

== See also ==
- List of underwater science fiction works
