= John Dark =

British film and television producer

- Born: 7 April 1927; London, England
- Died: 29 June 2015 (aged 88)
- Occupation: Producer

John Dark (7 April 1927 – 29 June 2015) was a British film and television producer.

Dark produced Half a Sixpence in 1967 and a series of Edgar Rice Burroughs films, including The Land That Time Forgot and At the Earth's Core, in the 1970s.

Earlier work included associate producer on the Charles K. Feldman spoofs What's New Pussycat? and Casino Royale.

Dark was also executive producer of the film adaptation of the Willy Russell play Shirley Valentine and of the ill-fated BBC soap opera set in Spain, Eldorado.

== Select filmography ==
- Rogue's Yarn (1957) - assistant director
- Sailor of Fortune (1958) - assistant director
- The Strange World of Planet X (1958) - production manager
- Missiles from Hell (1958) - production manager
- A Cry from the Streets (1958) - production manager
- Ferry to Hong Kong (1959) - production manager
- Skywatch (1960) - producer
- The Wind of Change (1961) - producer
- The Greengage Summer (1961) - production manager
- The Running Man (1963) - production manager
- Jason and the Argonauts (1963) - associate producer
- The 7th Dawn (1964) - associate producer
- What's New Pussycat? (1965) - associate producer
- Casino Royale (1967) - associate producer
- Half a Sixpence (1967) - executive producer
- There's a Girl in My Soup (1970) - executive producer
- From Beyond the Grave (1974) - producer
- Madhouse (1974) - associate producer
- The Beast Must Die (1974) - producer
- The Land That Time Forgot (1974) - producer
- At the Earth's Core (1976) - producer
- The People That Time Forgot (1977) - producer
- Warlords of the Deep (1978) - producer
- Arabian Adventure (1979) - producer
- Slayground (1983) - producer
- Shirley Valentine (1989) - executive producer
- Stepping Out (1991) - executive producer
- Eldorado (1992–93) (Tv series) - executive producer
