= The Land That Time Forgot (novel) =

Book by Edgar Rice Burroughs

The Land Time Forgot
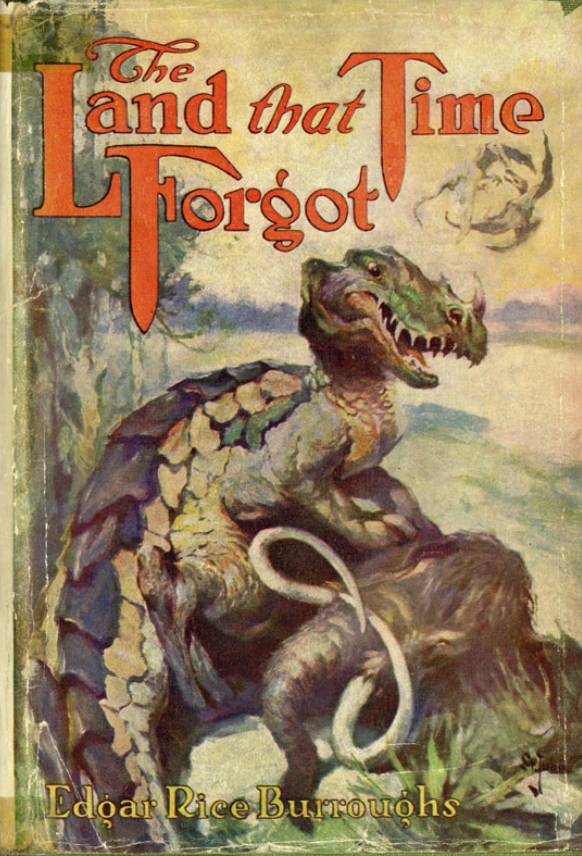
- Cover art for first combined edition of The Land That Time Forgot
- Author: Edgar Rice Burroughs
- Language: English
- Series: Caspak
- Genre: Lost world
- Publisher: A. C. McClurg
- Publication date: 1918
- Publication place: United States
- Media type: Print (Hardback)
- Pages: 422
- Followed by: The People That Time Forgot

The Land That Time Forgot is a fantasy novel by American writer Edgar Rice Burroughs, the first of his Caspak trilogy. His working title for the story was "The Lost U-Boat". The sequence was first published in Blue Book Magazine as a three-part serial in the issues for August (vol. 27 #4), October (vol. 27 #6), and December (vol. 28 #2) 1918. The complete trilogy was later combined for publication in book form under the title of the first part by A. C. McClurg in June 1924. Beginning with the Ace Books editions of the 1960s, the three segments have usually been issued as separate short novels.

== Plot introduction ==
Starting out as a harrowing wartime sea adventure, Burroughs's story ultimately develops into a lost world story reminiscent of such novels as Sir Arthur Conan Doyle's The Lost World (1912) and Jules Verne's Journey to the Center of the Earth (1864). Burroughs adds his own twist by postulating a unique biological system for his lost world, in which the slow progress of evolution in the world outside is recapitulated as a matter of individual metamorphosis. This system is only hinted at in The Land That Time Forgot; presented as a mystery whose explication is gradually worked out over the course of the next two novels, it forms a thematic element serving to unite three otherwise rather loosely linked stories.

== Plot summary ==
Cover art for first separate edition of The Land That Time Forgot by Edgar Rice Burroughs, Ace Books, 1963.

Caprona
- The Land That Time Forgot location
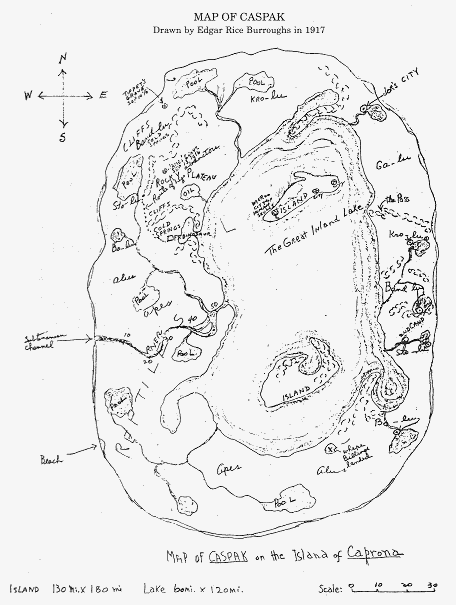
- Original map of Caprona, drawn by Burroughs (1917)
- Created by: Edgar Rice Burroughs
- Genre: Lost World

In-universe information
- Type: Fictional island
- Races: Band-Lu; Bo-Lu; Galu; Sto-Lu; Weiroo
- Characters: Bowen J. Tyler, Lys La Rue

The novel is set in World War I and opens with a framing story in which a manuscript relating the main story is recovered from a thermos off the coast of Greenland. It purports to be the narrative of Bowen J. Tyler, an American passenger sunk in the English Channel by a German U-boat, U-33, in 1916. He and a woman named Lys La Rue are rescued by a British tugboat. The tug is also sunk, but its crew manages to capture the submarine when it surfaces. Unfortunately, all other British craft continue to regard the sub as an enemy, and they are unable to bring it to port. Sabotage to the navigation equipment sends the U-33 astray into the South Pacific. The imprisoned German crew retakes the sub and begins a raiding cruise, only to be overcome again by the British. A saboteur continues to guide the sub off course, and by the time he is found out it is in Antarctic waters.

The U-33 is now low on fuel, with its provisions poisoned by the saboteur Benson. A large island ringed by cliffs is encountered, and identified as Caprona, a land mass first reported by the fictitious Italian explorer Caproni in 1721 whose location was subsequently lost. A freshwater current guides the sub to a stream issuing from a subterranean passage, which is entered on the hope of replenishing the water supply. The U-boat surfaces into a tropical river teeming with primitive creatures extinct elsewhere; attacked, it submerges again and travels upstream in search of a safe harbor. It enters a thermal inland sea, essentially a huge crater lake, whose heat sustains Caprona's tropical climate. As the sub travels north along the island's waterways the climate moderates and wildlife undergoes an apparent evolutionary progression.

On the shore of the lake the crew builds a palisaded base, dubbed Fort Dinosaur for the area's prehistoric fauna. The British and Germans agree to work together under Tyler, with Bradley, the mate from the tug, as second in command and Von Schoenvorts, the original sub commander, in control of the Germans. The castaways are attacked by a horde of beast men and take prisoner Ahm, a Neanderthal Man. They learn that the native name for the island is Caspak. Oil is discovered, which they hope to refine into fuel for the U-33. As they set up operations, Bradley undertakes various explorations. During his absence Lys disappears and the Germans abscond with the submarine.

Tyler leaves the other survivors to seek and rescue Lys. A series of adventures ensues among various bands of near-human primitives, each representing a different stage of human advancement, as represented by their weaponry. Tyler rescues Lys from a group of Sto-lu ("hatchet men"), and later aids the escape of a woman of the Band-lu (spearmen) to the Kro-lu (bowmen). Lys is lost again, and chance discoveries of the graves of two men associated with Bradley's expedition leaves Tyler in despair of that party's fate. Unable to find his way back to Fort Dinosaur, he retreats to the barrier cliffs ringing Caspak in a vain hope of attracting rescue from some passing ship. Improbably reunited with Lys, he sets up house with her, completes the account of his adventures which he has been writing, and casts it out to sea in his thermos.

== Characters ==
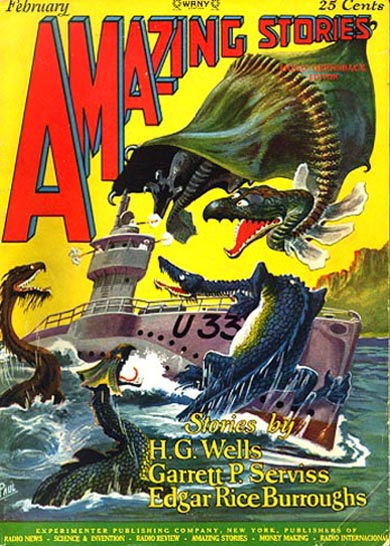
The Land That Time Forgot was serialized in Amazing Stories several years after its book publication

- Bowen Tyler: The young hero
- Lys La Rue: Bowen's love interest
- Crown Prince Nobbler: Bowen's faithful Airedale Terrier, nicknamed "Nobs".
- Baron Friedrich von Schoenvorts: The main antagonist, an Imperial German submarine commander.
- Lieutenant John Bradley: The strong ally of Bowen.
- Olson: The strong loyal Irish member of the British crew
- Ahm: The friendly Neanderthal native of Caspak
- Benson: The traitorous German agent.
- Wilson: British crew member
- Whitely: British crew member

== Reception ==
Galaxy reviewer Floyd C. Gale, discussing a 1963 reprint, described the novel as "sheer, headlong adventure that is unusual even for an ERB thriller."

== Copyright ==
The copyright for this story has expired in the United States and, thus, now resides in the public domain there. The text is available via Project Gutenberg, and as an audiobook from LibriVox.

== Adaptations ==
The novel was adapted to film in 1974 under the direction of Kevin Connor by Britain's Amicus Productions. The movie was a sleeper hit and inspired Amicus to make two more Burroughs adaptations, At the Earth's Core (1976), an adaptation of the first book in the Pellucidar series, and The People That Time Forgot (1977), a direct sequel to Land based on the second book of the Caspak series. All three films were distributed in the United States by American International Pictures.

A second film adaptation of the same name, produced by the American studio The Asylum, was released in 2009. It featured people from the present interacting with World War II troops on a mysterious, prehistoric island much like the one Burroughs created. This element appeared to be influenced by the DC Comics series "The War that Time Forgot", which began in the 1960s.

In July 2016, publisher American Mythology Productions released a comic book sequel by writer Mike Wolfer and artist Giancarlo Caracuzzo. It stars Bowen J. Tyler's great-granddaughter, who leads an expedition to find Caspak.

A third film adaptation, also from The Asylum, was released in January 2025. Starring Michael Paré, it featured a Russian attack on an Australian Navy vessel in the Bering Sea, with a gravitational anomaly marooning the crews on a time-displaced Caspak.

Preceded by None	Caspak series The Land That Time Forgot	Succeeded by The People That Time Forgot
