= Alan Hume =

English cinematographer (1924–2010)

Alan Hume B.S.C.
- Born: George Alan Hume; 16 October 1924; London, England
- Died: 13 July 2010 (aged 85); Chalfont St Giles, Buckinghamshire, England
- Occupation: Cinematographer
- Years active: 1942–1998
- Employer: Cineguild Productions (1940s)
- Known for: Carry On films Return of the Jedi (1983); Octopussy (1983); A View to a Kill (1985)
- Children: 4

Alan Hume, BSC (16 October 1924 – 13 July 2010) was an English cinematographer.

== Life and career ==
Hume arrived at Denham Film Studios in 1942, and worked for Cineguild Productions during the late 1940s. His early credits, prior to being called up to the Royal Navy and Fleet Air Arm during the Second World War, included Oliver and The First of the Few (1942). Post-war, he served as a camera operator for Great Expectations (1946), Madeleine (1950) and The End of the Affair (1955). During the 1960s, he was director of photography for the successful Carry On comedy films, beginning with 1961's Carry On Regardless; eventually, Hume alternated with Ernest Steward in the position of the series' regular director of photography.

Hume's other cinematographic work during the 1960s included the horror films Kiss of the Vampire (1962, for Hammer Films) and Dr. Terror's House of Horrors (1965, for Amicus Productions). Among his later films were Checkered Flag or Crash (1977), Eye of the Needle (1981), For Your Eyes Only (1981), Return of the Jedi (1983), Octopussy (1983), A View to a Kill (1985), Runaway Train (1985), A Fish Called Wanda (1988), Without a Clue (1988) and Shirley Valentine (1989).

== Personal life and death ==
Hume had four children, all of whom have followed him into the film industry.

One of his sons, Lindsay, died in a road traffic accident when in his late teens. His other two sons and daughter Pauline continued working in the film industry.

He died on 13 July 2010 in Chalfont St Giles, England, at age 85, and was survived by his wife and 3 children.

== Filmography ==
=== Film ===
| Year | Title | Director | Notes |
|---|---|---|---|
| 1960 | No Kidding | Gerald Thomas | |
| 1961 | Carry On Regardless | Gerald Thomas | |
| 1961 | Raising the Wind | Gerald Thomas | |
| 1961 | In the Doghouse | Darcy Conyers | |
| 1962 | Twice Round the Daffodils | Gerald Thomas | |
| 1962 | Carry on Cruising | Gerald Thomas | |
| 1962 | The Iron Maiden | Gerald Thomas | |
| 1963 | Nurse on Wheels | Gerald Thomas | |
| 1963 | Kiss of the Vampire | Don Sharp | |
| 1963 | Carry On Cabby | Gerald Thomas | |
| 1964 | This Is My Street | Sidney Hayers | |
| 1964 | Carry On Jack | Gerald Thomas | |
| 1964 | Carry On Spying | Gerald Thomas | |
| 1964 | Carry On Cleo | Gerald Thomas | |
| 1965 | Dr. Terror's House of Horrors | Freddie Francis | |
| 1965 | Three Hats for Lisa | Sidney Hayers | |
| 1965 | The Big Job | Gerald Thomas | |
| 1965 | Carry On Cowboy | Gerald Thomas | |
| 1965 | Carry On Screaming! | Gerald Thomas | |
| 1966 | Finders Keepers | Sidney Hayers | Lighting cameraman |
| 1967 | Don't Lose Your Head | Gerald Thomas | |
| 1967 | The Violent Enemy | Don Sharp | |
| 1967 | Follow That Camel | Gerald Thomas | |
| 1967 | Carry On Doctor | Gerald Thomas | |
| 1968 | The Bofors Gun | Jack Gold | |
| 1969 | Captain Nemo and the Underwater City | James Hill | |
| 1970 | The Last Grenade | Gordon Flemyng | |
| 1970 | Eyewitness | John Hough | Uncredited |
| 1970 | Perfect Friday | Peter Hall | |
| 1971 | Zeppelin | Étienne Périer | |
| 1971 | The Firechasers | Sidney Hayers | |
| 1971 | Carry On Henry | Gerald Thomas | |
| 1972 | Bless This House | Gerald Thomas | |
| 1972 | Carry On Abroad | Gerald Thomas | |
| 1972 | For the Love of Ada | Ronnie Baxter | |
| 1973 | Not Now, Darling | Ray Cooney; David Croft | Uncredited |
| 1973 | Father, Dear Father | William G. Stewart | |
| 1973 | The Legend of Hell House | John Hough | |
| 1973 | Carry On Girls | Gerald Thomas | |
| 1974 | From Beyond the Grave | Kevin Connor | |
| 1974 | The Bunny Caper | Jack Arnold | |
| 1974 | The Land That Time Forgot | Kevin Connor | |
| 1975 | Cleopatra Jones and the Casino of Gold | Charles Bail | |
| 1975 | Confessions of a Pop Performer | Norman Cohen | |
| 1976 | Trial by Combat | Kevin Connor | |
| 1976 | At the Earth's Core | Kevin Connor | |
| 1977 | Gulliver's Travels | Peter R. Hunt | |
| 1977 | Checkered Flag or Crash | Alan Gibson | |
| 1977 | The People That Time Forgot | Kevin Connor | |
| 1977 | The Amsterdam Kill | Robert Clouse | |
| 1977 | Wombling Free | Lionel Jeffries | Lighting cameraman |
| 1978 | Warlords of Atlantis | Kevin Connor | |
| 1978 | The Legacy | Richard Marquand | With Dick Bush |
| 1978 | Carry On Emmannuelle | Gerald Thomas | |
| 1979 | Arabian Adventure | Kevin Connor | |
| 1979 | Bear Island | Don Sharp | |
| 1979 | Birth of the Beatles | Richard Marquand | |
| 1980 | The Watcher in the Woods | John Hough | |
| 1981 | Caveman | Carl Gottlieb | |
| 1981 | For Your Eyes Only | John Glen | |
| 1981 | Eye of the Needle | Richard Marquand | |
| 1983 | Return of the Jedi | Richard Marquand | |
| 1983 | Octopussy | John Glen | |
| 1984 | Supergirl | Jeannot Szwarc | |
| 1985 | A View to a Kill | John Glen | |
| 1985 | Lifeforce | Tobe Hooper | |
| 1985 | Runaway Train | Andrei Konchalovsky | |
| 1987 | The Second Victory | Gerald Thomas | |
| 1987 | Hearts of Fire | Richard Marquand | |
| 1988 | A Fish Called Wanda | Charles Crichton | |
| 1988 | Without a Clue | Thom Eberhardt | |
| 1989 | Shirley Valentine | Lewis Gilbert | |
| 1991 | Eve of Destruction | Duncan Gibbins | |
| 1991 | Stepping Out | Lewis Gilbert | |
| 1992 | Just like a Woman | Christopher Monger | |
| 1992 | Carry On Columbus | Gerald Thomas | |

=== Television ===
| Year | Title | Director | Notes |
|---|---|---|---|
| 1965 | The Third Man | Robert M. Leeds | Episode "The House of Bon Bons" |
| 1965-1968 | The Avengers | | 28 episodes |
| 1968-1973 | Father, Dear Father | William G. Stewart | |
| 1970-1971 | For the Love of Ada | Ronnie Baxter | |
| 1971 | Shirley's World | Ralph Levy; Ray Austin; Leslie Norman | 7 episodes |
| 1976 | Star Maidens | Freddie Francis | Episode "Hideout" |
| 1981 | Carry On Laughing | Gerald Thomas | All 13 episodes |
| 1984-1986 | What a Carry On | Gerald Thomas | All 13 episodes |
| 1988 | Jack the Ripper | David Wickes | Miniseries |
| 1989 | Judith Krantz's Till We Meet Again | Charles Jarrott | Miniseries |
| 1992 | Covington Cross | William Dear; James Keach; Les Landon; Joe Napolitano; Herbert Wise; Peter Sasdy; Ian Toynton | 11 episodes |
| 1993 | Laugh with the Carry Ons | Gerald Thomas | All 13 episodes |
| 1993-1994 | Acapulco H.E.A.T. | Sidney Hayers; Harry Ambrose; Kevin James Dobson; Henri Safran; Michael Hofstein; Frank Morehead | All 22 episodes |
| 1994-1995 | Space Precinct | | |
| 1995 | Screen Two | Jack Gold | Episode "Return of the Native" |
| 1996 | Tales from the Crypt | Freddie Francis; James H. Spencer | Episodes "Last Respects" and "The Kidnapper" |

TV movies

| Year | Title | Director | Notes |
|---|---|---|---|
| 1970 | Mister Jerico | Sidney Hayers | |
| 1982 | The Hunchback of Notre Dame | Himself (Uncredited); Michael Tuchner | |
| 1982 | The Adventures of Little Lord Fauntleroy | Desmond Davis | |
| 1985 | John and Yoko: A Love Story | Sandor Stern | |
| 1986 | Space Police | Tony Bell | |
| 1987 | Poor Little Rich Girl: The Barbara Hutton Story | Charles Jarrott | With John Lindley |
| 1988 | The Tenth Man | Jack Gold | |
| 1990 | Secret Weapon | Ian Sharpe | |
| 1994 | The Return of the Native | Jack Gold | |
| 1995 | Annie: A Royal Adventure! | Ian Toynton | |
| 1997 | 20,000 Leagues Under the Sea | Michael Anderson | |
