= The Land That Time Forgot (2009 film) =

- Theatrical poster
- Directed by: C. Thomas Howell
- Screenplay by: Darren Dalton
- Based on: The Land That Time Forgot by Edgar Rice Burroughs
- Produced by: David Michael Latt
- Starring: C. Thomas Howell; Timothy Bottoms; Stephen Blackehart; Lindsey McKeon; Anya Benton; Patrick Gorman
- Cinematography: Mark Atkins
- Edited by: Brian Brinkman
- Music by: Chris Cano; Chris Ridenhour
- Production company: The Asylum
- Distributed by: The Asylum
- Release date: July 28, 2009
- Running time: 90 minutes
- Country: United States
- Languages: English; German
- Budget: $600,000

The Land That Time Forgot (promotionally titled Edgar Rice Burrough's The Land That Time Forgot, released in other countries as Dinosaur Island) is a 2009 science fiction film by independent American film studio The Asylum, directed by and starring C. Thomas Howell. It is an adaptation of the 1918 Edgar Rice Burroughs novel of the same name, and a remake of the 1974 film starring Doug McClure.

== Plot ==
The film takes place in the present, when two newlywed couples are enjoying a charter boat cruise through the Caribbean. Passing through a bizarre storm, they emerge off the shore of the mysterious island of Caprona.

The island, which seems to exist within a time void inside the Bermuda Triangle, is full of anachronistic inhabitants, including dinosaurs and the crew of a stranded German U-boat. The newlyweds, along with the charter boat's captain and the Germans, must battle a variety of obstacles to escape from the island and get back to their own time.

At first the plan is to rescue a woman named Karen from the Germans and then take their boat away, but their guides Jude and Conrad betray them and steal the boat, leaving them to the Germans. Eventually, the captain convinces the Germans to work together to get off the island. They are able to free the U-boat and make diesel fuel from oil on the island. Unfortunately, Frost is left behind as he can't get to the sub in time and his wife Karen joins him on the island again. The sub gets away, but it is unclear if it ever returned to civilization. Frost writes down his story and puts it in a thermos and throws it in the ocean. He and Karen have found a life on the island and Karen is pregnant.

== Cast ==
- C. Thomas Howell as Frost Michaels
- Timothy Bottoms as Captain Burroughs
- Darren Dalton as Cole Stevens
- Stephen Blackehart as Lonzo
- Lindsey McKeon as Lindsey Stevens
- Anya Benton as Karen Michaels
- Christopher Showerman as Stack
- Patrick Gorman as Conrad
- Scott Subiono as Zander
- David Stevens as Jude
- Lew Knopp as Cooper
- Christian Stoehr as Luke
- Jonathan Sanders as Oliver

== Prehistoric creatures ==
- Tyrannosaurus
- Pteranodon
- Brontosaurus (carcass only)
- Gallimimus (carcass only)

== See also ==
- List of films featuring dinosaurs
- The Land That Time Forgot - A 1975 film starring Doug McClure
- The Land That Time Forgot - The 1918 novel by Edgar Rice Burroughs.
- Princess of Mars - another film by The Asylum based on books by Edgar Rice Burroughs, released in the same year.
- War of the Worlds 2: The Next Wave - Another Asylum film starring and directed by C. Thomas Howell, who also appeared in the previous film H. G. Wells' War of the Worlds.
- The Day the Earth Stopped - another science fiction film by The Asylum starring and directed by C. Thomas Howell
