= Satan's Triangle =

1975 film by Sutton Roley

- Original network advertising.
- Genre: Drama; Horror; Mystery
- Written by: William Read Woodfield
- Directed by: Sutton Roley
- Starring: Kim Novak; Doug McClure; Alejandro Rey; Ed Lauter; Jim Davis
- Music by: Johnny Pate
- Country of origin: United States
- Original language: English

Production
- Executive producers: Paul Junger Witt; Tony Thomas
- Producers: James R. Rokos; Judith Craig Marlin; David M. Shapiro
- Production locations: Channel Islands; Miami
- Cinematography: Leonard J. South
- Editors: Bud Molin; Dennis Virkler
- Running time: 74 minutes
- Production company: Danny Thomas Productions

Original release
- Network: ABC
- Release: January 14, 1975

Satan's Triangle is a 1975 American made-for-television mystery horror film directed by Sutton Roley and produced by ABC. The plot involves a United States Coast Guard helicopter sent to answer a distress call from inside the Bermuda Triangle.

== Plot ==
USCG pilot Lt Commander Pagnolini and his winchman Haig answer an SOS call at sea and arrive at a derelict schooner, the Requite. Haig lowers himself to the ship, where he finds three dead bodies along with one survivor, Eva, cowering in the cabin.

As the pilot attempts to retrieve Haig and Eva with a rescue basket, the line breaks, plunging the two into the ocean. After they swim back to the boat, the pilot informs Haig that he must return to base because his fuel is borderline. Eva and Haig spend the night on the boat, during which time she recounts the story of the storm that killed everyone else aboard. She explains to him that the strange events began soon after they found a priest drifting in the ocean, apparently a survivor of a disaster. Then, she tells Haig of the violent storm that caused all of the freakish deaths on the boat. One man was hurled through a hatch; one is hanging from the ship's mast; another vanished before her eyes; and a fourth man is in an aft compartment, floating in the air.

Eva attributes the deaths to supernatural causes, but Haig has a practical explanation for everything, including the man who appears to be floating in the air and is actually impaled on a fish's snout. Eva is comforted and has sex with Haig. Early the next morning, the pilot returns along with the Coast Guard cutter Venturous. Haig and Eva are transferred from the Requite to the deck of the Venturous, where they board the helicopter for the flight back to Miami. At the same time, Coast Guard personnel from the Venturous investigate the wrecked schooner.

The story takes a bizarre turn when the Venturous′s captain calls Haig to tell him that what they found on the ship was not what Haig reported. The individual hanging from the mast was in fact a woman.

Eva grins evilly and turns into the priest, claims Haig and pushes him out of the helicopter to his death. The priest then turns to Pagnolini and instructs him to beg for salvation, but the pilot rejects the Devil. The priest kills him without touching him and the helicopter crashes into the sea. The priest survives and floats away as we then see Haig come back to life. He waves at a distant ship as it approaches to rescue him, but he has an evil grin on his face.

== Cast ==
- Kim Novak as Eva
- Doug McClure as Lieutenant J. Haig
- Alejandro Rey as Father Peter Martin
- Ed Lauter as Strickland
- Jim Davis as Hal Bancroft
- Michael Conrad as Lieutenant Commander Pagnolini
- Titos Vandis as Salao
- Zitto Lazann as Juano
- Peter Bourne as Swedish Captain
- Hank Stohl as Coast Guard Captain Dunnock
- Tom Dever as Miami Rescue Radio Officer
- Trent Dolan as Miami Rescue Lieutenant

== See also ==
- List of American films of 1975
