= Shane Rimmer =

Canadian actor (1929–2019)

- Rimmer in Superman III (1983)
- Born: Shane Lance Deacon; May 28, 1929; Toronto, Ontario, Canada
- Died: March 29, 2019 (aged 89); Barnet, London, England
- Occupations: Actor; screenwriter
- Years active: 1958–2019
- Television: Thunderbirds
- Spouse: Sheila Logan (m. 1963)
- Children: 3

External image
- Shane Rimmer IMDb photo

Shane Lance Deacon (May 28, 1929 – March 29, 2019), known professionally as Shane Rimmer, was a Canadian actor and screenwriter who spent the majority of his career in the United Kingdom. The self-proclaimed "Rent-A-Yank" of the British entertainment industry, he appeared in over 160 films and television programmes from 1957 until his death in 2019, usually playing supporting North American characters.

Among his best known roles were the voice of Scott Tracy in the original Thunderbirds series, Air Force Captain "Ace" Owens in Dr. Strangelove, Joe Donnelli and Malcolm Reid on Coronation Street, Edward R. Murrow in Gandhi, and Louie Watterson on the Cartoon Network series The Amazing World of Gumball. He appeared in several James Bond films, mostly notably as Commander Carter, Captain of the USS Wayne, in The Spy Who Loved Me. He made several on-stage appearances for the Royal National Theatre, and wrote scripts for Captain Scarlet and the Mysterons and Joe 90.

== Early life ==
Rimmer was born Shane Lance Deacon in Toronto, Ontario to a British mother, Vera (née Franklin), and an Irish father, Thomas Deacon, who was a journalist. He had a younger sister, Noreen. He adopted his paternal grandmother's maiden name Rimmer and began his career on Canadian radio as a singer and disc jockey before becoming a television presenter.

== Career ==
=== Film ===
Rimmer appeared mainly in supporting roles, especially in films and television series produced in the United Kingdom. He emigrated to England in 1959, after initially performing as a cabaret singer.

His appearances include roles in films such as Dr. Strangelove (1964), Rollerball (1975), The Spy Who Loved Me (1977), Gandhi (1982), Out of Africa (1985), Crusoe (1989), Spy Game (2001) and Batman Begins (2005).

During his career, Rimmer appeared uncredited in, among other films, You Only Live Twice (1967), The Dirty Dozen (1967), Diamonds Are Forever (1971), Star Wars (1977) and Superman II (1980). He also is believed to have provided the voice for the character Hamilton (played by Robert Dix) in Live and Let Die (1973).

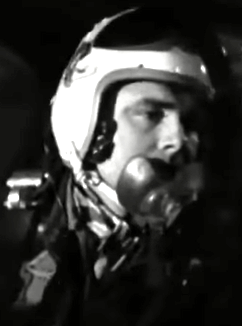
Rimmer in Dr. Strangelove (1964)

=== Television ===
Rimmer had a long-running association with TV producer Gerry Anderson, including the series Thunderbirds (1964–1966). He was the voice actor behind the character of Scott Tracy. He drafted the story for the series' penultimate episode, "Ricochet" (1966), from which writer Tony Barwick penned a script. Rimmer thought the studio rates for voices in those days were "absolutely deplorable". Years after working on Thunderbirds, Rimmer, along with fellow Anderson associate Matt Zimmerman, retained a solicitor. They informed him of the level of payment they received, and the solicitor then gained Rimmer and Zimmerman an immense raise in the residuals. He also appeared in an episode of Danger Man.

Rimmer also wrote scripts and provided uncredited voices for Anderson's subsequent Supermarionation productions Captain Scarlet and the Mysterons (1967–68), Joe 90 (1968–69) and The Secret Service (1969), appeared in episodes of the live-action series UFO (1970) and The Protectors (1972–74), provided voices for Space: 1999 (1975–77), and guest-starred in one of its episodes, "Space Brain" (1976). Later, he appeared in the un-televised 1986 pilot Space Police (which was adapted as a full TV series and renamed Space Precinct in the 1990s, though Ted Shackelford replaced Rimmer for the series) and provided the voice of the title character in Dick Spanner, P.I. (1987).

Rimmer and American actor Ed Bishop—himself an Anderson associate–would joke about how their professional paths frequently crossed, calling themselves "Rent-a-Yanks". They appeared together as United States Navy sailors in The Bedford Incident (1965) and as NASA technicians in the opening of You Only Live Twice (1967), as well as touring together on stage, including a production of Death of a Salesman in the 1990s. Rimmer and Bishop also appeared in the BBC drama-documentary Hiroshima, which was completed shortly after Bishop's death in 2005.

He was the second voice of Louie Watterson in the Cartoon Network series The Amazing World of Gumball from 2014 to 2019. The episode "The Agent" was his final role before his death in 2019.

=== Other work ===
Rimmer appeared once in Doctor Who (in the 1966 serial The Gunfighters), and twice in Coronation Street: as Joe Donnelli (from 1968 to 1970), who held Stan Ogden hostage before taking his own life, and Malcolm Reid (in 1988), the adoptive father of Audrey Roberts' son Stephen. Rimmer was the main character in 1977 ITV Mars landing hoax documentary Alternative 3. He made many guest appearances in British TV series for ITV, including Roald Dahl's Tales of the Unexpected, as well as ITC's The Persuaders! In 1980, Rimmer played Edward Condon in the BBC mini-series Oppenheimer, which was rebroadcast in the United States in 1982, and appeared in the 1984 miniseries Master of the Game, opposite Dyan Cannon.

In 1989, Rimmer was reunited with Bishop and Zimmerman during the production of a BBC Radio 4 adaptation of Sir Arthur Conan Doyle's A Study in Scarlet. In 2012, he recorded a reading of Donald Cotton's Doctor Who novelisation of The Gunfighters for release in February 2013.

In 2010, Rimmer returned to the world of Thunderbirds with a 15-minute fan film simply entitled Thunderbirds 2010. He portrays Jeff Tracy in a voiceover on Thunderbird 3's radio, towards the end of the movie, instructing Scott and Alan to take the three astronauts they rescued in the movie to an intact space station, and return to Tracy Island in anticipation of a storm in the Pacific.

Rimmer played the role of Leo Carlin in the 2013 audio drama The Mighty Carlins by award-winning Canadian playwright Collin Doyle. The recording was produced by Wireless Theatre Company.

In 2014, Rimmer released his first fiction novel Long Shot, through amazon.co.uk/com. This marked his second foray into publishing, having released his autobiography From Thunderbirds to Pterodactyls four years previously.

In 2015, he played the role of "Anderson" in the science fiction short Darkwave: Edge of the Storm; this was released for free online the following year.

== Personal life and death ==
Rimmer married Sheila Logan in 1963; the couple had three sons: Damien, Ben and Paul. Rimmer died at Barnet Hospital in London on 29 March 2019, at the age of 89.

== Selected filmography ==
- A Dangerous Age (1957) as Nancy's Father
- Flaming Frontier (1958) as Running Bear
- The Day the Sky Exploded (1958) as John McLaren (voice)
- Dr. Strangelove (1964) as Captain "Ace" Owens
- The Bedford Incident (1965) as Seaman 1st Class
- Thunderbirds Are GO (1966) as Scott Tracy (voice)
- You Only Live Twice (1967) as Hawaii Radar Operator (uncredited)
- The Dirty Dozen (1967) as American Soldier (uncredited)
- Thunderbird 6 (1968) as Scott Tracy (voice)
- The Persuaders! (1971) as Lomax
- Diamonds Are Forever (1971) as Tom (uncredited)
- Baffled! (1973) as Race Track Announcer / Commentator
- Scorpio (1973) as Cop in Hotel (uncredited)
- Live and Let Die (1973) as Hamilton (voice, uncredited)
- Take Me High (1973) (uncredited)
- S*P*Y*S (1974) as Hessler
- Rollerball (1975) as Rusty, Team Executive
- The 'Human' Factor (1975) as Carter, CIA Man
- Twilight's Last Gleaming (1977) as Colonel Alexander B. Franklin
- Nasty Habits (1977) as Officer
- Star Wars (1977) as Rebel Fighter Technician (uncredited)
- Silver Bears (1977) as American Banker
- The People That Time Forgot (1977) as Hogan
- The Spy Who Loved Me (1977) as Commander Carter (USS Wayne)
- Julia (1977) as Customs Officer (uncredited)
- Warlords of Atlantis (1978) as Captain Daniels
- The Billion Dollar Bubble (1978)
- Superman (1978) as Naval Transport Commander (uncredited)
- Hanover Street (1979) as Col. Ronald Barth
- Arabian Adventure (1979) as Abu
- Charlie Muffin (1979) as Braley
- Superman II (1980) as Controller No. 2
- The Dogs of War (1980) as Dr. Oaks
- Priest of Love (1981) as Immigration Officer
- Reds (1981) as MacAlpine
- Gandhi (1982) as Edward R. Murrow
- The Hunger (1983) as Arthur Jelinek
- Superman III (1983) as State Policeman
- The Lonely Lady (1983) as Adolph Fannon
- Gulag (1985) as Jay
- Morons from Outer Space (1985) as Redneck (Melvin)
- Reunion at Fairborough (1985) as Joe Szyluk
- The Holcroft Covenant (1985) as Lieutenant Miles
- Dreamchild (1985) as Mr. Marl
- White Nights (1985) as Ambassador Smith
- Out of Africa (1985) as Belknap
- The Last Days of Patton (1986) as Dr. Col. Lawrence Ball
- Anastasia: The Mystery of Anna (1986) as Harvey Coward
- Whoops Apocalypse (1986) as Marvin Gelber
- The Bourne Identity (1988) as Alexander Conklin
- A Very British Coup (1988) as Marcus Morgan
- Crusoe (1989) as Mr. Mather
- A Kiss Before Dying (1991) as Commissioner Malley
- Company Business (1991) as chairman, Maxine Gray Cosmetics
- Year of the Comet (1992) as T.T. Kelleher
- Piccolo Grande Amore (1993) as Mr Hughes
- A Kid in King Arthur's Court (1995) as Coach
- Space Truckers (1996) as E.J. Saggs
- One of the Hollywood Ten (2000) as Parnell Thomas
- Spy Game (2001) as Estate Agent
- The War of the Starfighters (2003) as Tantive Base Operative (voice)
- Batman Begins (2005) as Older Gotham Water Board Technician
- Mee-Shee: The Water Giant (2005) as Bob Anderson
- Alien Autopsy (2006) as Colonel
- Lovelorn (2010) as The Barman
- Dark Shadows (2012) as board member 1
- Darkwave: Edge of the Storm (2016) as Captain S. Anderson
