= Roy Holder =

English actor (1946–2021)

- Born: Roy Trevor Holder; 15 June 1946; Birmingham, Warwickshire, England, U.K.
- Died: 9 November 2021 (aged 75); Surrey, England
- Years active: 1961–2018
- Spouse: Pauline Cox
- Children: 2

Roy Trevor Holder (15 June 1946 – 9 November 2021) was an English film and television actor who appeared in various programmes including Ace of Wands, Z-Cars, Spearhead, the Doctor Who serial The Caves of Androzani. His first notable appearance on the screen was in the 1961 film Whistle Down the Wind and he then appeared in Franco Zeffirelli's The Taming of the Shrew (1967), and Here We Go Round the Mulberry Bush (1967).

== Career ==
In 1968 he played Peter in Zeffirelli's Romeo and Juliet. Appearances in The Virgin Soldiers (1969), Loot (1970), The Virgin and the Gypsy (1970), Psychomania (1973), The Land That Time Forgot (1974), and Trial by Combat (1976) followed, and he worked with Zeffirelli for a third time in the Jesus of Nazareth miniseries in 1977. He also played the recurring role of Frank Baker in the BBC TV series Sorry! from 1981 to 1988.

Holder also appeared as Mr Callard in "Precious Bane", as Mickey Lister in Coronation Street, and a photographer in Steptoe and Son. He played Nick the taxi driver in EastEnders (2000), as well as the part of Mr. Hill in Pride & Prejudice (2005) and Gaffer Tom in Robin Hood (2010).

Holder returned to film in 2011 as Fred Goddard in War Horse; and made a return to television in 2018, featuring in Dark Heart.

== Personal life ==
Holder played in several celebrity golf tournaments throughout the year for The Stage Golfing Society.

In 2016, after they had been together for more than 40 years, Holder married Pauline Cox, a BBC makeup and hair designer whom he had met when they were working on the play Brent Geese in 1975. They had two children.

Holder died from cancer, on 9 November 2021, aged 75.

== Filmography ==
Year	Title	Role	Notes
1961	Whistle Down the Wind	Jackie	
1962	Term of Trial	Thompson	
1964	Murder Ahoy!	Petty Officer Lamb	Uncredited
1965	Othello	Clown	
1967	The Taming of the Shrew	Biondello	
1967	Here We Go Round the Mulberry Bush	Arthur	
1968	Romeo and Juliet	Peter	
1969	The Virgin Soldiers	Fenwick	
1970	The Virgin and the Gypsy	Bob	
1970	Loot	Hal	
1973	Psychomania	Bertram	
1974	The Land That Time Forgot	Plesser	
1976	Trial by Combat	William Renfield	
1977	Jesus of Nazareth	Enoch	TV mini-series
1985	Out of the Darkness	Garage man	
1989	Mack the Knife	Wally the Weeper	
1995	Cynthia Payne's House of Cyn	Client	
2004	Tooth	Garbage Man	
2005	Pride & Prejudice	Mr. Hill	
2010	Robin Hood	Gaffer Tom	
2011	War Horse	Fred Goddard	
