= John Wyman (actor) =

British actor

- Born: 12 September 1944 (age 82); Clifton, Bristol, England
- Education: Actor's Workshop, London
- Occupation: Actor

John Wyman (born 12 September 1944) is an English actor who is perhaps best known for his role as Erich Kriegler in the James Bond film For Your Eyes Only (1981).

== Early life and personal ==
John Wyman was born on 12 September 1944 in Clifton, Bristol in the United Kingdom. He has blue eyes. His partner is Angela Howard, a sculptor and interior designer. He trained at the Actor's Workshop in London and began acting in theatre in 1967 with juvenile leads for the Welsh Theatre Company.

== Career ==
=== Theatre ===
Wyman played Big Panther in the London Scala Theatre's final production of Peter Pan with Alistair Sim and Wendy Craig, prior to the theatre's closure in 1969. In 1973, he played Will Scarlet in Babes in the Wood at the London Palladium, and in 1975, he starred as Professor Higgins in Pygmalion at the Curtain Theatre in London. In 1976, he played the title role in Othello, a tragedy written by William Shakespeare, at the Curtain Theatre. In 1978, he played Paul in Diary of a Rat at the Traverse Theatre in Edinburgh, and Reverend Patrick Brontë in Thunder at the Upstream Theatre in London, for which reviewer Ann Morley-Priestman said he made a "sonorous" Brontë. In 1984, Wyman played Clive in The Complaisant Lover at Vienna's English Theatre in Vienna, Austria, and in 1986, he starred as the Earl of Chester in Edmund Ironside at the Bridge Lane Theatre in London. In 1988, he played Duke in the national tour of Alan Bleasedale's musical drama about Elvis Presley, Are You Lonesome Tonight?, at the Theatre Royal in Bath. Additionally, he was the understudy to Peter Bowles in In Praise of Love at the Apollo Theatre in 1995.

=== Film and television ===
Wyman first appeared in two TV series in 1968: The Saint, a British crime television series starring Roger Moore, and The Avengers, a British espionage series; he also had roles in Morningside, Rounding the Horn and The Broken Sword. His cinematic debut was in the 1969 spy film The Chairman, based on a novel by Jay Richard Kennedy and distributed by 20th Century Fox. Wyman played a reporter in a 1972 episode of the BBC science-fiction programme Doomwatch; Sven Erikson in the BBC drama The Onedin Line (1973); Garth in Churchill's People, a historical drama; Giovanni in the drama Forget Me Not (1976); and Ercule in the science-fiction series Star Maidens (1976). He also starred in the BBC series The Venturers (1975).

In 1977, he starred as the horseman in Equus, a psychological drama directed by Sidney Lumet about a psychiatrist treating a teenager who has blinded horses in a stable, attempting to find the root of his horse worship. For his role, he appeared on the cover of the November 1977 issue of the entertainment magazine After Dark, described as "a handsome horseman on an elegant horse." That same year, he also starred in Beryl Reid. In 1978, he starred as Maisie's husband in the sex comedy Adventures of a Plumber's Mate and Telly Toledo in Revenge of the Pink Panther. For these film roles, the Bristol-based Evening Post dubbed him a "sex idol" and said that his "striking looks and rugged appearance have helped to shoot him to the front line in the movie business." The publication also announced that he was arranging a contract for his first appearance in an American film. In 1979, Wyman played Bahloul in the fantasy adventure film Arabian Adventure, and starred as Roger Grant in an episode of the BBC sitcom Rings on Their Fingers and John Newman in the series Breakdown. In 1980, he appeared in The Dick Emery Show.

Wyman's perhaps most notable role came in 1981, when he starred in the James Bond film For Your Eyes Only as Erich Kriegler, a villainous KGB Olympic champion and henchman of the main antagonist, Aristotle Kristatos. In the film, Wyman's character pursues Bond (who is played by Roger Moore) on skis down a biathlon course in the Italian Alps, then on a motorcycle with mounted machine guns before crashing. He later encounters Bond a second time; Bond shoves Kriegler out of a window and he falls to his death. That same year, he also starred in an episode of the BBC science-fiction programme Blake's 7 and the anthology series Tales of the Unexpected.

In 1982, he co-starred in the action film Tuxedo Warrior with actress Carol Royle. Shot in Zimbabwe, he played the role of Cliff, which was based very loosely on the nightclub bouncer Cliff Twemlow. In 1983, Wyman appeared in the final two episodes of the BBC drama series The Fourth Arm. In 1984, he starred in an episode of the American mystery Hart to Hart as Willie Eberhardt, a smuggler who murders someone for discovering his operation, and Captain Kowalski in Master of the Game. In 1989, he played the Earl of Warwick in the documentary series The Chef's Apprentice. In 1991, he starred as Captain Donner in the science-fiction film Firestar: First Contact.

=== Advertising ===
Wyman has also appeared in several television advertisements. In the 1970s, he played a character called "The Mighty Ajax" in a series of UK television commercials for Ajax cleaning products. The character would appear in a dirty kitchen and with a powerful slash of his arm, he would clean it to a sparkle. He also starred in adverts as the Duellist for Sparkasse bank in Hamburg; the Adventurer in Ghibli After Shave, made in Italy, for Atkinsons of London; and the Gunslinger in advertisements for Hollywood, a brand of cigarettes manufactured by Souza Cruz (a subsidiary of British American Tobacco).

== Credits ==
=== Filmography ===
| Year | Title | Role |
|---|---|---|
| 1969 | The Chairman | Icon |
| 1977 | Equus | Horseman |
| 1978 | Adventures of a Plumber's Mate | Maisie's Husband |
| 1978 | Revenge of the Pink Panther | Telly Toledo |
| 1979 | Arabian Adventure | Bahloul |
| 1981 | For Your Eyes Only | Erich Kriegler |
| 1982 | Tuxedo Warrior | Cliff |
| 1991 | Firestar: First Contact | Captain Donnor |

=== Television ===
| Year | Title | Role |
|---|---|---|
| 1968 | The Saint | Jeff |
| 1968 | The Avengers | Carter |
| 1970 | Morningside | The Stranger |
| 1972 | Rounding the Horn | Billy |
| 1972 | The Broken Sword | Rolf |
| 1972 | Doomwatch | Reporter |
| 1973 | The Onedin Line | Sven Erikson |
| 1975 | The Venturers | Jimmy |
| 1975 | Churchill's People | Garth |
| 1976 | Forget Me Not | Giovanni |
| 1976 | Star Maidens | Ercule |
| 1977 | Beryl Reid | Jenkins |
| 1979 | Rings on Their Fingers | Roger Grant |
| 1979 | Breakdown | John Newman |
| 1980 | The Dick Emery Show | Horst |
| 1981 | Blake's 7 | Cancer |
| 1981 | Tales of the Unexpected | Denzil |
| 1983 | The Fourth Arm | Kommandant |
| 1984 | Hart to Hart | Willie Eberhardt |
| 1984 | Master of the Game | Captain Kowalski |
| 1989 | The Chef's Apprentice | Earl of Warwick |

=== Theatre ===
| Year | Title | Role | Venue |
|---|---|---|---|
| 1969 | Peter Pan | Big Panther | Scala Theatre |
| 1973 | Babes in the Wood | Will Scarlet | London Palladium |
| 1975 | Pygmalion | Professor Higgins | Curtain Theatre |
| 1976 | Othello | Othello | Curtain Theatre |
| 1978 | Diary of a Rat | Paul | Traverse Theatre |
| 1978 | Thunder | Reverend Patrick Brontë | Upstream Theatre |
| 1984 | The Complaisant Lover | Clive | Vienna's English Theatre |
| 1986 | Edmund Ironside | Earl of Chester | Bridge Lane Theatre |
| 1988 | Are You Lonesome Tonight? | Duke | Theatre Royal |
