= Trial by Combat =

1976 British film by Kevin Connor

- Theatrical poster
- Directed by: Kevin Connor
- Written by: Julian Bond; Steven Rossen; Mitchell Smith
- Produced by: Paul Heller; Fred Weintraub
- Starring: John Mills; Donald Pleasence; Barbara Hershey; David Birney; Margaret Leighton; Peter Cushing; Brian Glover; John Savident
- Cinematography: Alan Hume
- Edited by: Willy Kemplen
- Music by: Frank Cordell
- Production company: Combat
- Distributed by: Gamma III (USA); Columbia-Warners (UK)
- Release date: September 1976 (US)
- Running time: 88 minutes
- Country: United Kingdom
- Language: English

Trial by Combat (US title: Dirty Knights' Work) is a 1976 British action adventure comedy film directed by Kevin Connor and starring John Mills and Donald Pleasence.

The film was also known as A Choice of Weapons.

== Plot ==
A British organisation known as the Knights of Avalon is discontent that so many criminals can evade the law. So they decide to secretly hunt down these criminals, and battle and execute them with medieval weapons.

One day the founder of the organisation, Sir Edward Gifford, witnesses their actions, and they execute him too. His son, Sir John Gifford, decides to investigate his father's murder.

== Cast ==
- John Mills as Colonel Bertie Cook
- Donald Pleasence as Sir Giles Marley
- Barbara Hershey as Marion Evans
- David Birney as Sir John Gifford
- Margaret Leighton as Ma Gore
- Peter Cushing as Sir Edward Gifford
- Brian Glover as Sidney Gore
- John Savident as Police Commissioner Oliver Griggs
- John Hallam as Sir Roger
- Keith Buckley as Herald
- Neil McCarthy as Ben Willoughby
- Thomas Heathcote as Tramp
- Bernard Hill as 'Blind' Freddie
- Diane Langton as Ruby
- Roy Holder as William Renfield

== Production ==
Filming took place over ten weeks from October 1975. Finance came from Warner Bros. Connor said the two American producers, Paul Heller and Fred Weintraub "were great, they left me alone to do the film. I may have gotten a few nudges to shoot faster, but by and large they didn't interfere with anything once we got the script. They didn't insist on more closeups or similar stuff you get with some producers. Again, I was very lucky to have good producers to give me the people I wanted and let me realize my vision."

== Reception ==
The Boston Globe wrote "the scenes with Glover and Miss Leighton are about all this film has to offer."

The Miami Herald called it "predictably awful." The Guardian called it an "unspeakably inept farrago."
