= The Birdmen =

- Screenplay by: David Kidd
- Directed by: Philip Leacock
- Starring: Doug McClure
- Narrated by: Charles Aidman
- Music by: David Rose
- Country of origin: United States
- Original language: English

Production
- Producers: Harve Bennett; Harry Tatelman
- Cinematography: Jack A. Marta
- Editors: Robert F. Shugrue; Gene Palmer
- Running time: 74 min.
- Production company: Universal Pictures

Original release
- Network: ABC
- Release: September 18, 1971

The Birdmen, also known as Escape of the Birdmen and Colditz: Escape of the Birdmen, is a 1971 television film directed by Philip Leacock and starring Doug McClure and René Auberjonois. It was a fictionalized account based on a proposed scheme for prisoners of war to escape from Colditz Castle by a clandestinely constructed glider christened the Colditz Cock. The film appeared on the ABC Movie of the Week on September 18, 1971. The film was shot at Universal Studios Hollywood and released theatrically in several countries.

== Plot ==
O.S.S. agent Major Cook is to extract Halden Brevik, a Norwegian scientist with knowledge about the atomic bomb, from occupied Europe. The Germans capture them and believe their cover story: Allied air force POW escapees. They are sent to the "escape-proof" Beckstadt Castle. Cook plots escape, while keeping the scientist's true identity from the Germans and the other POWs.

Cook comes up with an escape plan to fly out of the castle to nearby Switzerland. A two-seater glider is secretly built in an attic. The Germans close in, Cook has to reveal Brevik's true identity and importance to the other prisoners in order that Brevik be one of the escapees. The other P.O.W.'s suspect Cook of lying to them, but fortunately one of them turns out to be a commando who had been captured (and also blinded) during the failed attempt to extract Brevik from Norway; he confirms Brevik's identity. Cook gets injured and cannot fly the glider, so he gives up his seat to Colonel Crawford, his strongest doubter, with whom hitherto he has had a strained relationship. The prisoners knock out a wall and, with Crawford piloting, successfully launch the glider.

== Cast ==
- Doug McClure as Major Harry Cook
- René Auberjonois as Halden Brevik / Olav Volda
- Richard Basehart as Kommandant Schiller
- Max Baer Jr. as Tanker
- Chuck Connors as Colonel Morgan Crawford
- Don Knight as Major Tovar
- Greg Mullavey as Sparrow
- Paul Koslo as Davies
- Barry Brown as Donnelly
- Tom Skerritt as Orville Fitzgerald

== Soundtrack ==
- "Die Gedanken sind frei"
