= Marco Polo (2007 film) =

- Film poster
- Written by: Ron Hutchinson
- Directed by: Kevin Connor
- Starring: Ian Somerhalder; BD Wong; Brian Dennehy
- Theme music composer: Ken Thorne
- Country of origin: United States
- Original language: English

Production
- Producers: Robert Halmi Sr. Michael O'Connor; Shan Tam
- Cinematography: Thomas Burstyn
- Editor: Barry Peters
- Running time: 131 minutes

Original release
- Release: June 2, 2007

Marco Polo is a 2007 American made-for-television historical adventure film directed by Kevin Connor, starring Ian Somerhalder, BD Wong and Brian Dennehy. In the 13th century, imprisoned in Genoa, Marco Polo, a Venetian trader, recounts his days as a young man in China to a fellow prisoner who is dying. He reminisces about his fantastic adventures, his rise to governorship in Kublai Khan's court in Mongolia, his love for a kidnapped concubine and his escape back to Italy as a wealthy man.

== Cast ==
- Ian Somerhalder as Marco Polo
- BD Wong as Pedro
- Desiree Ann Siahaan as Temulun / Kensai
- Brian Dennehy as Kublai Khan
- Lim Kay Tong as Lord Chenchu
- Christian Lee as Cogatai
- Yan Luo as Chabi
- Michael Chow as Chi
- Mark Jax as Niccolo Polo
- Alan Shearman as Maffeo Polo
- Michael O'Hagan as Old Marco Polo
- Ramin Razaghi Sefati as Persian Physician (credited as Rumin Razagh)
- Jiaolong Sun as Chonggu (credited as Sun Jiao Long)
- Zi Ge Fang as Achmath (credited as Fang Ge)
- Rodger Bumpass as Rustigielo
- Baljinnyamyn Amarsaikhan as Arig
