= Out of Time's Abyss =

1918 novel by Edgar Rice Burroughs

Out of Time’s Abyss
- Cover art for first separate edition of Out of Time’s Abyss
- Author: Edgar Rice Burroughs
- Cover artist: Roy Krenkel
- Language: English
- Genre: Lost world novel
- Publisher: Ace Books
- Publication date: 1963
- Publication place: United States
- Media type: Print (Paperback)
- Pages: 125
- Preceded by: The People That Time Forgot

Out of Time's Abyss is a science fantasy novel by American writer Edgar Rice Burroughs, the third of his Caspak trilogy. The sequence was first published in Blue Book Magazine as a three-part serial in the issues for August (vol. 27 #4), October (vol. 27 #6), and December (vol. 28 #2) 1918, with Out of Time's Abyss forming the third installment. The complete trilogy was later combined for publication in book form under the title of The Land That Time Forgot (the title of the first part) by A. C. McClurg in June 1924. Beginning with the Ace Books editions of the 1960s, the three segments have usually been issued as separate short novels.

== Plot introduction ==
Out of Time's Abyss is a direct sequel to The Land That Time Forgot and The People That Time Forgot, continuing the lost world saga begun in the earlier stories. It connects the previous two installments, bringing in characters introduced in each. Burroughs completes the revelation of his lost world's unique biological system, only hinted at in the previous installment, in which the slow progress of evolution in the world outside is recapitulated as a matter of individual metamorphosis. This system forms a thematic element serving to unite the three otherwise rather loosely linked Caspak stories.

== Plot summary ==
The book begins with Bradley, who had left Fort Dinosaur on an expedition in the first novel and never returned. Bradley and his party are attempting to return to Fort Dinosaur. Along the way, they encounter a creature which appears to be a flying dead man. Some of the members of the party consider it to be a ghost or banshee. Tippet is convinced that he is soon to die, and the next day he is killed by a Tyrannosaurus. The ghost-like creature is seen again, and James is killed by a Smilodon. Bradley disappears during the night, and the remaining members of the party make it safely to Fort Dinosaur.

Bradley had been captured by the ghost-like creature, which is soon revealed to be a naturally winged human being, belonging to a subgroup of humanity known as the Wieroo. The Wieroo takes Bradley to the island of Oo-oh, set in Caspak's inland sea. It attempts to keep Bradley in a prison, but he escapes through a secret passage. He meets Co-Tan, a girl of the highest human race of mainland Caspak, the Galu, fully human and of a Neolithic cultural level. They enter the chamber of the Wieroo king, a huge member of the race, and Bradley kills the creature with its own sword.

Co-Tan and Bradley escape the city of the Wieroo and live for several months on the forested coast of Oo-oh. Finally, though, they are discovered by Wieroo. They succeed in capturing two of the Wieroo and forcing them to fly to the mainland, one bearing each of the humans.

On the Caspakian mainland, Co-Tan and Bradley begin the trek to Fort Dinosaur, only to find the U33 under the command of its German crew from the first book. It is revealed that in his haste to escape Caspak and leave the Allies, Capt. Von Schoenvorts has miscalculated the resources necessary for their journey home, forcing the German crew to sail back to Caprona to replenish, and in the process capturing the rest of Bradley's men. Bradley and Co-Tan confront the Germans, leading to the death of Von Schoenvorts, at the hands of one of his own crewmembers. With their captain dead, the rest of the German crew chose not to fight the Allies. Together, the survivors search for Bowen Tyler and Lys La Rue, who were lost in the jungles in the first book. Instead, they find a Galu village where they meet Tom Billings, and his love, Ajor. After some discussion, Billings and Ajor decide to accompany the Uboat crew on their escape from Caspak. Once the Uboat escaped via the cave river, the survivors meet the party from the outside world from the previous book, and they return home to America, where Bradley will marry Co-Tan.

== Copyright ==
The copyright for this story has expired in the United States and, thus, now resides in the public domain there. The text is available via Project Gutenberg.

Preceded by The People That Time Forgot	Caspak series Out of Time’s Abyss	Succeeded by None
