= Loot (1970 film) =

British comedy by Silvio Narizzano

- Film poster
- Directed by: Silvio Narizzano
- Screenplay by: Ray Galton; Alan Simpson
- Based on: Loot by Joe Orton
- Produced by: Arthur Lewis
- Starring: Richard Attenborough; Lee Remick; Hywel Bennett; Milo O'Shea; Roy Holder
- Cinematography: Austin Dempster
- Edited by: Martin Charles
- Music by: Keith Mansfield; Richard Willing-Denton
- Production company: Performing Arts
- Distributed by: British Lion Film Corporation
- Release date: 31 December 1970
- Running time: 101 minutes
- Country: United Kingdom
- Language: English

Loot is a 1970 British comedy film directed by Silvio Narizzano starring Richard Attenborough, Lee Remick, Hywel Bennett, Milo O'Shea and Roy Holder. The screenplay was by Ray Galton and Alan Simpson based on the 1965 play Loot by Joe Orton. It was entered into the 1971 Cannes Film Festival.

== Plot ==
The setting is a seaside hotel owned by a Mr McLeavy in the 1960s in England. The owner's son, Hal, and Hal's boyfriend, Dennis, rob a bank located next to the funeral parlour where Dennis works. They hide the money in the coffin of Hal's mother, who has just died and whose body has been returned to the hotel prior to its final burial.

Inspector Truscott investigates the bank robbery and immediately suspects Hal and Dennis. Meanwhile, Mr McLeavy is being aggressively courted by Fay McMahon, the nurse who cared for Hal's ailing mother in her last weeks of life. Fay is having an affair with Dennis, but she has no real interest in him until he tells her he has come into money. Inspector Truscott also has a particular interest in Nurse McMahon, he is sure she murdered several of her former husbands, and also thinks she poisoned Hal's mother.

Truscott's investigations, and Dennis and Hal's ongoing measures to get away with the proceeds of the bank robbery, make up the action in Loot.

== Cast ==
- Richard Attenborough as Inspector Truscott
- Lee Remick as Nurse Fay McMahon
- Hywel Bennett as Dennis
- Milo O'Shea as Mr McLeavy
- Roy Holder as Hal
- Dick Emery as Mr Bateman
- Joe Lynch as Father O'Shaughnessy
- John Cater as Meadows
- Aubrey Woods as undertaker
- Enid Lowe as WVA leader
- Harold Innocent as bank manager
- Kevin Brennan as vicar
- Andonia Katsaros as policewoman
- Jean Marlow as Mrs McLeavy
- Robert Raglan as doctor
- Hal Galili as pallbearer
- Douglas Ridley as pallbearer
- Stephen Yardley as pallbearer
- Edwin Finn as pallbearer

== Production ==
The film was approved by Sidney Gilliat who was on the board of British Lion. He later admitted this was a mistake as the film lost a lot of money.

== Critical reception ==
The Monthly Film Bulletin wrote: "Opening out Joe Orton's comedy, [Narizzano] succeeds admirably in preserving its black tone. The Galton–Simpson script lacks some of Orton's verbal finesse and drops a couple of his more outrageous lines, but it invents incidents ... in Orton's spirit and provides a good general foundation for the cast. ... But the real triumph of the film is visual. It must have been planned with considerable care. The frame often contains as many colours as in Chabrol's A Double Tour [1959], but here they are deliberately rendered by Austin Dempster in the garishness of a biscuit tin, with nauseating clashes between orange, mauve, lemon-yellow and mismatching tones of green. ...The detachment of the audience is complete, underlined by a Brechtian use of narrational songs which recap the action at significant points. ... All in all, though, Loot is remarkably successful, both as an adaptation of the play and as a piece of film-making in its own right."

Rich. of Variety said that the film had "transferred uneasily to the screen, the opening-out in the script ... having robbed the yarn of much of its comic tension. Nevertheless, though it may offend some on the grounds of 'bad taste,' it has enough speed, inventiveness and sharp, acid, irreverent comedy to satisfy many."

In The Daily Telegraph in 2017, Tim Robey wrote "it retains something of the spirit of 1960s caper movies, such as Gambit (1966) and The Italian Job (1969). The queer sensibility of the play – censored for blasphemy and gay references in its time – is tentatively rather than fully explored – Georgy Girl director Silvio Narizzano opted to play it all for broad, primary-coloured farce."

The Radio Times Guide to Films gave the film 4/5 stars, writing: "It's a ruthless satire on authoritarianism as well as a send-up of the Agatha Christie-style whodunnit that had kept the British theatre ticking over for decades. The play had gone from disaster to prize-winning success but the film version flopped badly. Reworked by TV writers Ray Galton and Alan Simpson, it's wholly faithful to Orton's surreal sense of humour and the extreme tackiness of the characters, especially Richard Attenborough who clearly delights in playing the creepiest, kinkiest detective you'll ever see."

British film critic Leslie Halliwell said: "Breakneck black farce which still can't move quite fast enough to cover up its bad taste, though well done by all concerned."

According to the screenwriters Ray Galton and Alan Simpson, in 2012 Orton's agent Peggy Ramsay was complimentary: "... even she couldn't tell where he'd finished and where we started. But it's not a great film, unfortunately". Part of this was because, to the writers' regret, Narizzano directed the actors to perform "in an over-the-top style, and it doesn't work".
