= Doug McClure =

American actor (1935–1995)

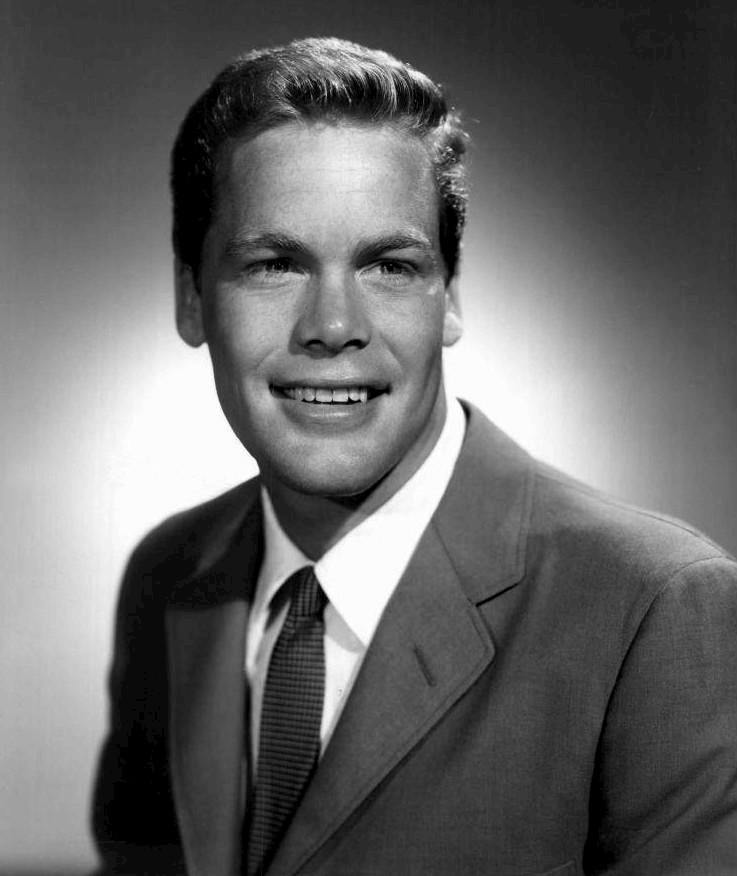
- McClure c. 1961
- Born: Douglas Osborne McClure; May 11, 1935; Glendale, California, U.S.
- Died: February 5, 1995 (aged 59); Sherman Oaks, California, U.S.
- Education: UCLA
- Occupation: Actor
- Years active: 1956–1995

Douglas Osborne McClure (May 11, 1935 – February 5, 1995) was an American actor whose career in film and television extended from the 1950s to the 1990s. He is best known for his role as the cowboy Trampas during the entire run from 1962 to 1971 of the series The Virginian and mayor turned police chief Kyle Applegate on Out of This World. From 1961 to 1963, he was married to actress BarBara Luna.

== Background ==
McClure was born in Glendale, California. His English mother, Clara Elsie (née Barker), had moved to the United States in 1915 with her widowed mother, who married an American, Frank S Artman. Clara Barker was naturalized as an American citizen in 1918, and married Irish-American Donald Reed McClure in 1929. Donald and Clara were parents to Donald Reed McClure Jr. and then Doug. The widowed Clara married former mayor of Beverly Hills Frank Clapp in 1971.

== Career ==
McClure's acting career included such films as Gidget (1959), The Enemy Below, The Unforgiven, and Because They're Young, then he landed the role of Trampas on The Virginian, a role that would make him famous. He also starred:

- As different characters in several episodes in 1957 of Death Valley Days
- As Flip Flippen in the 1960 television western series Overland Trail, in which he co-starred with William Bendix for 17 episodes
- As Jed Sills in the 1960-1962 CBS television series Checkmate for 70 episodes.
- As C.R. (Christopher Robin) Grover in the sci-fi/detective series Search (1972–1973), in which he rotated the lead with Hugh O'Brian and Anthony Franciosa as a high-tech probe agent.
- As Cash Conover, casino owner, co-starring with William Shatner, in the one-season series The Barbary Coast (1975–1976). McClure replaced Dennis Cole, who played the role of Conover in the show's pilot.
- As Mayor Kyle Applegate on the fantasy sitcom Out of This World (1987–1991).

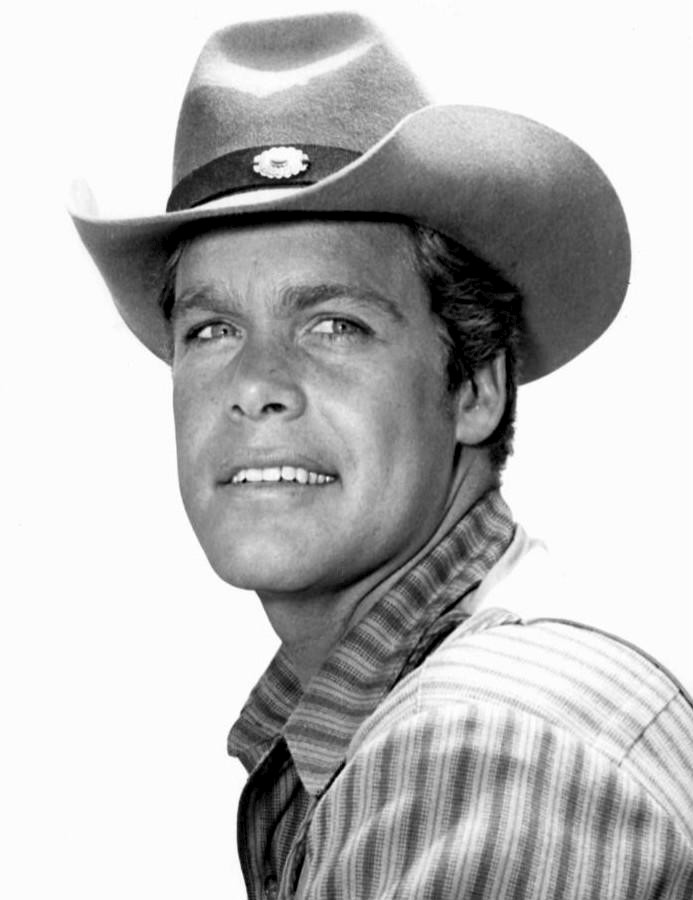
McClure as Trampas in NBC's The Virginian

McClure was in the third episode "Mr. Denton on Doomsday" of CBS's The Twilight Zone.

In 1962, he was cast as Trampas on NBC's The Virginian. His co-stars throughout the series were James Drury, Roberta Shore, Lee J. Cobb, Randy Boone, Gary Clarke, Clu Gulager, Diane Roter, Charles Bickford, Sara Lane, Tim Matheson, Jeanette Nolan, and John McIntire.

In 1965, he appeared in Shenandoah, a movie directed by Andrew V. McLaglen and starring James Stewart, Glenn Corbett, Patrick Wayne, Katharine Ross, and Rosemary Forsyth.

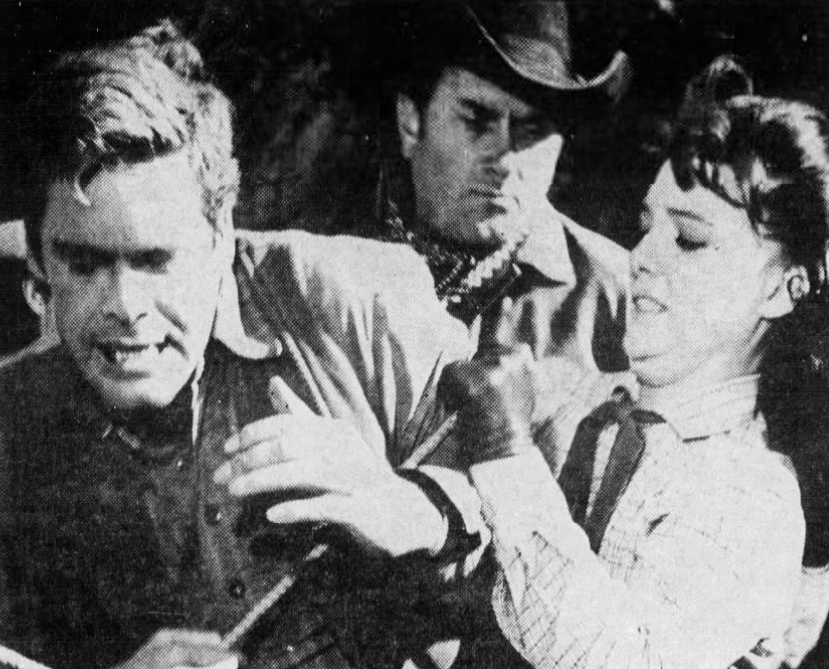
McClure (left) with Rod McGaughy and Marilyn Wayne in The Virginian, 1965

After The Virginian ended in 1971, McClure was slated to co-star with Bette Davis on a series about a parolee assisting a judge, played by Davis, by doing detective work. The pilot, produced and written by the team of Richard Levinson and William Link, failed to generate interest in the series and was released as a TV movie titled The Judge and Jake Wyler. McClure made another attempt at a television series during the 1972–1973 season by co-starring on SEARCH as a hi-tech investigator, rotating with Anthony Franciosa and Hugh O'Brian, and again in 1975–1976 in The Barbary Coast, co-starring William Shatner (with whom he'd starred in The Virginian episode "The Claim"). He shifted to low-budget science-fiction movies such as The Land That Time Forgot, At the Earth's Core and The People That Time Forgot, all three based on the novels of Edgar Rice Burroughs. In 1967, he played the Errol Flynn role in a remake of Against All Flags titled The King's Pirate. He was cast in the lead in three adventures: The Longest Hundred Miles, The Birdmen, and State of Division (also known as Death Race). In 1978, he also starred in Warlords of Atlantis. In the 1970s and 1980s, McClure appeared in commercials for Hamms Beer. McClure also appeared as the blond slave to Jamie Farr's character in the sequel Cannonball Run II (1984).

He also had a cameo role as a poker player in the 1994 remake of Maverick.

In 1994, McClure was awarded a star on the Hollywood Walk of Fame for television at 7065 Hollywood Blvd. It was unveiled in what was his final public appearance.

== Death ==
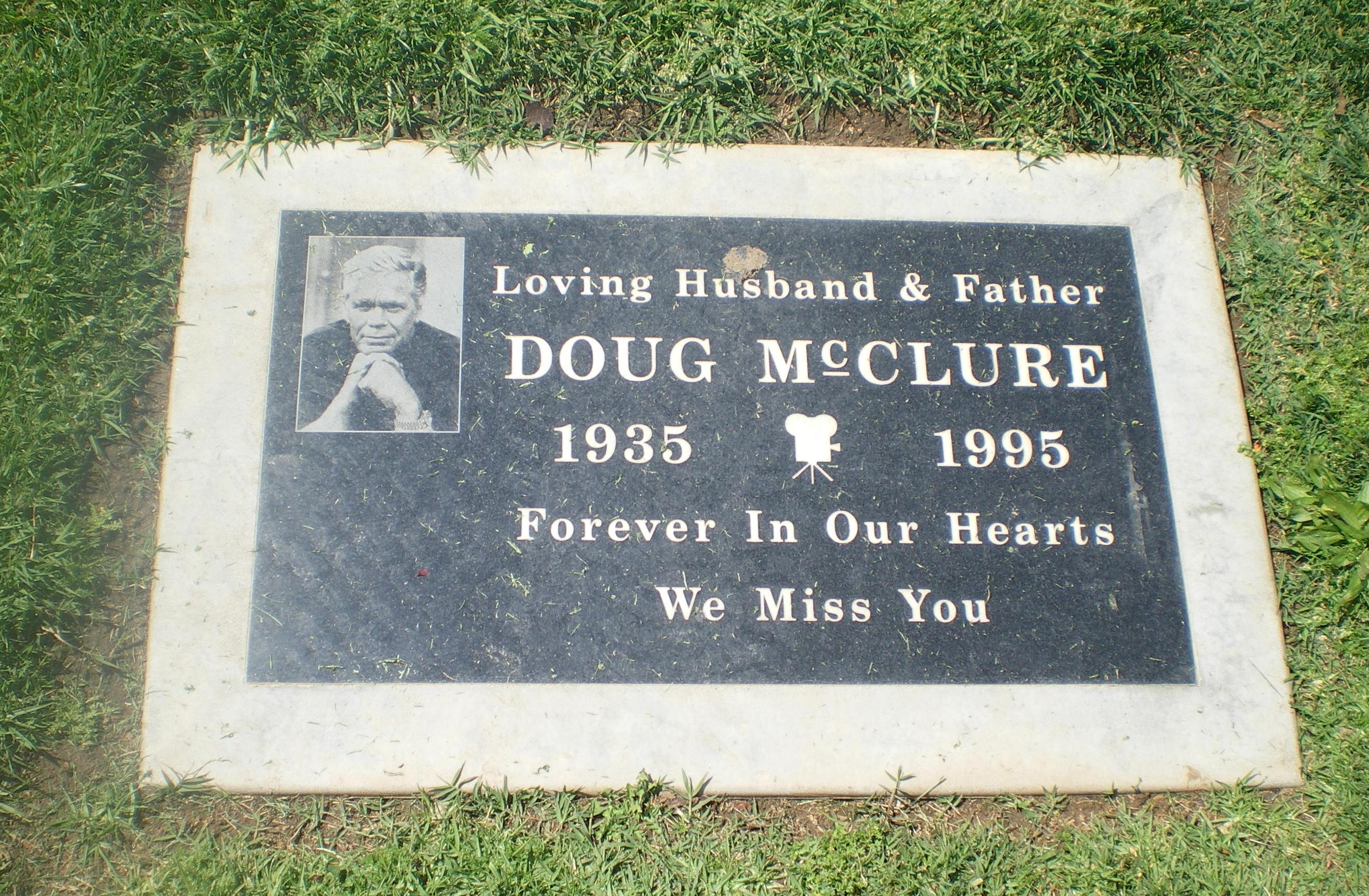
Doug McClure's gravestone

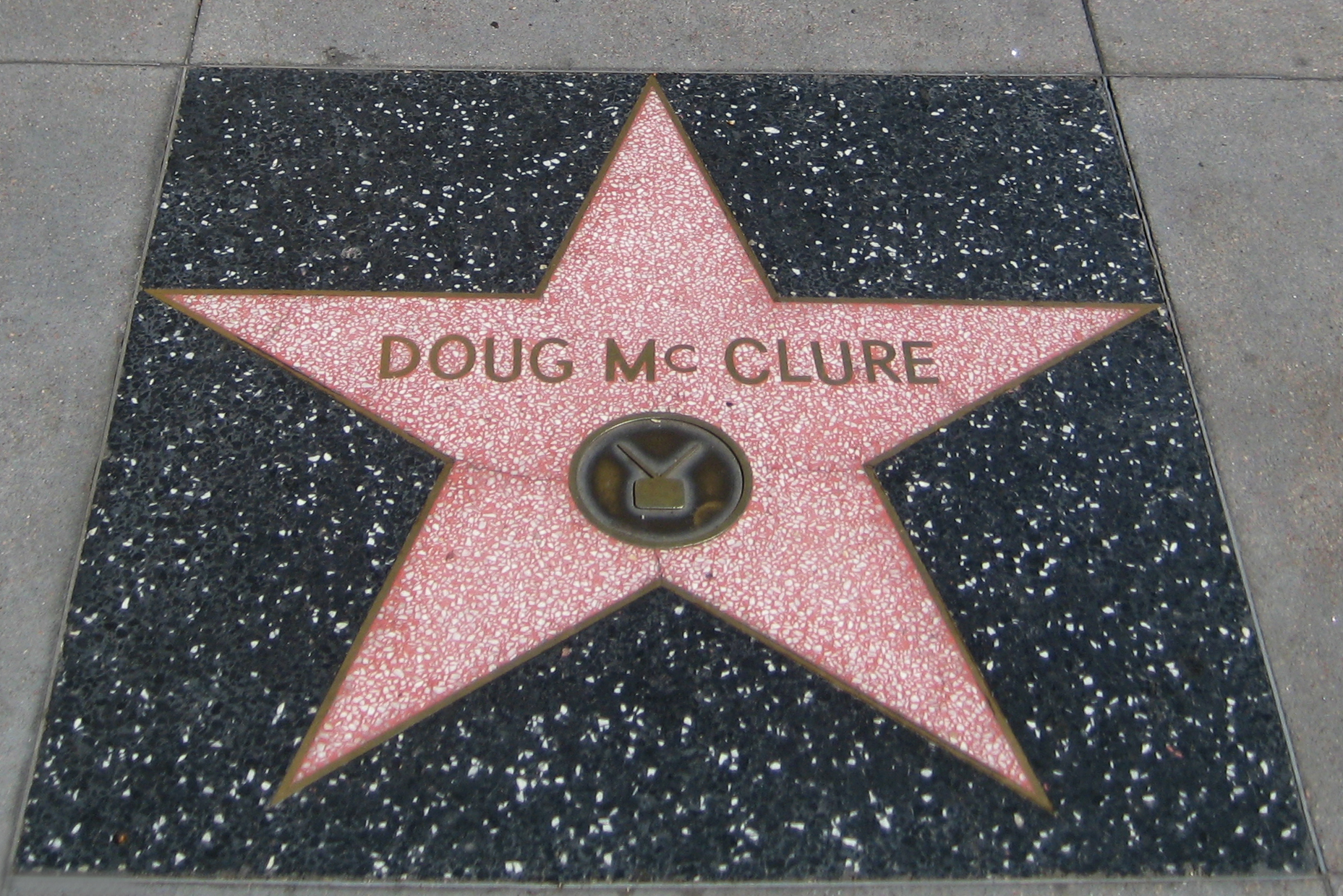
Doug McClure's star on the Hollywood Walk of Fame

On February 5, 1995, McClure died at age 59 from lung cancer in Sherman Oaks, California. On January 8 of that year, the actor was working on an episode of the television series One West Waikiki in Hawaii when he collapsed from an apparent stroke on the set. He was flown to Los Angeles for hospitalization. Doctors discovered that the lung cancer which McClure had for more than a year had spread to his liver and bones. McClure was married to his fifth wife at the time of his death. He was divorced four times, including twice while he was performing on The Virginian.

== In popular culture ==
Doug McClure and Troy Donahue served as inspiration for the name and certain character aspects of the character of Troy McClure on The Simpsons. Mike Reiss, executive producer of The Simpsons, said that McClure's daughter informed him that he was a big fan of The Simpsons. She said that, while watching an episode, McClure saw the character on the show and said, "Are they making fun of me?" McClure said that he thought that the parody was funny, and his daughters would call him "Troy McClure" behind his back as a joke.

McClure also inspired a short-running gag in the British science fiction comedy series Red Dwarf in which he is referenced several times as being an example of a terrible style of film, which the main character Lister clearly loathes.

== Filmography ==
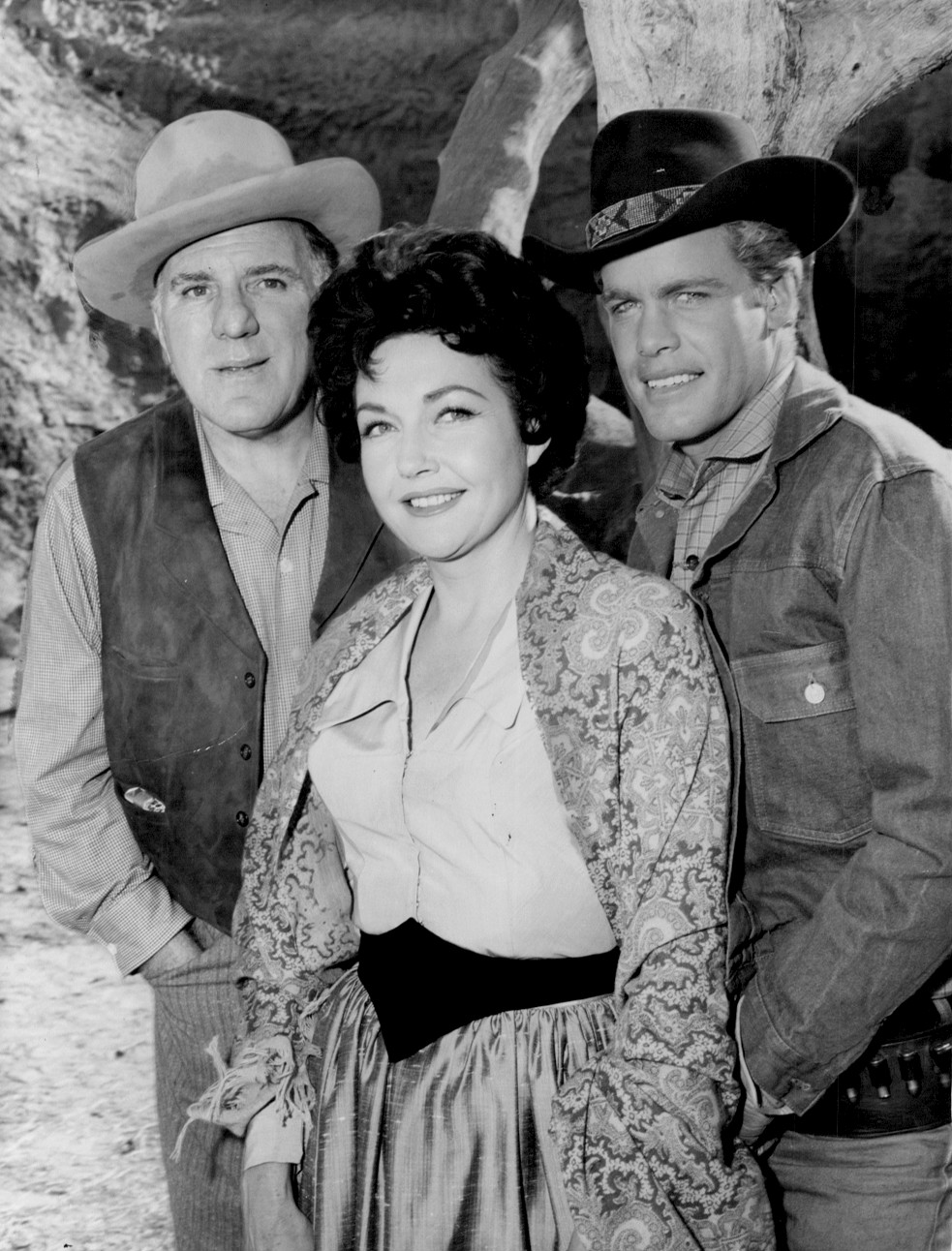
William Bendix, Lynn Bari, and McClure in Overland Trail (1960)

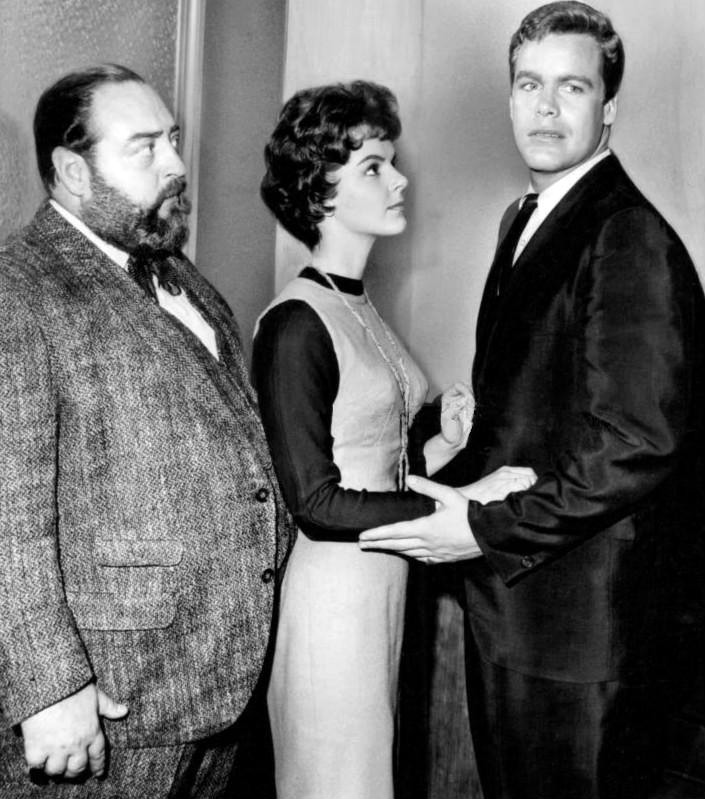
Sebastian Cabot, Carolyn Craig, and McClure in Checkmate (1962)

=== Film ===
- Friendly Persuasion (1956) – Soldier (uncredited)
- The Enemy Below (1957) – Ens. Merry (uncredited)
- South Pacific (1958) – Pilot in Hospital
- Gidget (1959) – Waikiki
- The Man Who Understood Women (1959) – Director's Assistant (uncredited)
- Because They're Young (1960) – Jim Trent
- The Unforgiven (1960) – Andy Zachary
- The Lively Set (1964) – Chuck Manning
- Shenandoah (1965) – Sam
- Beau Geste (1966) – John Geste
- The Longest Hundred Miles (1967) – Cpl. Steve Bennett
- The King's Pirate (1967) – Lt. Brian Fleming
- Nobody's Perfect (1968) – Doc Willoughby
- Backtrack (1969) – Trampas (archive footage)
- Terror in the Sky (1971 TV movie) – George Spencer
- The Birdmen (1971 TV movie) – Major Harry Cook
- The Death of Me Yet (1971 TV movie) – Edward Young / Paul Towers
- Playmates (1972 TV movie) – Kermit Holvey
- The Judge and Jake Wyler (1972 TV movie) – Jake Wyler
- The Bloody Vultures of Alaska (1973) – Don Rutland
- Death Race (1973 TV movie) – Lt. Del Culpepper
- The Land That Time Forgot (1974) – Bowen Tyler
- Satan's Triangle (1975 TV movie) – Lt. J. Haig
- What Changed Charley Farthing (1976) – Charley Farthing
- At the Earth's Core (1976) – David Innes
- SST: Death Flight (1977 TV movie) – Hank Fairbanks
- The People That Time Forgot (1977) – Bowen Tyler
- Wild and Wooly (1978 TV movie) – Delaney Burke
- Warlords of Atlantis (1978) – Greg Collinson
- Humanoids from the Deep (1980) – Jim Hill
- Firebird 2015 A.D. (1981) – McVain
- The House Where Evil Dwells (1982) – Alex Curtis
- Cannonball Run II (1984) – The Slapper
- Omega Syndrome (1986) – Detective Milnor
- 52 Pick-Up (1986) – Mark Arveson
- Tapeheads (1988) – Sid Tager
- Dark Before Dawn (1988) – Kirkland
- Prime Suspect (1989) – Dr. Brand
- Battling for Baby (1992 TV movie) – David
- Dead Man's Revenge (1994 TV movie) – Granger
- Maverick (1994) – Riverboat Poker Player #3
- Riders in the Storm (1995) – Hamilton Monroe

=== Television ===
- Death Valley Days - Ganse Taylor in "Fifteen Places to Fame" (1957)
- Maverick – Hotel desk clerk (uncredited) in "The Jewelled Gun" (1957)
- Lawman – Jed Ryan in "The Visitor" (1959)
- Riverboat – Corporal Jenkins in "The Face of Courage" (1959)
- U.S. Marshal – Bruce Williams in "The Threat (1959)
- The Twilight Zone – Pete Grant (episode: "Mr. Denton on Doomsday", 1959)
- Coronado 9 – Jimmy Hoke in "The Widow of Kill Cove" (1960)
- Hennesey – Seaman Davies in "Angel Face" (1960)
- Johnny Midnight – Rice in "Mother's Boy" (1960)
- Overland Trail – Frank Flippin (1960) - 17 episodes
- Checkmate – Jed Sills (1960–62) - 70 episodes
- The Virginian – Trampas (1962–71) - 249 episodes
- The Longest Hundred Miles (1967)
- Search - C. R. Grover (1972-1973) - 23 episodes
- Barbary Coast – Cash Conover (1975) - 13 episodes
- Satan's Triangle – Lt. J. Haig (1975)
- Roots – Jemmy Brent (1977)
- The Rebels – Eph Tait (1979)
- Fantasy Island - Brent Harris (episode: "The Angel's Triangle/Natchez Bound" 1982)
- The Fall Guy (1982-1985) five episodes (once as Himself)
- Fantasy Island – Craig Bradshaw (episode: "The High Cost of Loving/To Fly With Eagles" 1984)
- Hardcastle and McCormick – Dt. Hamilton (episode: "School For Scandal" 1984)
- Too Close For Comfort – David Jenner (episode: "Divorce Chicago Style" 1984)
- Airwolf – Darren McBride (episode: "Half-Pint", 1985)
- Murder, She Wrote – "Steal Me a Story" (1987)
- Out of This World – Mayor Kyle Applegate (1987–1991)
- Superboy – "Hollywood" – Professor Zugar (airdate May 13, 1989)
- B.L. Stryker – "The King of Jazz" - Alexander Ludlow (November 18, 1989)
- Matlock – "The Outcast" – Elliot Jones (Feb 7, 1992)
- Kung Fu: The Legend Continues – Captain Foster (episode: "Cruise Missiles" 1995)
- In the Heat of the Night – "Time's Long Shadow" (1994)
- The Gambler Returns: The Luck of the Draw (1991)
