= Kevin Connor (director) =

English film and television director (born 1937)

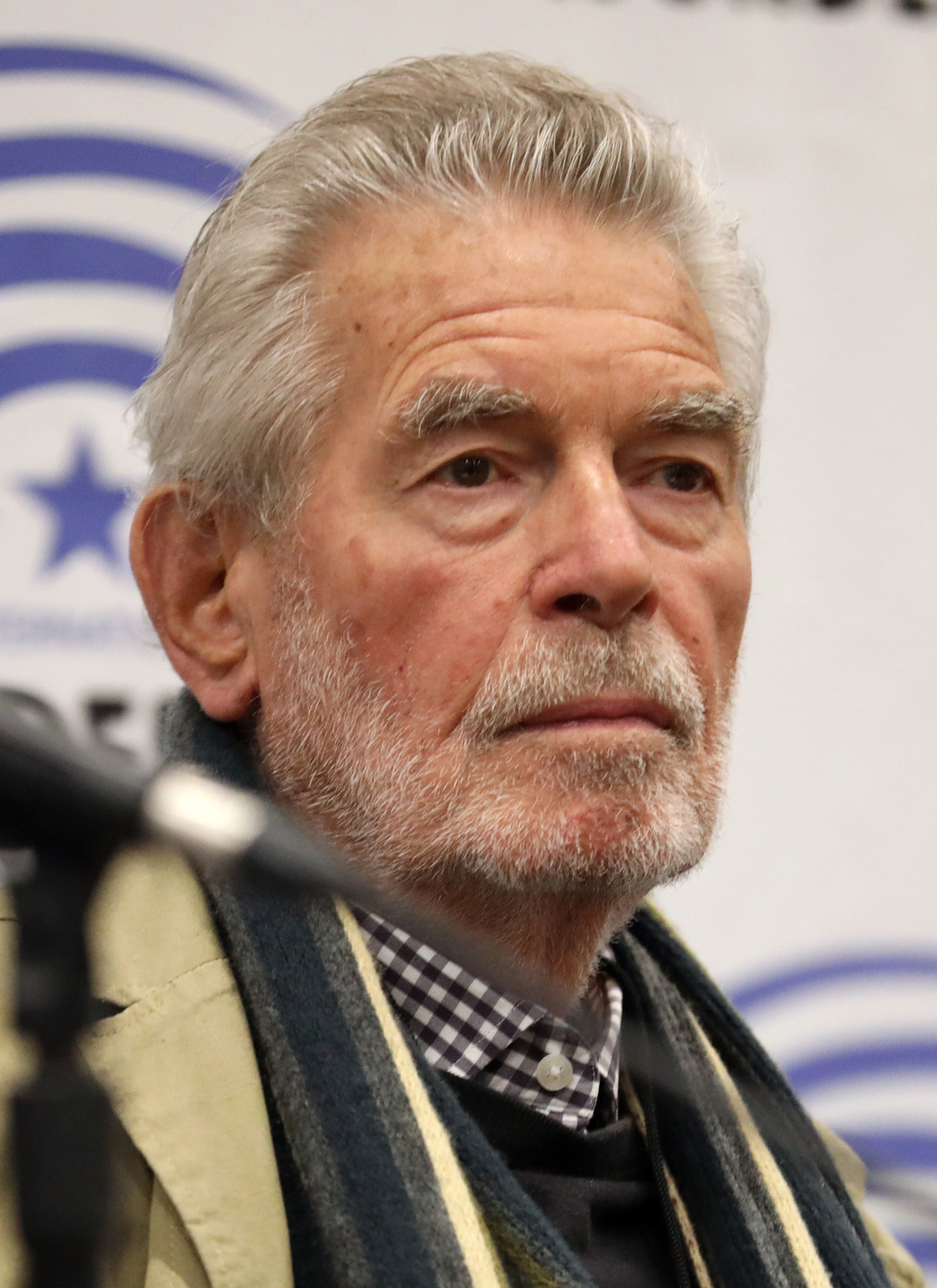
- Connor at the 2024 WonderCon
- Born: 14 July 1937 (age 88); London, England
- Occupations: Director, producer, writer

Kevin Connor (born 14 July 1937) is an English film and television director based in Hollywood.

== Biography ==
Connor was born in Kings Cross, London on 14 July 1937. He left school in 1953, first working on documentary films in Soho. Later, he became a sound editor on several British productions, working with directors such as Tony Richardson, Richard Attenborough, Richard Lester, Abraham Polonsky and Michael Cacoyannis. Connor worked as an editor on Oh! What a Lovely War in 1969, and was eventually given his directing break with From Beyond the Grave in 1974, thanks to producer Milton Subotsky of Amicus Productions.

He is best remembered for directing 1970s fantasy/adventure films such as The Land That Time Forgot (1974), At the Earth's Core (1976), The People That Time Forgot (1977), Warlords of Atlantis (1979) and Arabian Adventure (1979).

Connor has also directed other films such as Trial by Combat (1976), Motel Hell (1980), The House Where Evil Dwells (1982), Sunset Grill (1993) and Domestic Import (2006), as well as many TV miniseries and films, including Goliath Awaits, North and South: Book II, The Return of Sherlock Holmes, Great Expectations, Diana: Her True Story, Liz: The Elizabeth Taylor Story, Mother Teresa: In the Name of God's Poor, In the Beginning, Frankenstein, Blackbeard and Marco Polo.

His other television work includes episodes of Return of the Saint, Hart to Hart and Space 1999.

== Selected filmography ==
Year	Title	Role
1969	Oh! What a Lovely War	Editor
1974	From Beyond the Grave	Director
1974	The Land That Time Forgot	Director
1976	At the Earth's Core	Director
1976	Trial by Combat	Director
1977	The People That Time Forgot	Director
1979	Warlords of Atlantis	Director
1979	Arabian Adventure	Director
1980	Motel Hell	Director
1982	The House Where Evil Dwells	Director
1993	Sunset Grill	Director
2004	Frankenstein	Director
2006	Domestic Import	Director
