= The People That Time Forgot (film) =

1977 film by Kevin Connor

- U.S. theatrical release poster
- Directed by: Kevin Connor
- Screenplay by: Patrick Tilley
- Based on: The People That Time Forgot by Edgar Rice Burroughs
- Produced by: Max Rosenberg
- Starring: Patrick Wayne; Sarah Douglas; Thorley Walters; Dana Gillespie; Shane Rimmer; Doug McClure
- Cinematography: Alan Hume
- Edited by: John Ireland; Barry Peters
- Music by: John Scott
- Production company: Amicus Productions
- Distributed by: American International Pictures
- Release date: 27 August 1977
- Running time: 91 minutes
- Countries: United Kingdom; United States
- Language: English
- Budget: $400,000-$500,000
- Box office: $3 million

The People That Time Forgot is a 1977 adventure fantasy film based on the novel The People That Time Forgot (1918) and Out of Time's Abyss (1918) by Edgar Rice Burroughs. Filmed in Technicolor, it was produced by Britain's Amicus Productions and directed by Kevin Connor. Like Connor's other two Burroughs-derived films, The Land That Time Forgot and At the Earth's Core, the film was distributed in the United States by American International Pictures. It is the last film made by Amicus before the production company folded.

The film is a direct sequel to The Land That Time Forgot, which initiated the series in 1974. The story follows a rescue expedition, led by Patrick Wayne in search of his friend, played by Doug McClure, who had vanished many years before. The expedition lands on Caprona, the same fantastic prehistoric land where dinosaurs and barbarian tribes of men co-exist.

== Plot ==
Major Ben McBride organises a mission to the Antarctic wastes to search for his friend Bowen Tyler who has been missing in the region for several years. A British naval survey ship takes them to Caprona. McBride's party: the paleontologist Norfolk, gunner and mechanic Hogan and photographer Lady Charlotte 'Charlie' Cunningham fly over the mountain wall of Caprona in an amphibious aircraft, but are attacked by a fierce giant pterodactylus and forced down.

They find themselves in a world populated by primitive warriors and prehistoric creatures, all of whom they must evade in order to get back safely to their ship. They meet a cave-girl, Ajor, who can speak English (she was taught by Tyler); she leads them to the land of a race of samurai-like warriors called the Nargas, who are keeping Tyler prisoner. When the volcano that the Nargas worship erupts, they must escape the cataclysm engulfing the land. Tyler sacrifices himself to cover their retreat.

== Cast ==
- Patrick Wayne as Ben McBride
- Doug McClure as Bowen Tyler
- Sarah Douglas as Lady Charlotte "Charly" Cunningham
- Dana Gillespie as Ajor
- Thorley Walters as Norfolk
- Shane Rimmer as Hogan
- Tony Britton as Captain Lawton
- John Hallam as Chung-Sha
- David Prowse as Executioner
- Milton Reid as Sabbala
- Kiran Shah as Bolum
- Richard LeParmentier as Lieutenant Whitby
- Jimmy Ray as Lieutenant Graham

== Production ==
- According to Kevin Connor, Amicus Productions wanted to follow At the Earth's Core with an adaptation of the John Carter of Mars stories, but could not afford the rights, so they made this sequel instead.
- Although the film was made by Amicus Productions, the company folded before it was released, meaning AIP took sole credit.

== Critical reception ==
Time Out commented: "A lame sequel to Connor's earlier Edgar Rice Burroughs adaptation, The Land That Time Forgot, which was at least occasionally lively"; the Radio Times called it an "OK sequel," but a "constipated confection" with "ludicrous mechanised dinosaurs and hopeless acting from an interesting cast." The reviewer however, found that "A few shots, composed around celebrated fantasy illustrations, compensate for all the film's shortcomings"; and critic Derek Winnert similarly opined "the monsters and special effects are below par," but "there are effective moments, and there is some curiosity value in seeing singer Dana Gillespie playing Ajor"; while Blu-ray.com thought the film "may not be the most polished effort around, but there's fun to be had with its crazy dino encounters."

== See also ==
- List of films featuring dinosaurs
