= The Land That Time Forgot (1974 film) =

1974 film

- Theatrical release poster by Tom Chantrell
- Directed by: Kevin Connor
- Screenplay by: Michael Moorcock; James Cawthorn
- Based on: The Land That Time Forgot by Edgar Rice Burroughs
- Produced by: John Dark; Max Rosenberg
- Starring: Doug McClure; John McEnery; Susan Penhaligon; Keith Barron; Anthony Ainley
- Narrated by: Doug McClure
- Cinematography: Alan Hume
- Edited by: John Ireland
- Music by: Douglas Gamley
- Production company: Amicus Productions
- Distributed by: British Lion Films (UK); American International Pictures (US)
- Release date: 29 November 1974
- Running time: 91 minutes
- Countries: United Kingdom; United States
- Language: English
- Budget: $250,000–over $1 million
- Box office: 1,908,872 admissions (France) $2.5 million

The Land That Time Forgot is a 1974 adventure fantasy film directed by Kevin Connor and written by Michael Moorcock and James Cawthorn, based upon the 1918 novel The Land That Time Forgot by Edgar Rice Burroughs. The film, which is a British-American co-production, stars Doug McClure, John McEnery, Keith Barron, Susan Penhaligon, Anthony Ainley and Declan Mulholland.

== Plot ==
A bottle with a manuscript inside it is thrown into the sea. It floats to the coast of England, where a sailor discovers the bottle and opens it to read the manuscript. Bowen Tyler narrates.

During World War I, Bowen Tyler and Lisa Clayton are passengers on the ship torpedoed by Captain von Schoenvorts. Along with a few surviving British officers, Tyler persuades the other men to take over the surfacing submarine, this being their only chance for survival. After they confront the Germans on the deck, a battle ensues, and they seize the German U-boat. Tyler takes command, hoping to sail to a British port. Von Schoenvorts has his crew steer toward a safe sea port, but German officer Dietz breaks loose and smashes the sub's radio.

Off course and running out of fuel in the South Atlantic, the U-boat and its crew enter an uncharted subcontinent called Caprona, a fantastical land of lush vegetation where dinosaurs still roam, co-existing with primitive man. There are also deposits of crude oil. If the Germans and British work together, the oil can be refined and enable their escape from the island. Tyler and von Schoenvorts agree to work together.

Tyler discovers the secret of Caprona: individuals evolve not through natural selection but by migrating northward across the island. With the submarine working again, a sudden outbreak of volcanic eruptions occurs across the island. Dietz starts a mutiny, shoots Captain von Schoenvorts, and takes command. He abandons Tyler and Clayton in Caprona in an attempt to escape, but the U-boat cannot function in the boiling waters, and the crew is killed as it sinks. Tyler and Clayton are stranded, and being the only survivors of their group, are forced to move northward. Tyler throws the bottle with the manuscript inside it that's seen at the beginning of the film.

== Cast ==
- Doug McClure as Bowen Tyler
- John McEnery as Captain Friedrich von Schoenvorts
- Susan Penhaligon as Lisa Clayton
- Keith Barron as John Bradley
- Anthony Ainley as Lt. Dietz
- Godfrey James as Borg
- Declan Mulholland as Olson
- Roy Holder as Plesser
- Andrew McCulloch as Sinclair
- Ron Pember as Jones
- Brian Hall as Schwartz
- Peter Sproule as Hindle
- Steve James as First Sto-Lu

== Production ==
Amicus originally wanted to cast Doug McClure in the lead, but he refused, so they signed Stuart Whitman. Then Samuel Z. Arkoff of American International Pictures came on board as co-financers, providing the bulk of the budget, but would only make the film if McClure was cast. He changed his mind and agreed to do the film.

Kevin Connor said: "Doug was a great asset. In fight scenes he was especially good due to his hours of American TV action films. He knew exactly where the camera was at all times and threw punches precisely where the effect would work for the screen. He was always co-operative and came up with many ideas."

Shooting began in February 1974 and lasted 16 weeks. Shepperton Studios were used for filming, whilst some of the scenes set in the landscapes of Caprona were filmed in a disused claypit in Reading, Berkshire.

Kevin Connor recalled: "The reason we went for the hand puppets was for a more fluid look. Roger Dicken, who created the dinosaurs did such fine details and had the movement down so well that we went with him and used that technique. Also, we developed the use of a small VistaVision camera to shoot the dinosaur back-ground plates which gave us great quality because the exposed frame is twice the size of a normal 35mm. Everything was shot front projection as well."

The U-boat and ships were models and the dinosaurs and other prehistoric animals were puppets, hand-held or on strings rather than stop motion. The speaking part of von Schoenvorts was later dubbed in post-production by German-born actor Anton Diffring.

Amicus was to make two more Burroughs adaptations, The People That Time Forgot (1977), a direct sequel to this film starring Patrick Wayne, Sarah Douglas and McClure in an appearance midway towards the end, and the unrelated At the Earth's Core (1976), with McClure, Peter Cushing, and Caroline Munro. All three films were distributed in the United States by American International Pictures.

== Reception ==
=== Box office ===
The film was the 14th biggest hit at the British box office in 1975.

=== Critical reception ===
Critics and audiences gave The Land That Time Forgot mixed reviews, earning the film a Rotten Tomatoes approval rating of 47% based on 15 reviews. The movie was featured in the 11th season of the cult science fiction series Mystery Science Theater 3000.

The New York Times described the film is "an initially agreeable picture about the discovery of a mystery realm where various stages of evolution coexist", but "the early virtues of Land collapse once the island is reached and the traffic jam in artificial monsters develops."

== Comic book adaptations ==
A comic book adaptation of the film appeared in Marvel Movie Premiere, a one-shot black-and-white magazine published by Marvel Comics in September 1975. It was written by Marv Wolfman and drawn by Sonny Trinidad. From 2016 to 2021, American Mythology Productions published several original comic book miniseries based on the movie, including a reprinting of the original comics adaptation of the film. These miniseries include Prisoners of Caspak, Terror from the Earth’s Core (a crossover series with Pellucidar), See-Ta the Savage, Fear on Four Worlds (a crossover series with Carson of Venus, The Moon Maid, and Pellucidar), Fearless, and a crossover miniseries, Zorro in the Land That Time Forgot.

== See also ==
- List of films featuring dinosaurs
- Journey to the Beginning of Time (1955 film)
- The People That Time Forgot (1977 film)
- The Land That Time Forgot (2009 film)
- Kong: Skull Island (2017)
