= At the Earth's Core (film) =

1976 science-fiction movie by Kevin Connor

- Theatrical release poster by Tom Chantrell
- Directed by: Kevin Connor
- Screenplay by: Milton Subotsky
- Based on: At the Earth's Core; 1914 novel by Edgar Rice Burroughs
- Produced by: John Dark; Max Rosenberg; Milton Subotsky
- Starring: Doug McClure; Peter Cushing; Caroline Munro
- Cinematography: Alan Hume
- Edited by: John Ireland; Barry Peters
- Music by: Mike Vickers
- Production companies: American International Pictures; Amicus Productions
- Distributed by: American International Pictures; British Lion Films (UK)
- Release date: 15 July 1976
- Running time: 89 minutes
- Countries: United Kingdom; United States
- Language: English
- Budget: $400,000-$500,000—$1.5 million
- Box office: $3.2 million

At the Earth's Core is a 1976 fantasy-science fiction film produced by Britain's Amicus Productions. A British-American co-production, the film was directed by Kevin Connor and stars Doug McClure, Peter Cushing and Caroline Munro. It was filmed in Technicolor, and is based on the 1914 fantasy novel At the Earth's Core by Edgar Rice Burroughs, the first book of his Pellucidar series, in token of which the film is also known as Edgar Rice Burroughs' At the Earth's Core.

== Plot ==
Dr. Abner Perry, a British Victorian scientist, and his US financier David Innes make a test run of the Iron Mole, a drilling machine in a Welsh mountain. While drilling underground, the extreme heat emanating from the magma around the Mole knocks the duo out and makes them temporarily lose control over where the machine is taking them. After it passes through the magma crust and gets closer to the Earth's core, the temperature inside the Mole starts to lower, and the duo regains consciousness. Perry and Innes eventually reach a surface where they can safely get out. The two notice that they are in a strange land filled with the flora and fauna of prehistoric times. After being chased and attacked by a treacherous bird-headed dinosaur (resembling the Psittacosaurus), they are eventually captured by the Sagoths, ape-like creatures, who aim to enslave every human tribe there. The Sagoths are themselves ruled by a species of telepathic flying reptiles (Pterosaurs), the Mahars.

The Mahars have the power of mind control. David falls for the enslaved Princess Dia. She is eventually chosen as a sacrificial victim in the Mahar city, while David is put to work in the magma mines and Perry visits the library. Worried about Dia, David incites a riot within the mine and is captured with Ra, another rebellious slave. The two are sent to the arena where a crowd of slaves watch. The Mahars send a giant Gorgonopsid to execute the duo, but with the help of Perry (who shouts about the creature's weak point from the crowd), David and Ra survive. They not only kill the gorgonopsid but an attacking Mahar as well, earning the respect of the slaves. David and Ra must rally the surviving human slaves to rebel and win their freedom. To achieve this, Innes, Ra and Dia organise the oppressed tribes and help them work together while Perry teaches them how to construct and use bows and arrows.

Together, the humans manage to kill the Mahars and subdue their minions. After repairing the Mole, Perry and Innes prepare to go back to the surface with Dia. However, despite how much Dia loves Innes, she believes that she will not be able to adjust in the surface world, like Innes does not fit in her own world. A distraught Innes accepts her reasoning and decides to return alone with Perry to the United Kingdom.

However, a miscalculation results in the Iron Mole resurfacing outside the White House, much to the dismay of two policemen standing guard there.

== Cast ==
- Doug McClure as David Innes
- Peter Cushing as Dr. Abner Perry
- Caroline Munro as Princess Dia
- Cy Grant as Ra
- Godfrey James as Ghak
- Sean Lynch as Hoojah
- Keith Barron as Dowsett
- Helen Gill as Maisie
- Anthony Verner as Gadsby
- Robert Gillespie as Photographer
- Michael Crane as Jubal
- Bobby Parr as Sagoth Chief
- Andee Cromarty as Girl Slave

== Production ==
The film was made following the success of The Land That Time Forgot, using the same star, producer, director and writer. Director Kevin Connor said, "The script wasn’t the greatest but it had some fun sequences in it. Cushing and McClure were a delight as usual and enjoyed working with each other."

Filming took place at Pinewood Studios in London. Kevin Connor recalled we devised a colour scheme for Pellucidar which was a mauve-orange backdrop. Most of the film was on one huge stage... and therefore the colour was very controllable."

According to Connor, "we tried to get the beasts bigger so as to interact better with the actors – more one on one. We had a somewhat bigger budget thanks to the success of Land. The beasts were specially designed so that small stunt guys could work inside the suits in a crouched position and on all-fours. Needless to say it was very cramped and the stunt guys had to take frequent breathers. Some worked better than others – but we were experimenting and trying something different."

Connor added, "We had a lot of fire in that; we did have some small explosions on the set. We had those bubbling eggs blowing up in the bottom of the cauldron that covered the sound-stage floors in this goo."

== Release ==
The film premiered at the Marble Arch Odeon in London on 15 July 1976.

=== Box office ===
The film was the 18th most popular British film of 1976. It made a profit. Amicus and Kevin Connor tried to follow the movie with an adaptation of the John Carter stories but the rights were too expensive so instead they made The People that Time Forgot. After At the Earth's Core Subotsky and Rosenberg ended their partnership and John Dark, Kevin Connor and Rosenberg formed a company and made three more movies together.

=== Critical reception ===
Cinefantastique called the film "just about rock bottom, making the most juvenile excesses of Toho and Daiei seem positively scintillating by comparison."

The New York Times wrote: "All the money used to make 'At the Earth's Core' seems to have been spent on building monsters with parrotlike beaks that open, close, and emit a steady squawking as if someone were vacuuming next door. Close up, the monsters look like sections of rough concrete wall and the decision to film them in closeup is only one example of the total lack of talent or effort with which the picture is made ... the movie is a kind of no-talent competition in which the acting, the script, the direction and the camera-work vie for last place."

BFI Screenonline said, "Extravagant, colourful and thoroughly preposterous, At the Earth's Core is utterly without pretension but has the exuberant charm of the best of its decade."

== In popular culture ==
The film was "riffed" as part of the 2017 revival of Mystery Science Theater 3000, released April 14, 2017 on Netflix.

== See also ==
- Journey to the Center of the Earth, 1959 film based on the Jules Verne novel
- The People That Time Forgot, 1977 film with Doug McClure in another Burroughs adaptation
- Journey to the Center of the Earth, 2008 direct-to-DVD film similar to At the Earth's Core
