= Sentinel =

Sentinel may refer to:

== Places ==
=== Mountains ===
==== United States ====
- Mount Sentinel, a mountain next to the University of Montana in Missoula, Montana
- Sentinel Dome, a naturally occurring granite dome in Yosemite National Park, California
- Sentinel Mesa, in Monument Valley, Utah
- Sentinel Mountain (Montana), in Glacier National Park
- Sentinel Peak (Arizona), a peak in the Tucson Mountains
- The Sentinel (Zion), a sandstone summit in Zion National Park, Utah
- Sentinel Rock, a peak in Yosemite National Park, California

==== Elsewhere ====
- Sentinel Buttress, a volcanic crag on James Ross Island, Antarctica
- Sentinel Peak (Alberta), Canada
- Sentinel Peak (Antarctica)
- Sentinel Peak (British Columbia), Canada
- Sentinel Range, a mountain range in Antarctica
- The Sentinel, Hout Bay, rock formation in Western Cape, South Africa

=== Other locations ===
- Sentinel, Arizona
- Sentinel, California
- Sentinel, Missouri
- Sentinel, Oklahoma
- Sentinel Island (disambiguation)

== Arts, entertainment, and media ==
=== Artworks ===
- Sentinel (sculpture), a 2000 sculpture by Tim Tolkien
- Sentinels (Hudson), a 2005 public artwork by American artist Jon Barlow Hudson
- The Sentinel (Centralia, Washington statue), a 1924 bronze sculpture by Alonzo Victor Lewis
- The Sentinel, a 2003 steel sculpture by Albert Paley on the campus of the Rochester Institute of Technology

=== Comics ===
- Sentinel (comic book), a comic book series

=== Fictional entities ===
- Sentinel (comics), one of a group of mutant-hunting robots in the Marvel Universe
- Sentinel, a paradigm role in Final Fantasy XIII
- Sentinel, a character class in the Mass Effect universe
- Alan Scott, the original Green Lantern, called "sentinel" at one point
- Sentinels, a faction in Call of Duty: Advanced Warfare
- Sentinel, a computer in the TV show Transformers: Beast Wars
- Sentinels, one of the two teams in Defense of the Ancients
- Sentinels, a group of super soldiers infected with a variant of the Chimera virus in Resistance 2
- Sentinels, a law enforcement-themed clan in Urban Rivals
- The Sentinel, a boss character in Borderlands: The Pre-Sequel
- The Sentinel, the fictitious military academy attended by Frank Underwood, in the Netflix Originals TV series House of Cards
- The Sentinels, antagonistic dinosaur robots from the animated web series Murder Drones
- The Sentinels, a fictional football team from the movie The Replacements (film)

=== Films ===
- The Sentinel (1977 film), an American film based on the Jeffrey Konvitz novel
- The Sentinel (1992 film) (La Sentinelle in French), a French film directed by Arnaud Desplechin
- The Sentinel (2006 film), an American thriller directed by Clark Johnson starring Michael Douglas

=== Gaming ===
- Sentinel (iOS game), a 2010 iOS sci-fi tower defense game
- Sentinel, a 1984 computer game created by Bryan Brandenburg
- Sentinel (1990 video game), a game for the Atari 2600 and 7800 developed by Imagineering
- Sentinel: Descendants in Time, a 2004 computer game published by Detalion
- The Sentinel (module), an adventure module for Dungeons & Dragons
- The Sentinel (video game), a 1986 game created by Geoff Crammond
- Sentinel, a sniper rifle in battle royale game Apex Legends
- Sentinels (esports), an American esports company
- The Elder Scrolls VI: Sentinel, the upcoming sixth mainline game in The Elder Scrolls series

=== Literature ===
- Gundam Sentinel, a 1987 serial "photo-novel"
- Sentinels novels, a series of novels by Van Allen Plexico
- The Sentinel (collection), a collection of short stories by Arthur C. Clarke
- The Sentinel (Konvitz novel), 1974, by Jeffrey Konvitz
- "The Sentinel" (short story), a 1951 short story by Arthur C. Clarke
- The Sentinel (Child novel), 2020, by Lee and Andrew Child
- The Sentinels (Carter novel), a 1980 young adult novel by Peter Carter

=== Music ===
==== Groups and labels ====
- Sentinel (band), an American indie dream rock duo
- Sentinel (electronic music group), Australian electronic dance music group
- Sentinel Sound, a reggae and dancehall sound system from Stuttgart, Germany

==== Albums ====
- Sentinel (album), a 1979 album by Nigel Mazlyn Jones
- "Sentinel" (instrumental), by Mike Oldfield
- The Sentinel (album), an album by Pallas

==== Songs ====
- "Sentinel", a song by Alice Cooper on Dragontown
- "Sentinel", a song by At The Throne of Judgment on The Arcanum Order
- "Sentinel", a song by Hilltop Hoods on The Calling
- "Sentinel", a song by VNV Nation on Of Faith, Power and Glory
- "Sentinel", a song by Within the Ruins on Phenomena
- "The Sentinel", a song by Car Bomb on w^w^^w^w
- "The Sentinel", a song by Celldweller on Soundtrack for the Voices in My Head Vol. 2
- "The Sentinel", a song by Judas Priest on Defenders of the Faith
- "Sentinels", a song by Green Carnation on Leaves of Yesteryear
- "Sentinels", a song by Xerath on III

=== Periodicals ===
- Sentinel (newspaper), a list of newspapers called Sentinel
- Christian Science Sentinel (originally The Christian Science Weekly), an American magazine
- CTC Sentinel
- The Sentinel (India), published in Guwahati, Assam, India
- The Sentinel (KSU), published by Kennesaw State University
- The Sentinel, published by journalism students at Heritage High School
- The Sentinel, published by Melbourne High School

=== Television ===
- The Sentinel (TV series), a 1996–1999 Canadian crime drama series
- "The Sentinel" (American Horror Story), a 2022 episode
- "The Sentinel" (Stargate SG-1), a 2002 episode
- The Sentinels (TV series), a 2025 French sci-fi series

== Brands and enterprises ==
- Sentinel (publisher), a book publisher
- Sentinel (revolver), a brand of gun made by High Standard Manufacturing Company
- Sentinel, a brand name for the drug cenegermin
- Sentinel Offender Services, a for-profit probation company
- Sentinel Sound, a reggae and dancehall sound system from Stuttgart, Germany
- SentinelOne, a cybersecurity company based in Mountain View, California

== Buildings ==
- Sentinel Building (disambiguation), multiple buildings with this name
- Sentinel Secondary School, a school in West Vancouver, British Columbia
- The Sentinels, two residential block towers in Birmingham, UK

== Computing ==
- Sentinel (FBI), an FBI software project replacing the failed Virtual Case File
- Sentinel value, a flag value used to terminate a loop, a variable length list, or other analogous purpose

== Military ==
- AN/GSQ-272 Sentinel, a US Air Force weapons system
- LGM-35 Sentinel, an American intercontinental missile under development
- MPQ-64 Sentinel, a radar used by the US military
- Raytheon Sentinel, an aircraft used by the Royal Air Force
- RQ-170 Sentinel, USAF stealth drone officially acknowledged in early December 2009
- Sentinel tank, an Australian-built World War II Cruiser Tank
- Sentinel-class cutter, a Fast Response Cutter with the US Coast Guard
- Sentinels, some members of the 3rd U.S. Infantry Regiment
- Stinson L-5 Sentinel, a World War II era American liaison aircraft
- Sentinel 2, a variant of the Terrex ICV armoured personnel carrier

== Science and technology ==
- Sentinel (satellite), GMES Sentinel satellites, series of ESA funded Earth Observation satellites
- Sentinel (space telescope), a proposed (but cancelled) asteroid-hunting infrared telescope by the B612 Foundation
- Animal sentinels, animals which give early indications to environmental hazards
- Sentinel lymph node, the first lymph node affected by a metastasising cancer
- The Sentinel series, a series of US radioisotope thermoelectric generators

== Transportation ==
=== Locomotives and lorries ===
- Sentinel Waggon Works, a British engineering firm that produced lorries and locomotives:
  - LMS Sentinels 7160-3
  - LMS Sentinel 7164, a small shunting locomotive
  - LMS Sentinel 7192, a geared steam locomotive
  - S&DJR Sentinels, two small steam locomotives for shunting

=== Vessels ===
- Sentinel (steamboat), a small wooden steamboat associated with the Puget Sound Mosquito Fleet

== Others ==
- Sentinel (horse)

== See also ==
- Sentry (disambiguation)
- Watchman (disambiguation)
- Guard (disambiguation)
- Sentinel Project (disambiguation)
- Centinela (disambiguation)
- Sentinelle
- La Sentinelle (disambiguation)
- Sentinelese, an ethnic group on North Sentinel Island
