= Watchman =

Watchman or Watchmen may refer to:

== Arts, entertainment, and media ==
- Watchman (film), a 2019 Tamil thriller film
- Watchman (novel), a 1988 thriller novel by Ian Rankin
- Watchmen, a 1986 comic book limited series by Alan Moore and Dave Gibbons
  - Watchmen (2009 film), the 2009 film adaptation of the comic book
  - Watchmen (2024 film), the 2024 animated film adaptation of the comic book
  - Watchmen (TV series), a TV series adaptation of the comic book and feature film
  - Watchmen: Motion Comic, a TV miniseries adaptation that aired in 2008
  - Watchmen: The End Is Nigh, a video game prequel to the film
- The Watchman (Grubb novel), a 1961 novel by Davis Grubb
- The Watchmen (band), a Canadian rock band

== Other uses ==
- Watchman (law enforcement), a member of a group who provided law enforcement
- Picket (military), a person on watch for enemy action
- Lookout, a sailor responsible for watchkeeping aboard ship
- Security guard, a person who watches over and protects property, assets, or peoples
- Watchman (mascot), a Staffordshire Bull Terrier, mascot of the Staffordshire and Mercian Regiments
- HMS Watchman (D26), a destroyer of the British Royal Navy launched in 1917 and sold in 1945 for scrapping
- Sony Watchman, a line of portable television devices produced by Sony
- Watchman camera, a system of cameras for controlling traffic and deterring speeding in the United Kingdom
- Watchman device, a type of left atrial appendage occlusion system to prevent blood clot formation in certain heart rhythm disturbances
- Watchman Island, a small sandstone island in the Waitemata Harbour of Auckland, New Zealand

== See also ==
- City guard
- Enforcer (disambiguation)
- Internal security
- Nightwatchman (disambiguation)
- Sentinel (disambiguation)
- Sentry (disambiguation)
- The Watchman (disambiguation)
- Vigilante
- Warden
