= Centinela =

Centinela may refer to:

- El Centinela (Baja California), a mountain west of Mexicali, Baja California, Mexico
- La Centinela, an archaeological site in the Chincha Valley of Peru
- Centinela Avenue, major street in the Westside region of Los Angeles County, California
- Centinela Creek, Los Angeles County, California
- Centinela mine, a copper and gold mine in Atacama Desert, Chile
- Centinela Ridge, cloud forest area in Ecuador
- Centinela Springs, a historic artesian spring
- El Centinela, the Spanish-language version of the Catholic Sentinel
- California State Prison, Centinela

== See also ==
- Sentinel (disambiguation)
- TV Sentinela, a television station in Óbidos, Pará, Brazil
- Centel, a former American telecommunications company
