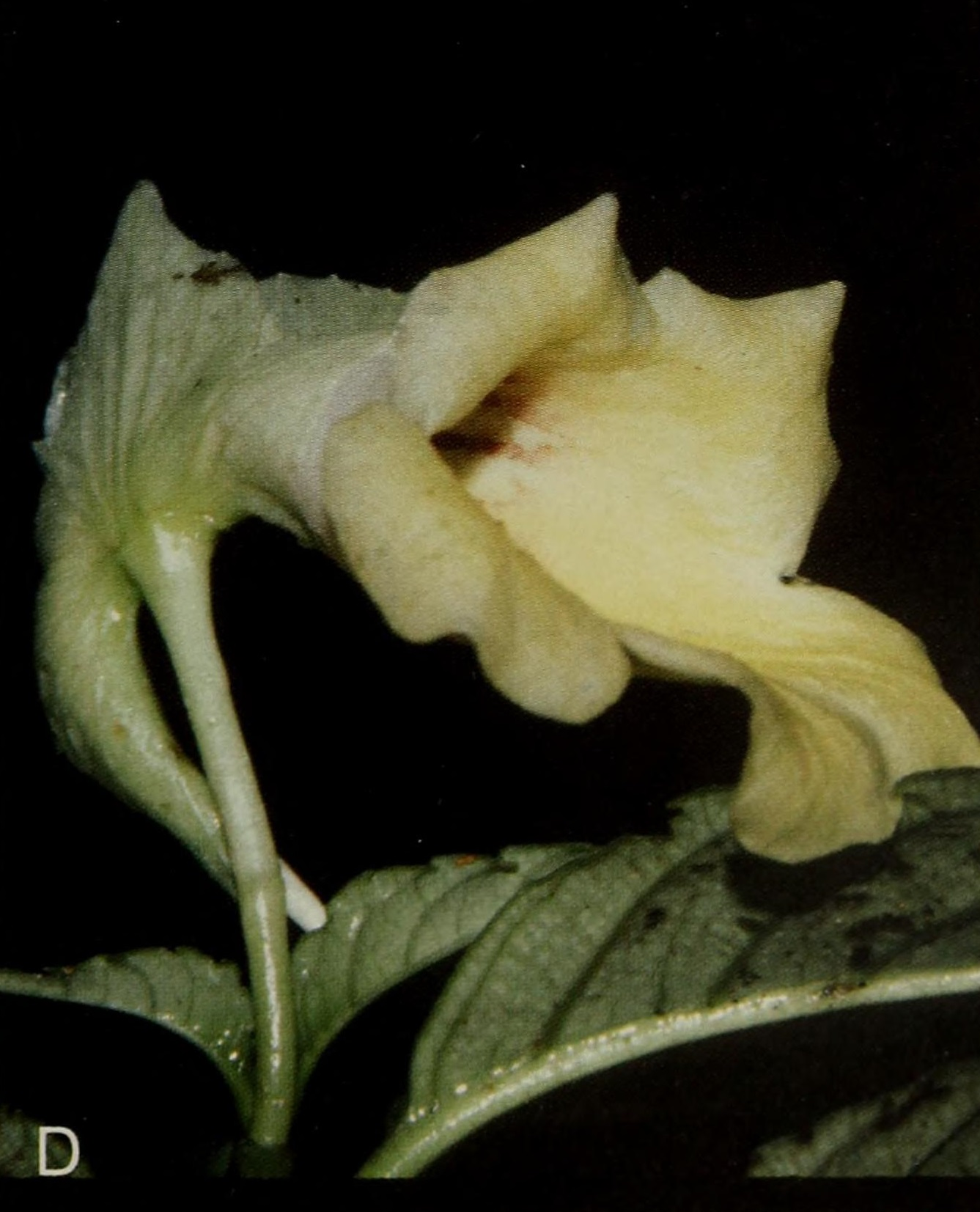

Conservation status
- Endangered (IUCN 3.1)

Scientific classification
- Kingdom: Plantae
- Clade: Tracheophytes
- Clade: Angiosperms
- Clade: Eudicots
- Clade: Asterids
- Order: Lamiales
- Family: Gesneriaceae
- Genus: Gasteranthus
- Species: G. tenellus

Binomial name
- Gasteranthus tenellus L.E.Skog & L.P.Kvist

= Gasteranthus tenellus =

Species of flowering plant

Gasteranthus tenellus is a species of flowering plant in the family Gesneriaceae. It is endemic to Ecuador. Its natural habitats are subtropical or tropical moist lowland forests and subtropical or tropical moist montane forests.
