= Gasteranthus ternatus =

Conservation status
- Endangered (IUCN 3.1)

Scientific classification
- Kingdom: Plantae
- Clade: Tracheophytes
- Clade: Angiosperms
- Clade: Eudicots
- Clade: Asterids
- Order: Lamiales
- Family: Gesneriaceae
- Genus: Gasteranthus
- Species: G. ternatus

Binomial name
- Gasteranthus ternatus L.E.Skog & L.P.Kvist

Species of flowering plant

Gasteranthus ternatus is a species of flowering plant in the family Gesneriaceae. It is a subshrub or shrub endemic to Ecuador. Its natural habitat is subtropical or tropical moist montane forests.
