= Guard =

Guard or guards may refer to:

== Professional occupations ==
- Bodyguard, who protects an individual from personal assault
- Crossing guard, who stops traffic so pedestrians can cross the street
- Lifeguard, who rescues people from drowning
- Prison guard, who supervises prisoners in a prison or jail
- Security guard, who protects property, assets, or people
- Conductor (rail) § Train guard, in the UK, Australia, New Zealand, and India

== Computing and telecommunications ==
- Guard (computer science), in programming language, an expression that directs program execution
- Guard (information security), a device for controlling communication between computer networks
- Guard interval, intervals in transmission, used in telecommunications
- Aircraft emergency frequency, commonly referred to as "guard"

== Governmental and military ==
- Border guard, a state security agency
- Coast guard, responsible for coastal defence and offshore rescue
- Colour guard, a detachment of soldiers assigned to the protection of regimental colors
- Commander-in-Chief's Guard, a unit of the Continental Army that protected General George Washington
- Foot guards, a senior infantry unit in some armies, often with ceremonial duties
- Guard (military), a military guard responsible for protection and ceremonial duties.
- Garda Síochána, Irish police force informally known as Guards
- Guard of honour, primarily ceremonial
- Guards (Russia), elite military in pre-revolutionary Russia
- Guards unit, a title earned by distinguished units in the former Soviet Union and in some contemporary ex-Soviet states
- Police in medieval contexts
- Royal Guard, military bodyguards, soldiers or armed retainers responsible for the protection of a royal person, often an elite unit of the regular armed forces.

== Sports ==
- Guard (gridiron football), a player between the center and the tackles on the offensive line
- Guard (basketball)
  - Point guard, or "playmaker"
  - Shooting guard, or "off guard"
  - Combo guard, combining both point and shooting guard
- Guard (grappling), a position in martial arts
- Color guard (flag spinning), people who toss flags, spin a rifle and a saber at performances with a marching band
- Winter guard, people who spin and toss flags, rifles, and/or sabers at indoor performances on a tarp

== Other uses ==
- Guard (surname)
- Guards (band), an American rock band
- Guards (steamboat)
- Guard (weapon), part of the handle of a sword designed to protect the user's hand
  - Guard (knife), finger protection barrier between the handle and the blade
- Guard dogs, guard llamas and guard geese, animals employed to watch for unwanted or unexpected animals or people
- Abdominal guarding, in medicine, the tensing of the abdominal wall muscles to guard inflamed organs
- Mate guarding, guarding of a potential or former mate from other individuals
- Mouthguard, a protective device for the mouth
- Wächter (Anatol) (Guards), several monumental sculptures by Anatol Herzfeld

== See also ==
- Civil Guard (disambiguation)
- The Guard (disambiguation)
- National Guard (disambiguation)
- Sentry (disambiguation)
- Sentinel (disambiguation)
