= The Watchman =

The Watchman or The Watchmen may refer to:

- The Watchman (Utah), a mountain in Zion National Park, Utah
- The Watchman (periodical), a 1796 periodical established and edited by Samuel Taylor Coleridge
- The Watchman (newspaper), a weekly newspaper published in Sydney, New South Wales, Australia
- The Watchman (Grubb novel), a 1961 novel by Davis Grubb
- The Watchman (Crais novel), a 2007 detective novel by Robert Crais
- The Watchmen, a 2004 thriller novel by John Altman
- The Watchman (album), a 1996 album by cellist Erik Friedlander
- The Watchman, a poem by Lucy Maud Montgomery
- The Watchmen (band)
- The Watchman, a TBN and YouTube show presented by Erick Stakelbeck

== See also ==
- Watchman (disambiguation)
