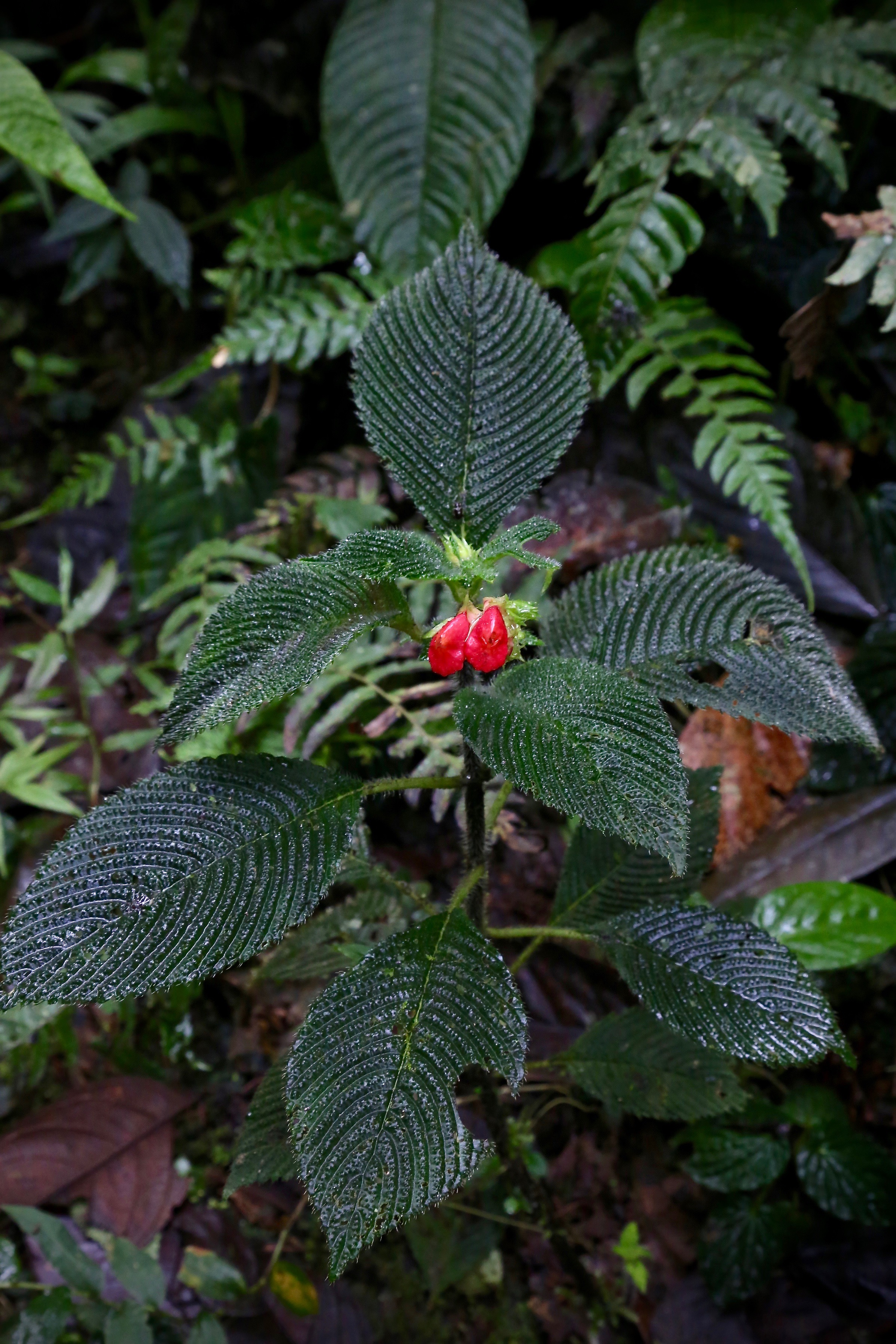

Scientific classification
- Kingdom: Plantae
- Clade: Tracheophytes
- Clade: Angiosperms
- Clade: Eudicots
- Clade: Asterids
- Order: Lamiales
- Family: Gesneriaceae
- Genus: Gasteranthus
- Species: G. quitensis

Binomial name
- Gasteranthus quitensis Benth.

Synonyms
- Besleria quitensis Hanst; Besleria sodiroana Fritsch

= Gasteranthus quitensis =

Species of flowering plant

Gasteranthus quitensis is an herbaceous species of subshrub which is endemic to Ecuador and southwestern Colombia.
