= La Sentinelle (disambiguation) =

La Sentinelle is a commune in northern France.

La Sentinelle may also refer to:

- La Sentinelle (film) or The Sentinel, a 1992 French film
- "La Sentinelle" (novelette), a 2003 novelette by Lucy Sussex
- La Sentinelle (Mauritius), a media company in Mauritius
- "La Sentinelle", a song by Luke

== See also ==
- La Sentinelle perdue, a part of the Îlots des Apôtres in the Crozet Archipelago
- Sentinel (disambiguation)
