= Gasteranthus timidus =

Conservation status
- Endangered (IUCN 3.1)

Scientific classification
- Kingdom: Plantae
- Clade: Tracheophytes
- Clade: Angiosperms
- Clade: Eudicots
- Clade: Asterids
- Order: Lamiales
- Family: Gesneriaceae
- Genus: Gasteranthus
- Species: G. timidus

Binomial name
- Gasteranthus timidus (C.V.Morton) Wiehler

Synonyms
- Besleria timida C.V.Morton

Species of flowering plant

Gasteranthus timidus is a species of flowering plant in the family Gesneriaceae. It is a subshrub or shrub endemic to Ecuador. Its natural habitat is subtropical or tropical moist lowland forests. The IUCN Red List assesses the species as Endangered.
