= Centinela Ridge =

Place of interest in Ecuador

Coordinates: 0°36′36″S 79°17′42″W

Centinela Ridge is an area of cloud forest surrounded by agriculture in Ecuador. Plant species thought to be extinct have been rediscovered in the area. New species have also been discovered in the area. In 1982 the biologist Alwyn Gentry discovered more than 100 new species, but the scientific find was short lived as shortly after local farmers deforested the region causing the extinction of most of these new discoveries.

Plant species found in the area include:

- Gasteranthus extinctus, once thought to be extinct.
- Amalophyllon miraculum
