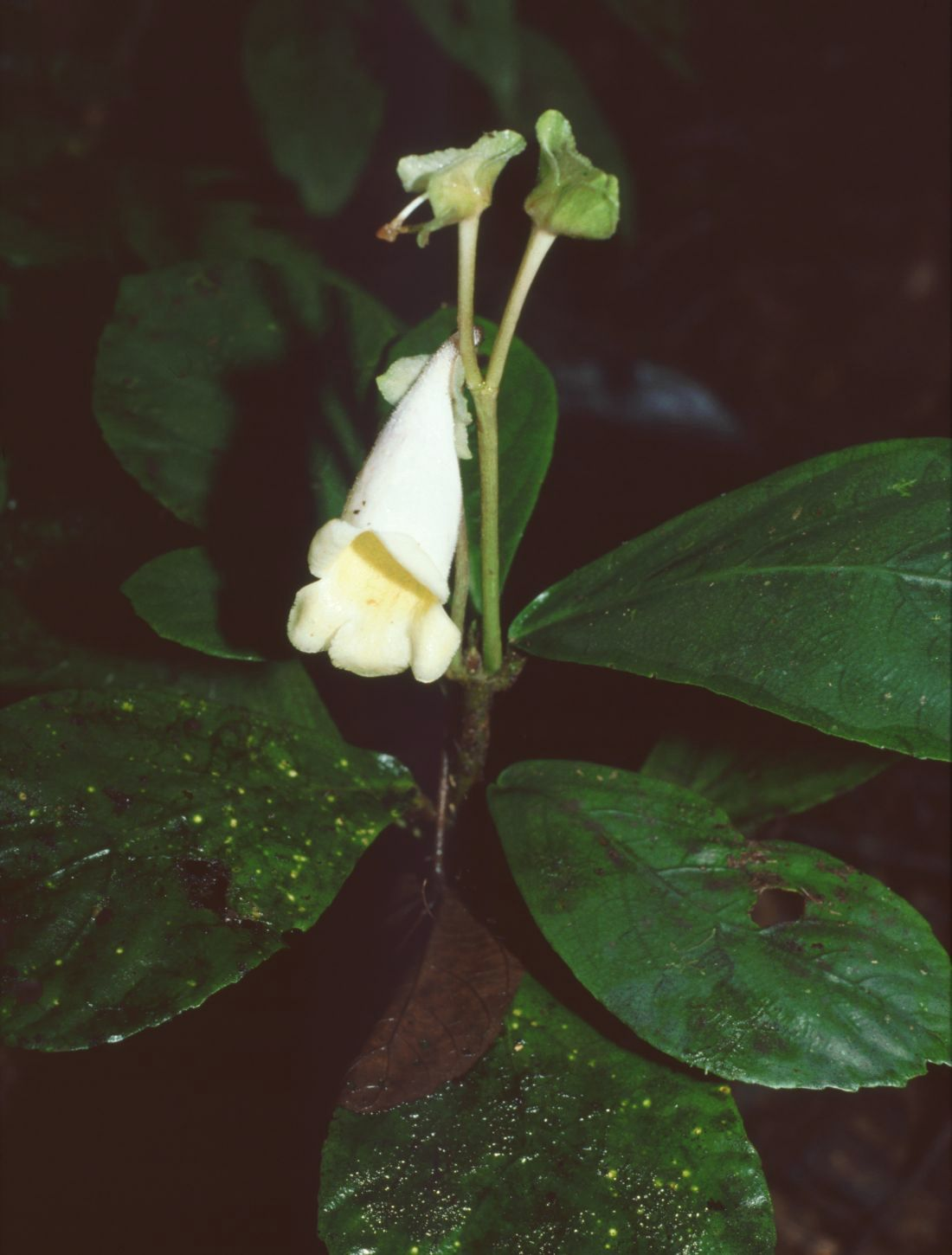
- Gasteranthus delphinioides

Scientific classification
- Kingdom: Plantae
- Clade: Tracheophytes
- Clade: Angiosperms
- Clade: Eudicots
- Clade: Asterids
- Order: Lamiales
- Family: Gesneriaceae
- Genus: Gasteranthus; Benth. (1846)

Species
- 39; see text

Synonyms
- Halphophyllum Mansf. (1936)

= Gasteranthus =

Genus of flowering plants

Gasteranthus is a genus of 35 species of herbs and soft-stemmed subshrubs in the flowering plant family Gesneriaceae. The species occur in Central America and South America, from southernmost Mexico to Bolivia. Numerous species are threatened with extinction, mainly due to deforestation. This is due to two reasons: For one thing, Gasteranthus species are native to countries in which destruction of primary forest runs rampant; also, these plants do not distribute well and therefore endemism is very frequent, for example on isolated mountain ranges.

These plants inhabit tropical forest and cloud forest. They grow in humid, shaded locations at altitudes of up to 1,800 m ASL. The flowers are usually colored in orange hues and often spotted, but background colors also include shades white, yellow and red. They are born in axillary cymes without bracteoles.

Gasteranthus was previously included in the closely related genus Besleria. The two genera have been separated on the basis of differences in their stomata (aggregated in Gasteranthus, scattered in Besleria) and fruits (fleshy capsule in Gasteranthus, berry in Besleria). Characteristic are the whitish dots on the leaf undersides caused by aggregations of stomata in Gasteranthus.

Two main groups can be distinguished in this genus: one group of species, with white to yellow, bell- or tube-shaped flowers, is probably pollinated mainly by euglossine bees. The other group has bright orange or red hypocyrtoid (inflated corolla tube with very small opening) flowers and are apparently pollinated mainly by hummingbirds.

== Species ==
The following 39 species are recognised in the genus Gasteranthus.

- Gasteranthus acropodus (Donn.Sm.) Wiehler
- Gasteranthus acuticarinatus M.Freiberg
- Gasteranthus adenocalyx L.E.Skog & L.P.Kvist
- Gasteranthus anomalus (C.V.Morton) Wiehler
- Gasteranthus atratus Wiehler
- Gasteranthus atrolimbus M.Freiberg
- Gasteranthus aurantiacus M.Freiberg
- Gasteranthus bilsaensis L.E.Skog & L.P.Kvist
- Gasteranthus calcaratus (Kunth) Wiehler
- Gasteranthus carinatus Wiehler
- Gasteranthus columbianus (C.V.Morton) Wiehler
- Gasteranthus corallinus (Fritsch) Wiehler
- Gasteranthus crispus (Mansf.) Wiehler
- Gasteranthus delphinioides (Seem.) Wiehler
- Gasteranthus diverticularis J.L.Clark
- Gasteranthus dressleri Wiehler
- Gasteranthus epedunculatus L.E.Skog & L.P.Kvist
- Gasteranthus extinctus L.E.Skog & L.P.Kvist
- Gasteranthus glaber L.E.Skog & L.P.Kvist
- Gasteranthus herbaceus (C.V.Morton) Wiehler
- Gasteranthus imbaburensis M.Freiberg
- Gasteranthus imbricans (Donn.Sm.) Wiehler
- Gasteranthus lateralis (C.V.Morton) Wiehler
- Gasteranthus leopardus M.Freiberg
- Gasteranthus macrocalyx Wiehler
- Gasteranthus mutabilis L.E.Skog & L.P.Kvist
- Gasteranthus orientandinus L.E.Skog & L.P.Kvist
- Gasteranthus osaensis L.E.Skog & L.P.Kvist
- Gasteranthus otongensis M.Freiberg
- Gasteranthus pansamalanus (Donn.Sm.) Wiehler
- Gasteranthus perennis (C.V.Morton) Wiehler
- Gasteranthus quitensis Benth.
- Gasteranthus recurvatus L.E.Skog & L.P.Kvist
- Gasteranthus tenellus L.E.Skog & L.P.Kvist
- Gasteranthus ternatus L.E.Skog & L.P.Kvist
- Gasteranthus timidus (C.V.Morton) Wiehler
- Gasteranthus trifoliatus M.Freiberg
- Gasteranthus villosus L.E.Skog & L.P.Kvist
- Gasteranthus wendlandianus (Hanst.) Wiehler
