= Sentinel Island =

Sentinel Island may refer to:

- Sentinel Island (Tasmania), Australia
- Sentinel Island (Colorado), United States
- Sentinel Island (Alaska), location of the Sentinel Island Light lighthouse
- Sentinel Island (Washington), one of the San Juan Islands, U.S.
- North Sentinel Island, part of the Andaman Islands, India, and home to the isolated Sentinelese
- South Sentinel Island, part of the Andaman Islands, India

== See also ==
- Sentinel (disambiguation)
- Sentinelese (disambiguation)
