= Gasteranthus perennis =

Conservation status
- Endangered (IUCN 3.1)

Scientific classification
- Kingdom: Plantae
- Clade: Tracheophytes
- Clade: Angiosperms
- Clade: Eudicots
- Clade: Asterids
- Order: Lamiales
- Family: Gesneriaceae
- Genus: Gasteranthus
- Species: G. perennis

Binomial name
- Gasteranthus perennis (C.V.Morton) Wiehler

Species of flowering plant

Gasteranthus perennis is a species of plant in the family Gesneriaceae. It is endemic to Ecuador. Its natural habitat is subtropical or tropical moist montane forests.
