= Sentinelese (disambiguation) =

The Sentinelese are an indigenous people of North Sentinel Island in the Andaman Islands.

Sentinelese may also refer to:

- Sentinelese language, the assumed language of the Sentinelese
- Relating to Sentinel Island (disambiguation)
