= Sentinel Project =

Sentinel Project may refer to:

- Sentinel Project for Genocide Prevention
- Satellite Sentinel Project
- Sentinel (FBI)
- Sentinel program
