= Big Indian (Utah) =

Butte in San Juan County, Utah, United States

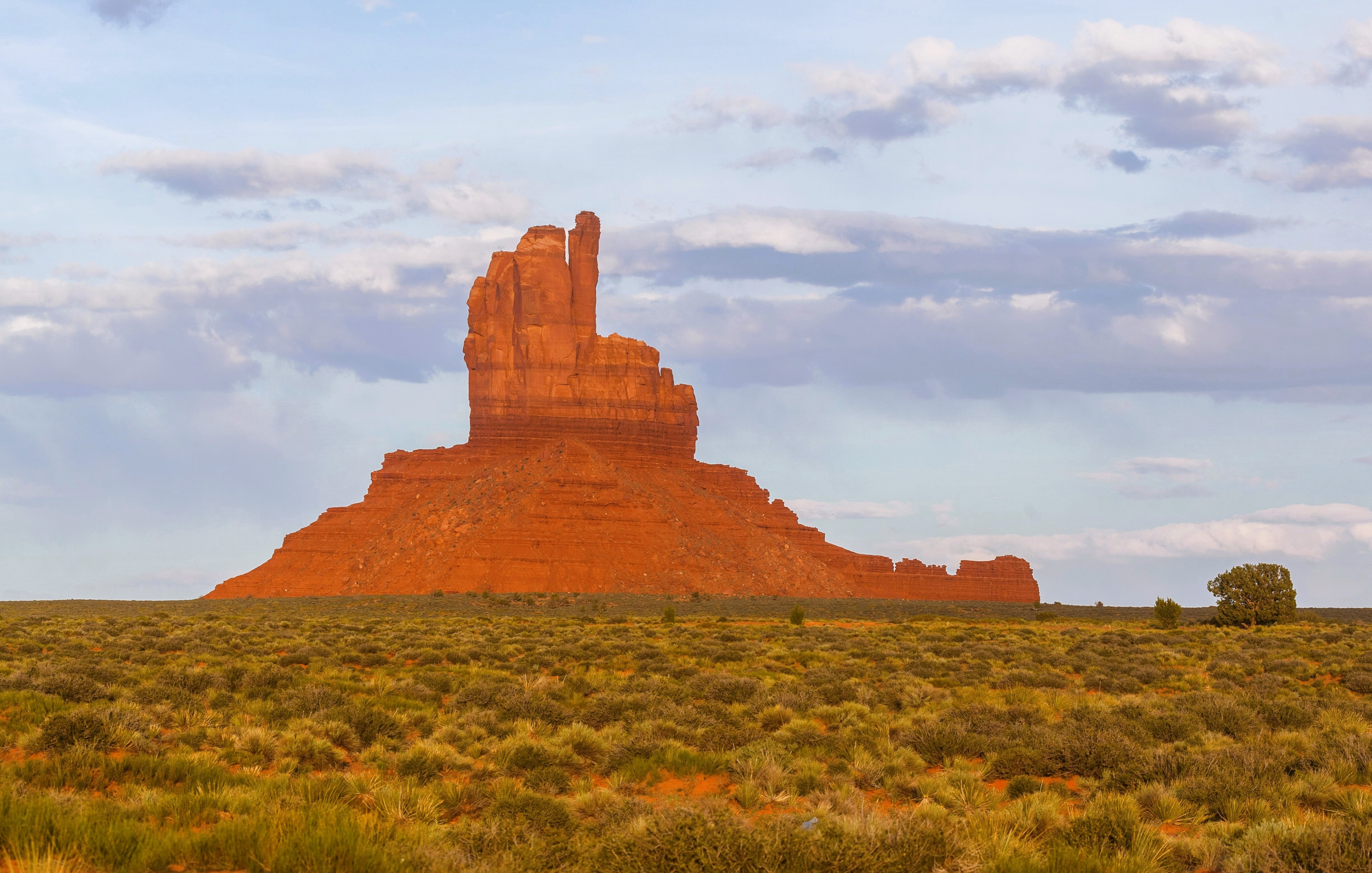
- West aspect

Highest point
- Elevation: 6,120 ft (1,865 m)
- Prominence: 580 ft (177 m)
- Parent peak: Brighams Tomb (6,739 ft)
- Isolation: 0.93 mi (1.50 km)
- Coordinates: 37°01′13″N 110°05′31″W

Geography
- Location within Utah Location within the United States
- Location: Monument Valley; San Juan County, Utah, U.S.
- Parent range: Colorado Plateau
- Topo map: USGS Monument Pass

Geology
- Rock age: Permian
- Mountain type: Butte
- Rock type: Sandstone

Big Indian is a 6,120-foot-elevation (1,865-meter) summit in San Juan County, Utah, United States.

== Description ==
Big Indian is situated three miles (4.8 km) north-northeast of the Monument Valley Tribal Park Visitor Center, on Navajo Nation land. It is an iconic landform of Monument Valley and can be seen from Highway 163. Precipitation runoff from this landform's slopes drains into the San Juan River drainage basin. Topographic relief is significant as the summit rises 700 feet (213 meters) above the surrounding terrain in 0.25 mile (0.4 km). The nearest higher summit is Sentinel Mesa, 0.62 miles (1.00 km) to the southwest. This landform's toponym was officially adopted in 1964 by the United States Board on Geographic Names. It is so named because the butte resembles the face of a native American looking south-southeast into the valley. "Big Chief" and "Big Indian Butte" were alternate names that were ultimately rejected.

== Geology ==
Big Indian is composed of two principal strata. The bottom layer is slope-forming Organ Rock Shale underlying cliff-forming De Chelly Sandstone. The rock was deposited during the Permian period. The buttes and mesas of Monument Valley are the result of the Organ Rock Shale being more easily eroded than the overlaying sandstone.

== Climate ==
Spring and fall are the most favorable seasons to visit Big Indian. According to the Köppen climate classification system, it is located in a semi-arid climate zone with cold winters and hot summers. Summers average 54 days above 90 °F (32 °C) annually, and highs rarely exceed 100 °F (38 °C). Summer nights are comfortably cool, and temperatures drop quickly after sunset. Winters are cold, but daytime highs are usually above freezing. Winter temperatures below 0 °F (−18 °C) are uncommon, though possible. This desert climate receives less than 10 inches (250 millimeters) of annual rainfall, and snowfall is generally light during the winter.

== Gallery ==
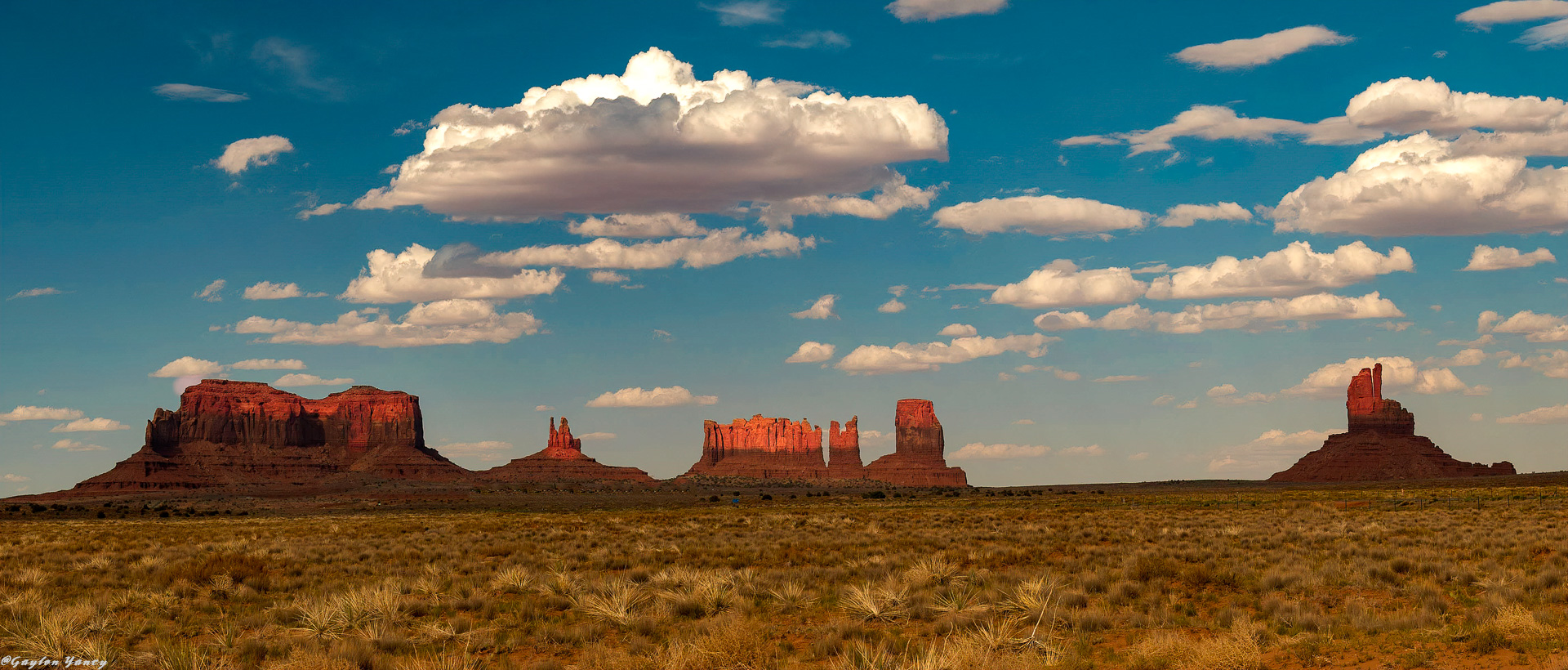
Brighams Tomb (left), Castle Rock (center), Big Indian (right)

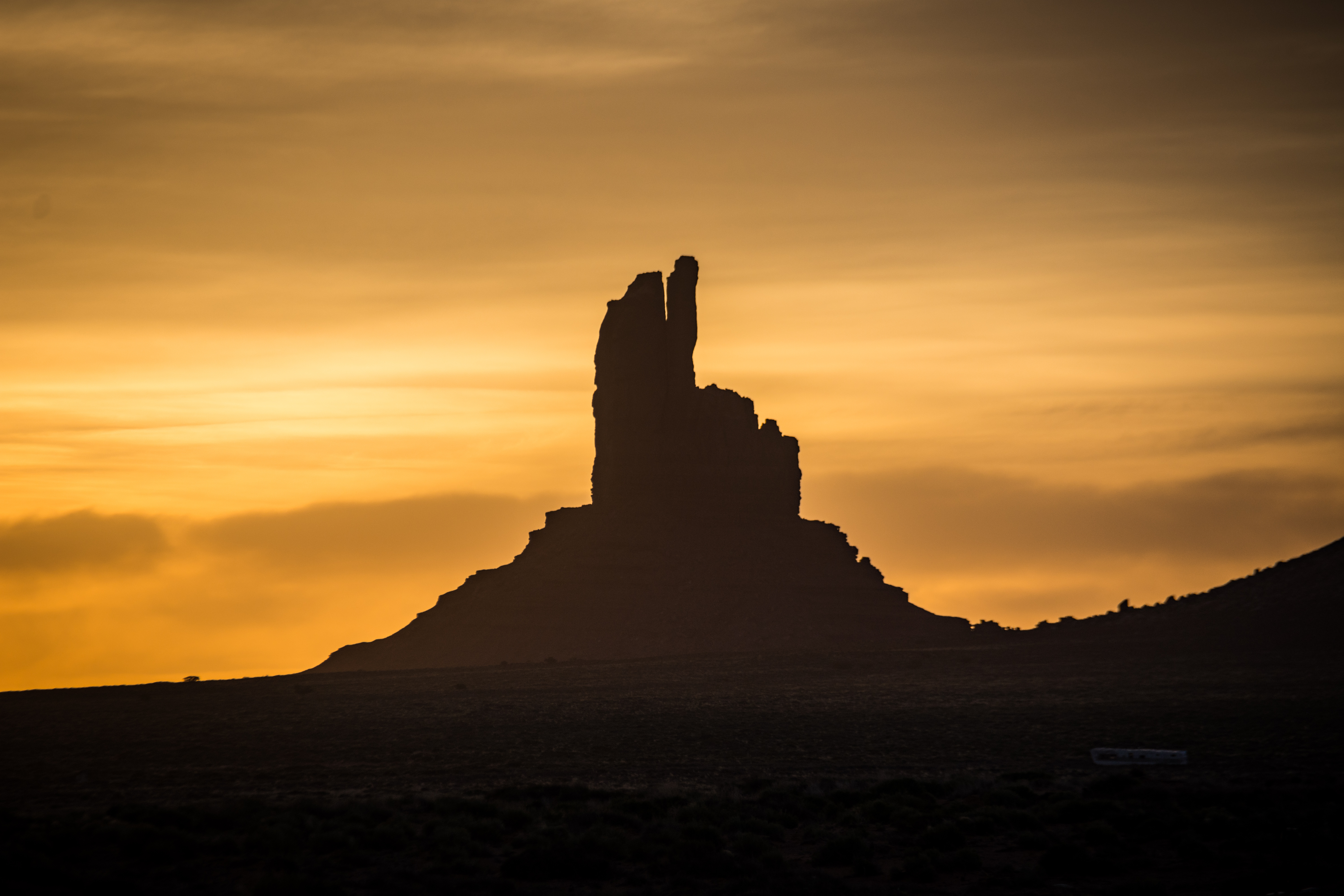

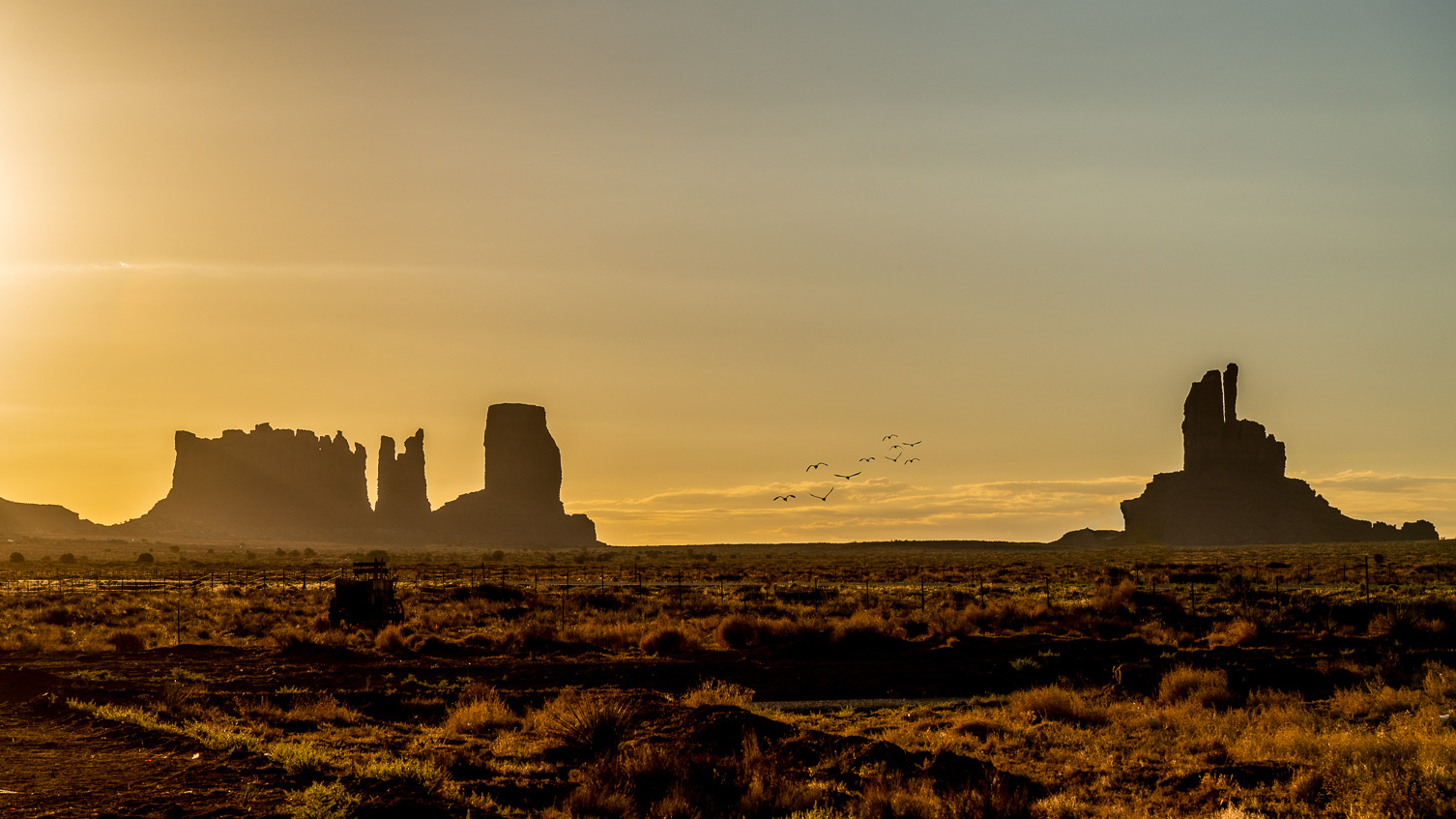
Big Indian to right, Castle Rock to left

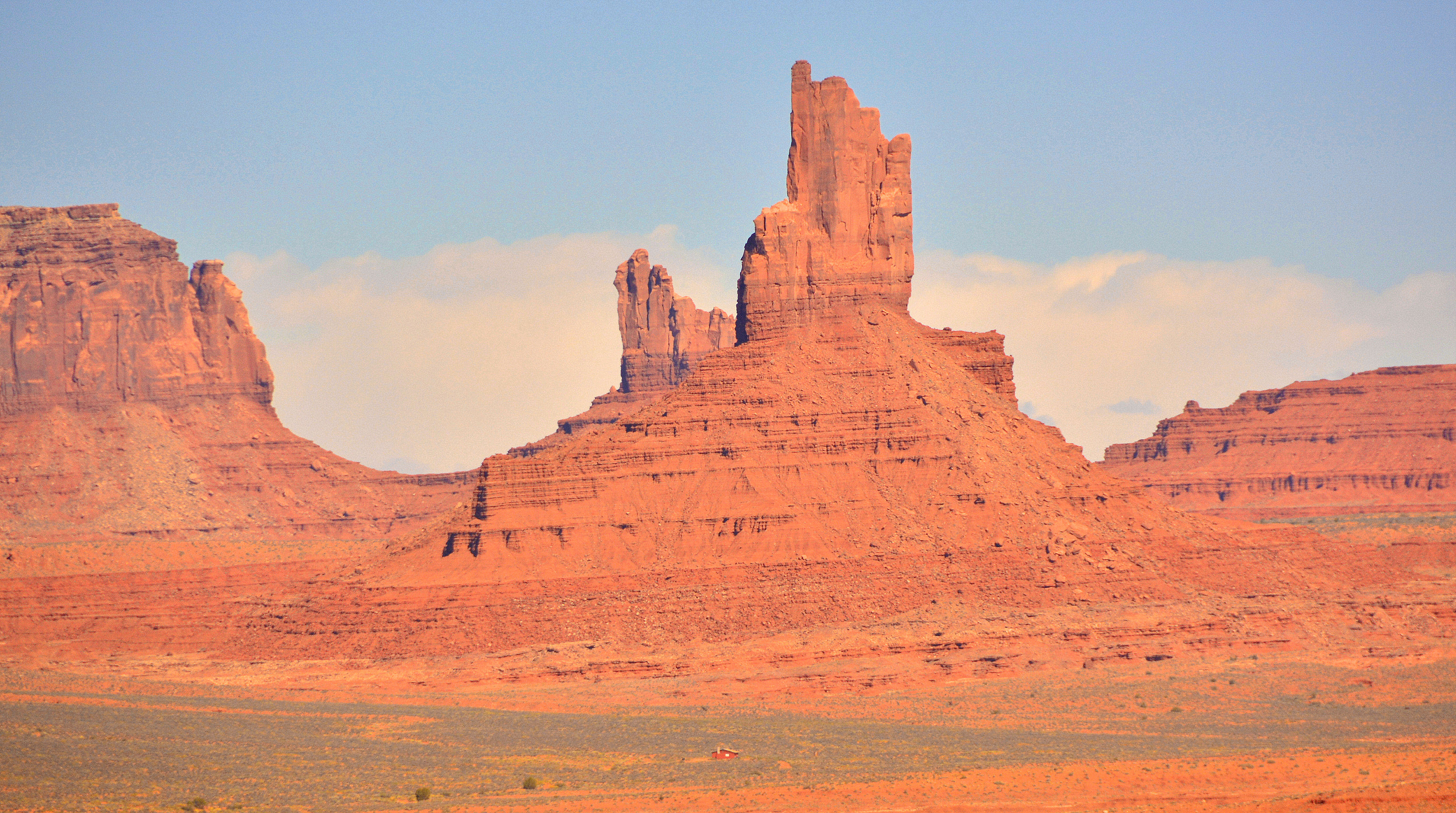
South aspect

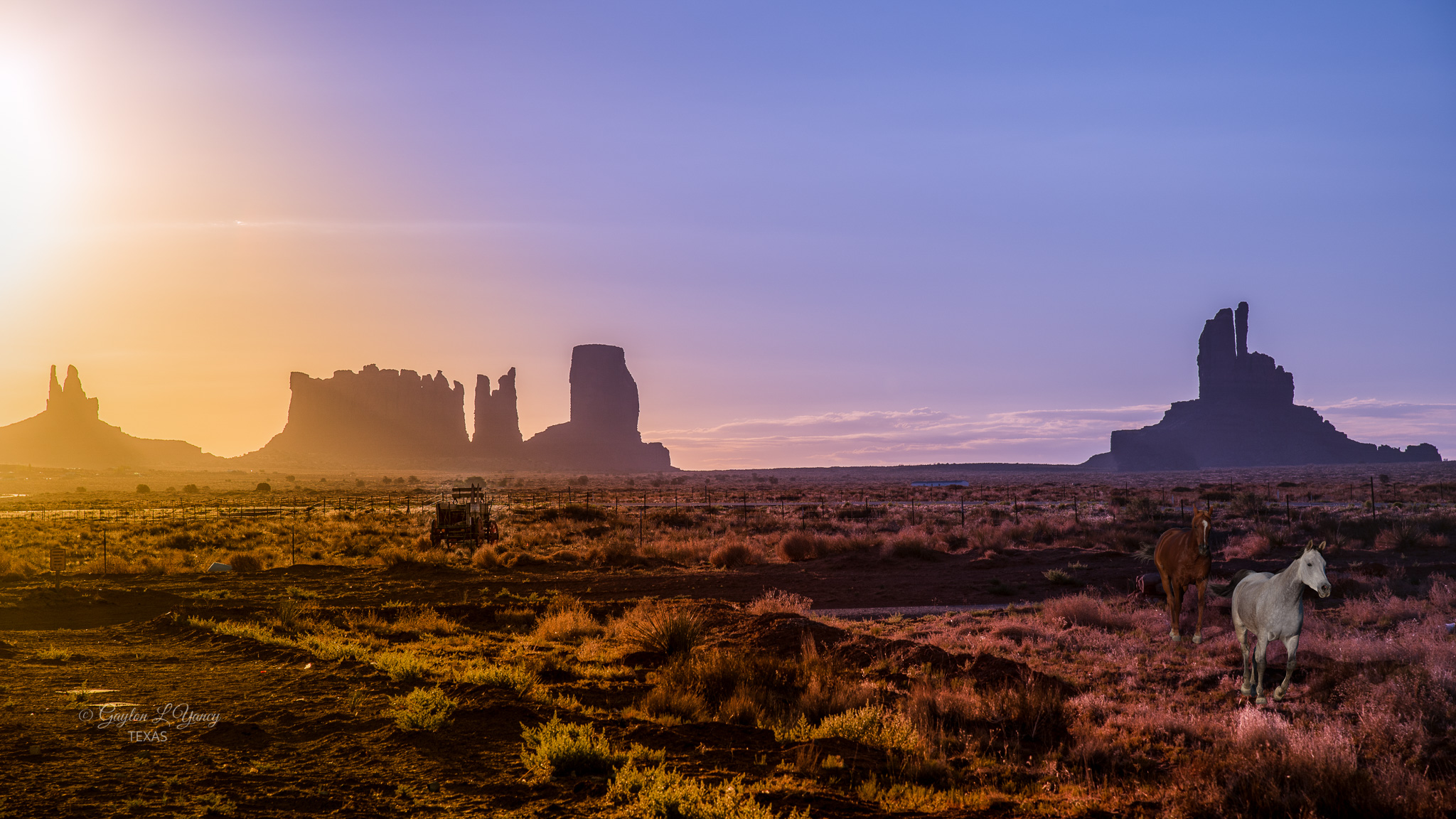
Big Indian to right

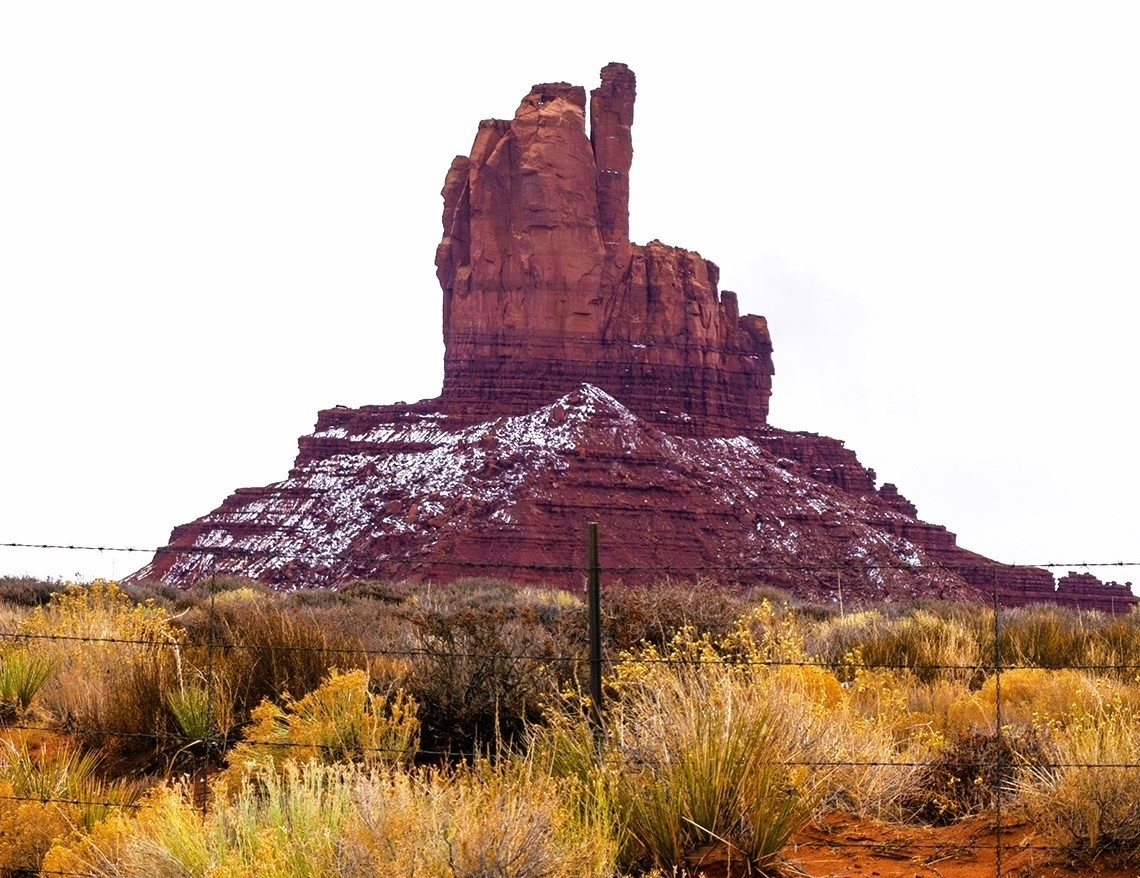
West aspect with dusting of autumn snow

== See also ==
- List of mountains of Utah
- List of appearances of Monument Valley in the media
