= Sentinel Building =

Sentinel Building may refer to:

- Sentinel Building (Centralia), Illinois
- Sentinel Building (North Shore City), New Zealand
- Sentinel Building (San Francisco), California
