= Sentinel (electronic music group) =

- Sentinel in 2023

Background information
- Origin: Melbourne, Australia
- Genres: Electronic dance music; Progressive house
- Years active: 2015–present
- Labels: Tomorrowland Music; STMPD RCRDS; Body Hi; Armada Music; UMG
- Members: Timothy Stent; Michael Stent; Johnathon Stent
- Website: sentineltrio.com

Sentinel are an Australian electronic dance music trio founded in Melbourne in 2015 by brothers Timothy, Michael, and Johnathon Stent.

In 2015, they began producing music together in the basement of their family home, later collaborating with artists such as Martin Garrix and Alesso. They have also produced remixes for Sia and Zara Larsson, releasing music on Tomorrowland Music, Stmpd Rcrds, Body Hi, and Armada Music.

== Career ==
Sentinel began producing music together in 2015 in the basement of their family home in Melbourne. Around 2020, the trio connected with The Shalizi Group and began collaborating with Swedish artist Alesso, resulting in their debut release "Only You", which brought them initial international recognition.

In 2023 they collaborated with Martin Garrix and Bonn on "Hurricane", released jointly on Tomorrowland Music and STMPD RCRDS, garnering over one million streams in its first day and 23 New Music Friday placements globally.

Later in 2023, Sentinel released their debut EP Eyes On You on Tomorrowland Music, comprising three tracks: "Eyes On You", "Get That Love" and "Hallucinate". The group made their Tomorrowland debut that same year.

In 2025, Sentinel collaborated with Alesso and Sick Individuals on "Upside Down", released on Tomorrowland Music. They also collaborated with Alesso on "Freedom".

In 2026 the group released "Like Fire" on Body Hi, Alesso's label, followed by a remix of Martin Garrix's "Catharina" on Th3rd Brain / STMPD RCRDS, and "Let There Be Light" on Tomorrowland Music in May 2026, the latter entirely written and produced by the trio.

== Discography ==
Year	Title	Artist	Label	Role
2026	"Underground"	Sentinel	STMPD RCRDS	Primary Artist
2026	"Bring The House Down"	Sentinel	STMPD RCRDS	Primary Artist
2026	"Let There Be Light"	Sentinel	Tomorrowland Music	Primary Artist
2026	"Catharina (Sentinel Remix)"	Martin Garrix	Th3rd Brain / STMPD RCRDS	Remixer
2026	"Like Fire"	Sentinel	Body Hi	Primary Artist
2025	"Upside Down"	Alesso, Sentinel & Sick Individuals	Body Hi / Tomorrowland Music	Primary Artist
2025	"Freedom"	Sentinel & Alesso	Body Hi	Primary Artist
2025	"Surrender"	Alesso & Becky Hill	Capitol Records	Co-Producer
2024	"Once Again"	Matisse & Sadko, Sentinel	STMPD RCRDS	Primary Artist
2024	"I Like It (Alesso & Sentinel Remix)"	Alesso & Nate Smith	Capitol Records	Remixer
2023	"Gimme Love (Sentinel Remix)"	Sia	Atlantic Records	Remixer
2023	"Guiding Light"	John Newman	Smash The House	Co-Producer
2023	"Hallucinate"	Sentinel	Tomorrowland Music	Primary Artist
2023	"Get That Love"	Sentinel	Tomorrowland Music	Primary Artist
2023	"Call Your Name"	Alesso	Tomorrowland Music	Co-Producer
2023	"Eyes On You"	Sentinel	Tomorrowland Music	Primary Artist
2023	"Without You"	Alesso	Geffen	Co-Producer
2023	"Hurricane"	Martin Garrix, Sentinel & Bonn	STMPD RCRDS / Tomorrowland Music	Primary Artist
2023	"Caught a Body"	Alesso & Ty Dolla $ign	Geffen	Co-Producer
2022	"Words (Sentinel Remix)"	Alesso & Zara Larsson	10:22PM	Remixer
2022	"Only You"	Alesso & Sentinel	10:22PM	Primary Artist
2021	"All I Wanna Do"	Sentinel	Enhanced Recordings	Primary Artist
2020	"Encrypt"	Sentinel	Release Records	Primary Artist
2018	"Orbit"	Sentinel	Release Records	Primary Artist
2016	"Start It"	Third Party & Sentinel	Release Records (Armada)	Primary Artist
2016	"Real Sound"	Third Party & Sentinel	Release Records (Armada)	Primary Artist
