= Sentry =

Sentry or The Sentry may refer to:

== Marvel Comics ==
- Sentry (Kree)
- Sentry (Curtis Elkins)
- Sentry (Robert Reynolds)
- Senator Ward (comics) or Sentry

== Vehicles ==
- Sentry (AUV), an autonomous underwater vehicle used to measure deep-ocean data
- E-3 Sentry AWACS, airborne early warning aircraft
- Lancair Sentry, American kit aircraft

== Sports ==
- The Sentry (California), a PGA Tour golf tournament at Torrey Pines Golf Course
- Tournament of Champions (golf), a PGA Tour golf tournament in Hawaii known as The Sentry in 2024 and 2025

== Other uses ==
- Picket (military) or sentry, one or more soldiers stationed on guard duty
- The Sentinel (video game), also known as The Sentry
- The Sentry (organization), an American non-profit investigative and policy organization
- The Sentry (Fabritius), a 1654 painting by Carel Fabritius
- "Sentry" (short story), a 1954 short story by Fredric Brown
- Sentry (monitoring system), an automatic near-Earth asteroid collision monitoring system
- Sentry Foods, a chain of grocery stores in Wisconsin, United States
- Sentry Insurance, a Wisconsin-based insurance company
- Sentry Island, Nunavut, Canada
- Sentry Siren, a company based out of Colorado, that manufactures warning equipment.

== See also ==
- General Orders for Sentries
- Nissan Sentra
- Sentinel (disambiguation)
- Guard (disambiguation)
- SENTRI
- Sentry gun, a gun that automatically aims and fires at targets
- SentrySafe, a safe manufacturing company headquartered in Rochester, New York
- Soviet frigate Storozhevoy
- Travel Sentry
