= Sentinel Mesa =

Mountain in Utah, United States

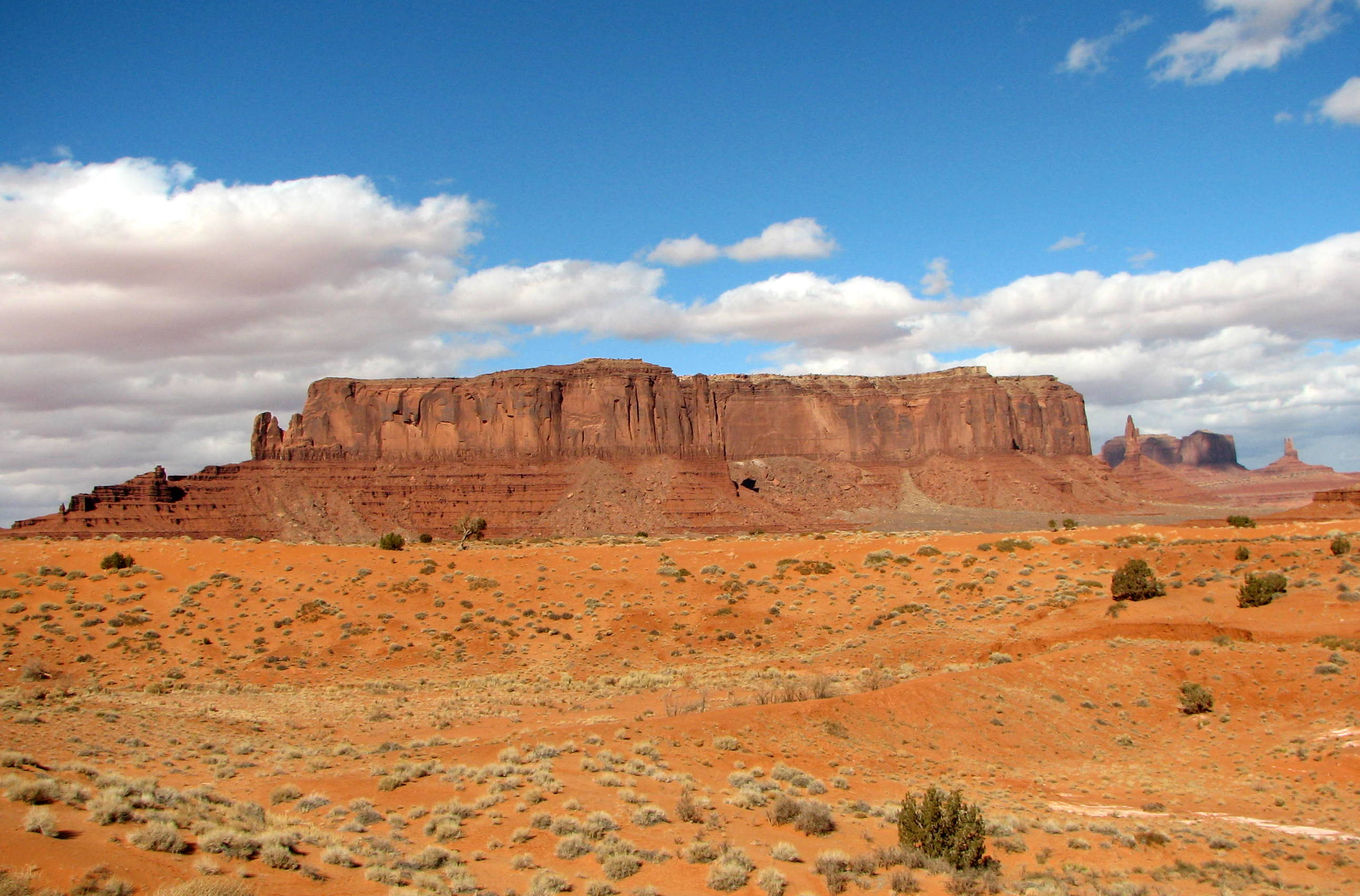
- South aspect

Highest point
- Elevation: 6,450 ft (1,966 m)
- Prominence: 920 ft (280 m)
- Parent peak: Mitchell Mesa (6,586 ft)
- Isolation: 2 5/8 mi (4.2 km)
- Coordinates: 37°00′41″N 110°06′16″W

Geography
- Location within Utah Location within the United States
- Location: Navajo Reservation; San Juan County, Utah, U.S.
- Parent range: Colorado Plateau
- Topo map: USGS Monument Pass

Geology
- Mountain type: Mesa
- Rock type: Sandstone

Climbing
- Easiest route: class 5.x climbing

Sentinel Mesa is a 6,450-foot-elevation (1,966-meter) summit in San Juan County, Utah, United States. It is situated 1 1/2 miles (2.5 kilometers) north of the Monument Valley visitor center on Navajo Nation land and can be seen from Highway 163. The mesa is immediately northwest of the iconic West and East Mitten Buttes. The nearest higher neighbor is Brighams Tomb, 2 5/8 miles (4.2 km) to the north-northeast. Precipitation runoff from this mesa's west slope drains to Mitchell Butte Wash, whereas the east slope drains to West Gypsum Creek, which are both part of the San Juan River drainage basin. The "Sentinel" name refers to how the mesa oversees Monument Valley which the Navajo consider as one of the "door posts" to Monument Valley. The landform's toponym has been officially adopted by the U.S. Board on Geographic Names.

== Geology ==
Sentinel Mesa is a mesa composed of three principal strata. The bottom layer is Organ Rock Shale, the next stratum is De Chelly Sandstone, and the upper layer is Moenkopi Formation capped by Shinarump Conglomerate. The rock ranges in age from Permian at the bottom to Late Triassic at the top. The buttes and mesas of Monument Valley are the result of the Organ Rock Shale being more easily eroded than the overlaying sandstone.

== Climate ==
Spring and fall are the most favorable seasons to visit Sentinel Mesa. According to the Köppen climate classification system, it is located in a semi-arid climate zone with cold winters and hot summers. Summers average 54 days above 90 °F (32 °C) annually, and highs rarely exceed 100 °F (38 °C). Summer nights are comfortably cool, and temperatures drop quickly after sunset. Winters are cold, but daytime highs are usually above freezing. Winter temperatures below 0 °F (−18 °C) are uncommon, though possible. This desert climate receives less than 10 inches (250 millimeters) of annual rainfall, and snowfall is generally light during the winter.

== Gallery ==
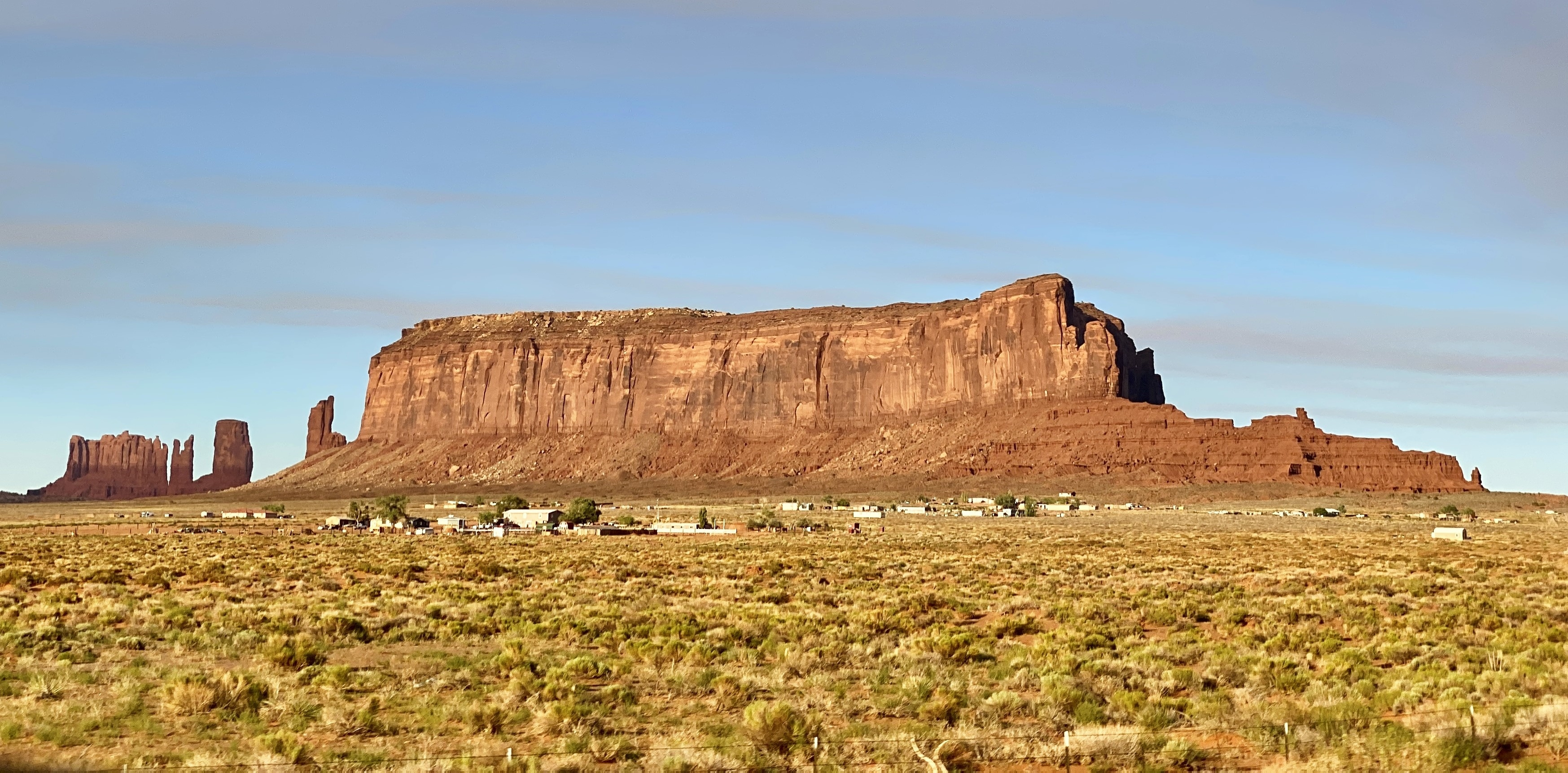
West aspect

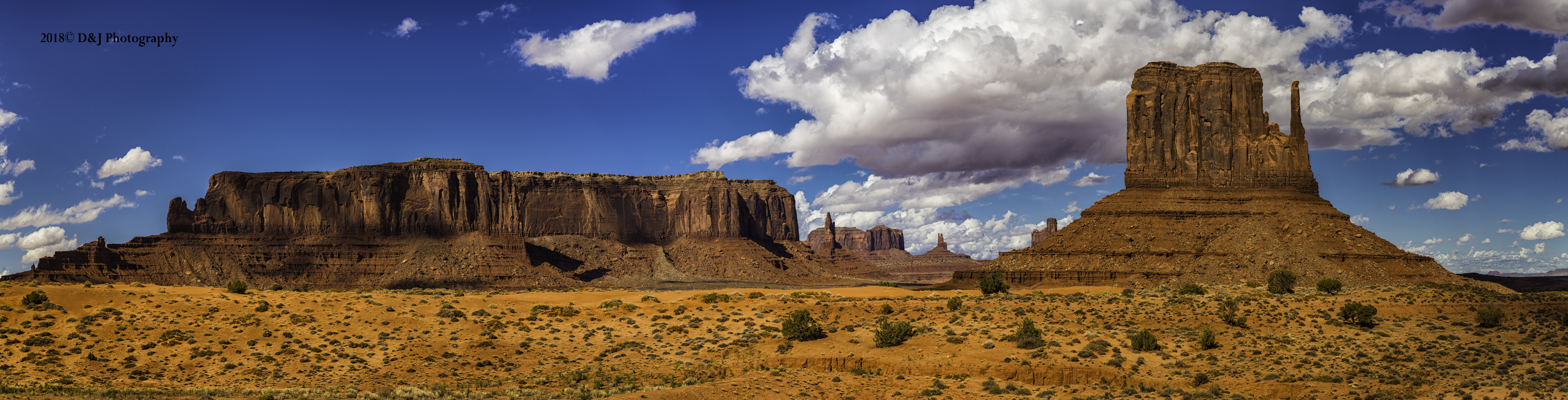
Sentinel Mesa (left) and West Mitten Butte (right)

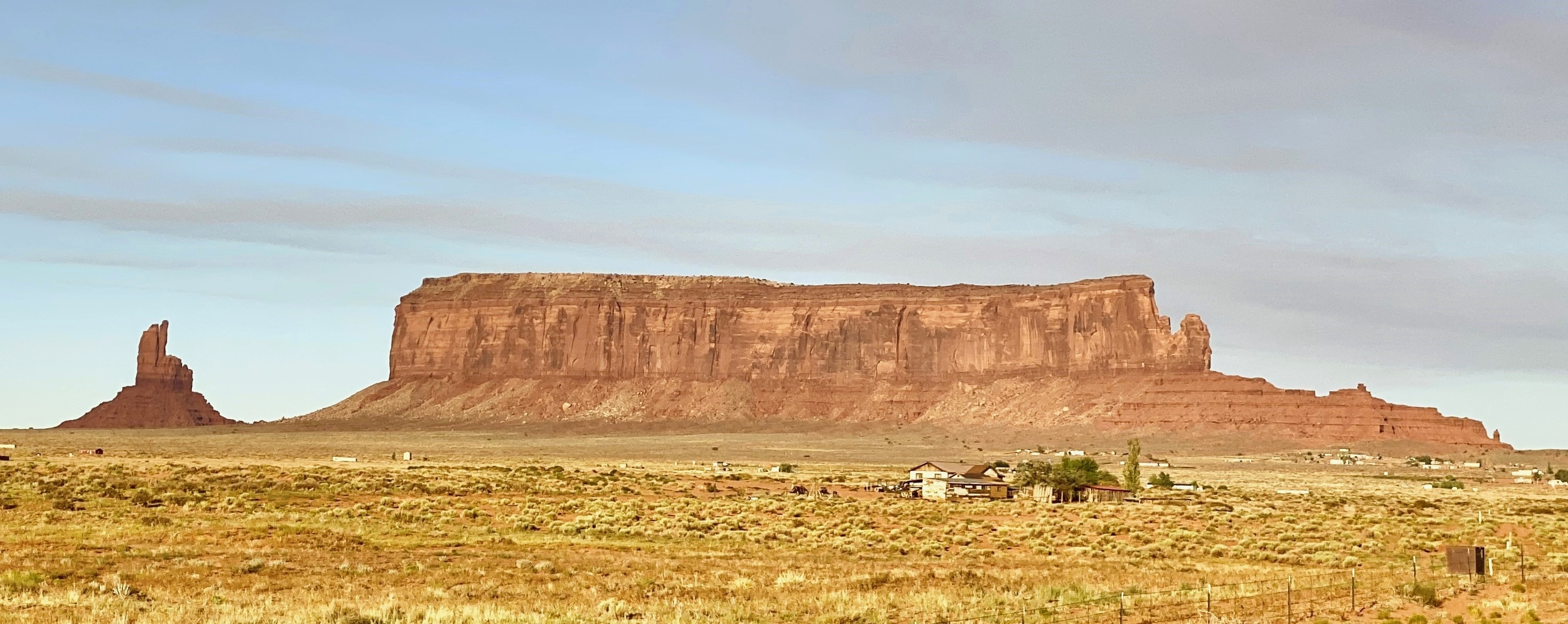
West aspect of Sentinel Mesa, with Big Indian to left

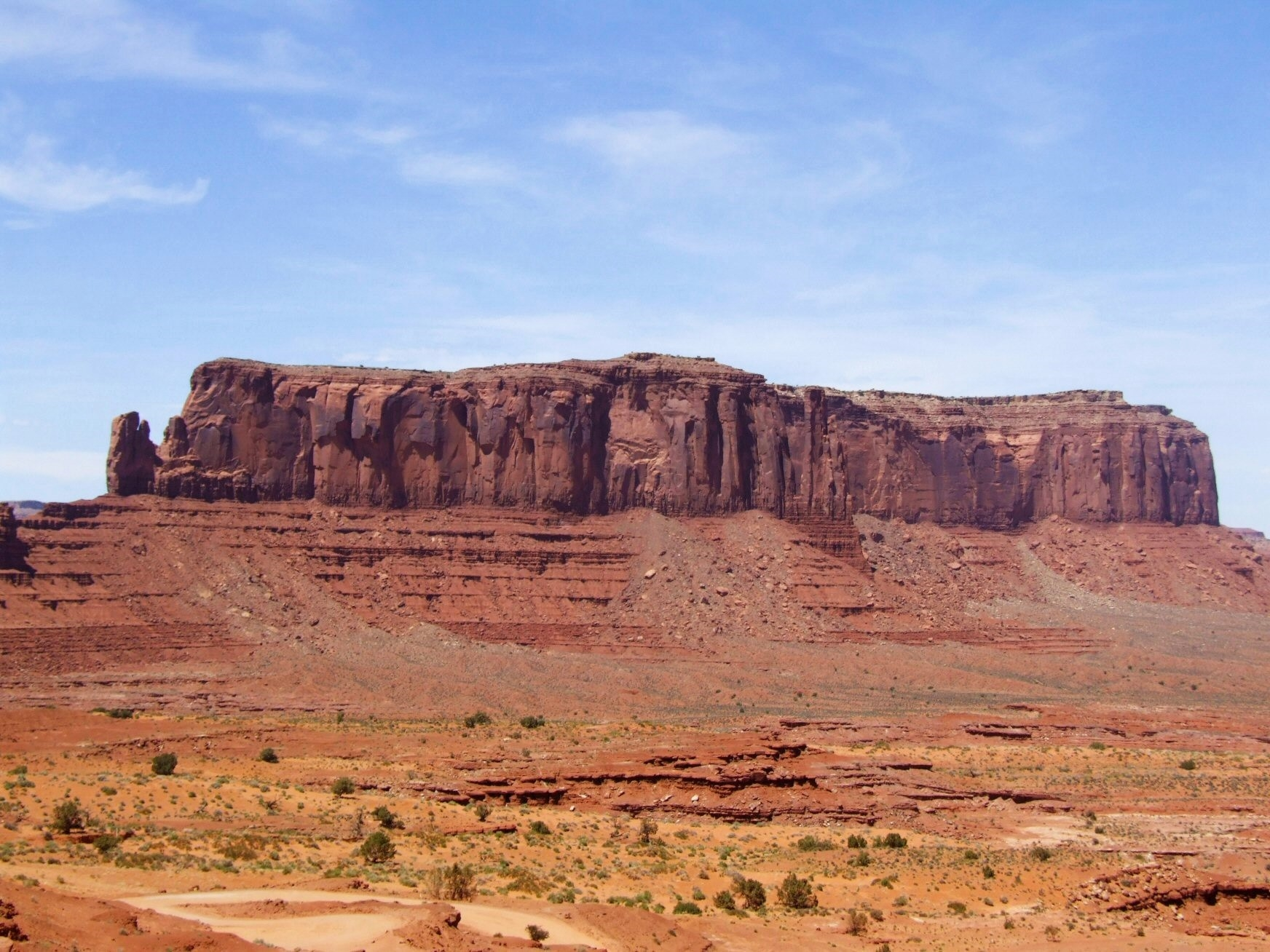
South aspect viewed from Monument Valley Visitors Center

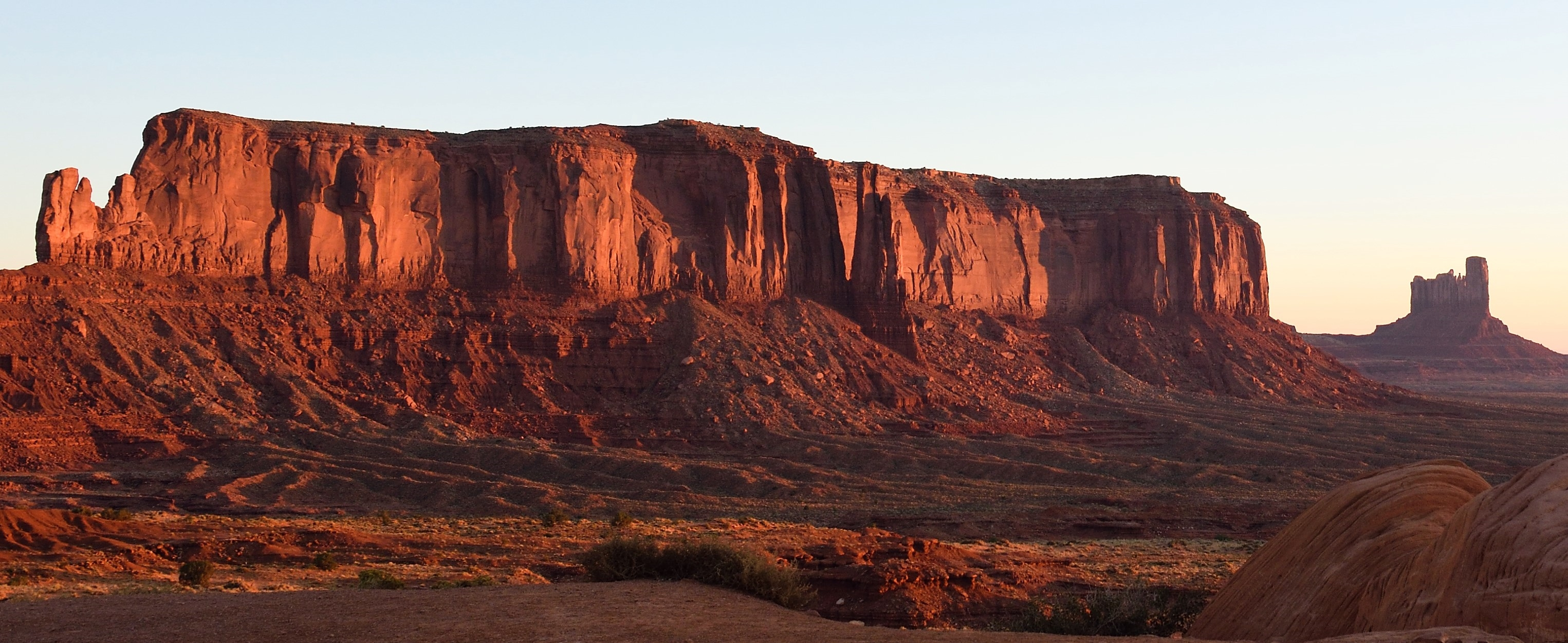
Sunrise on Sentinel Mesa

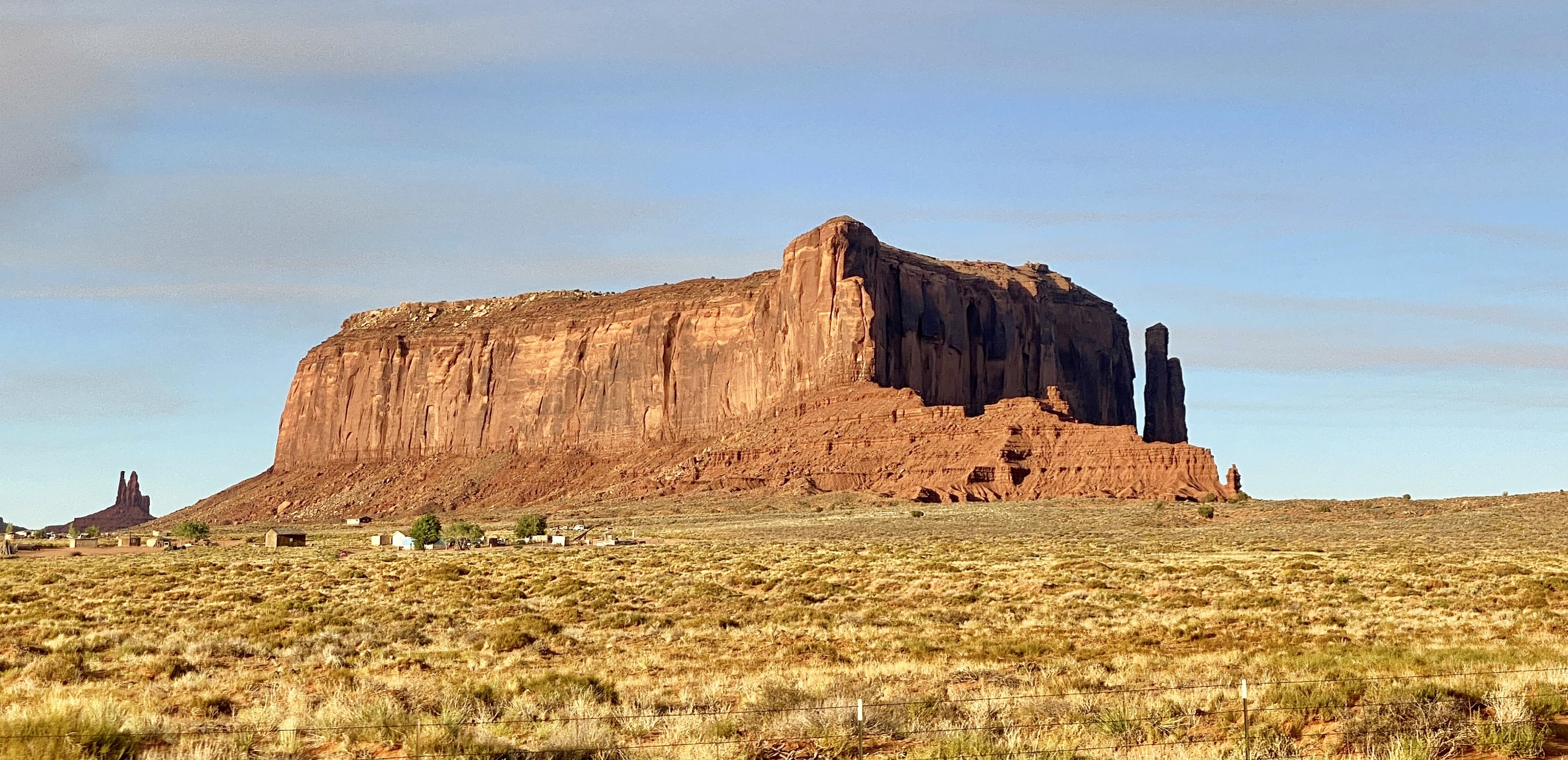
Southwest aspect

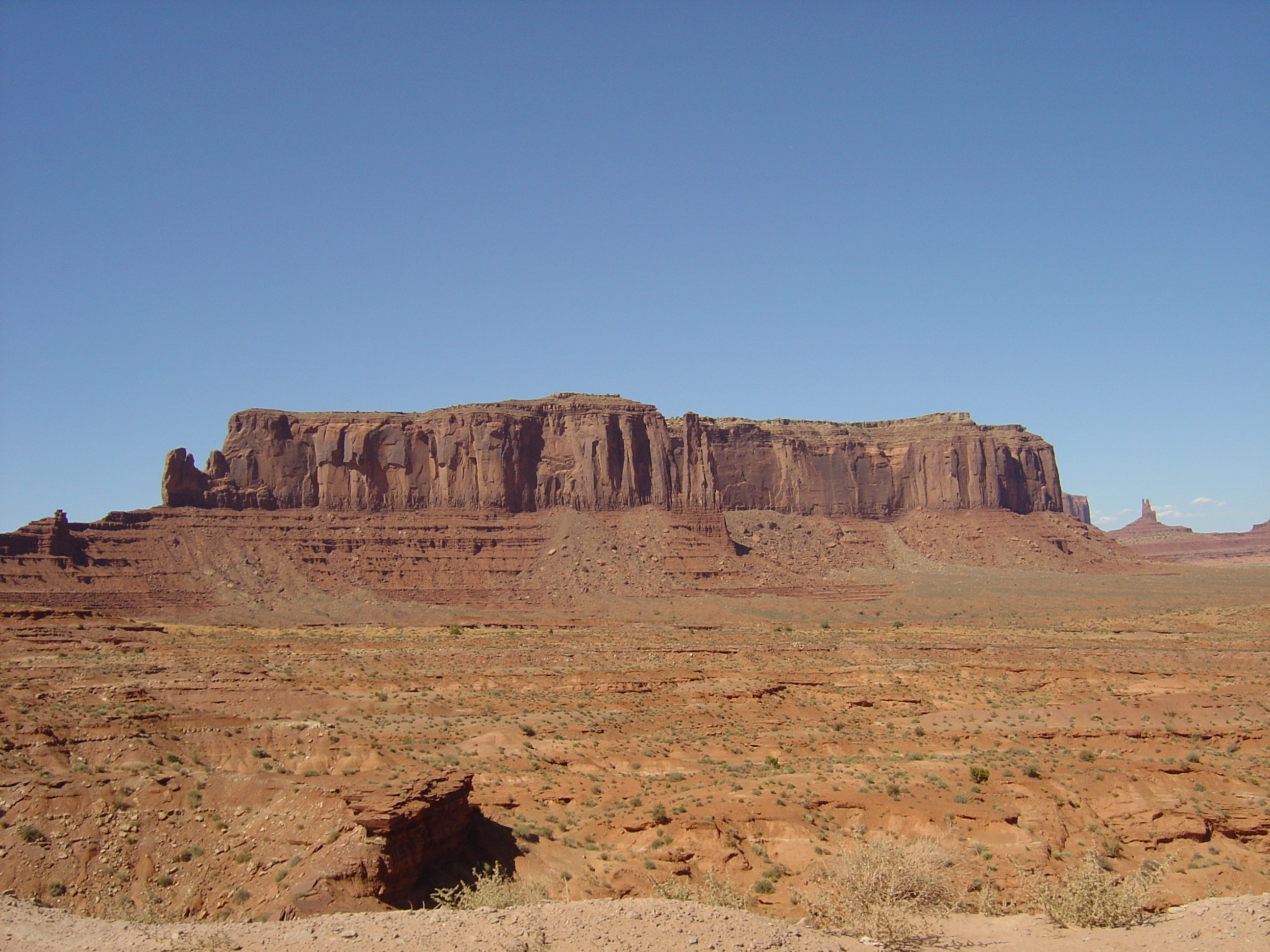
South aspect

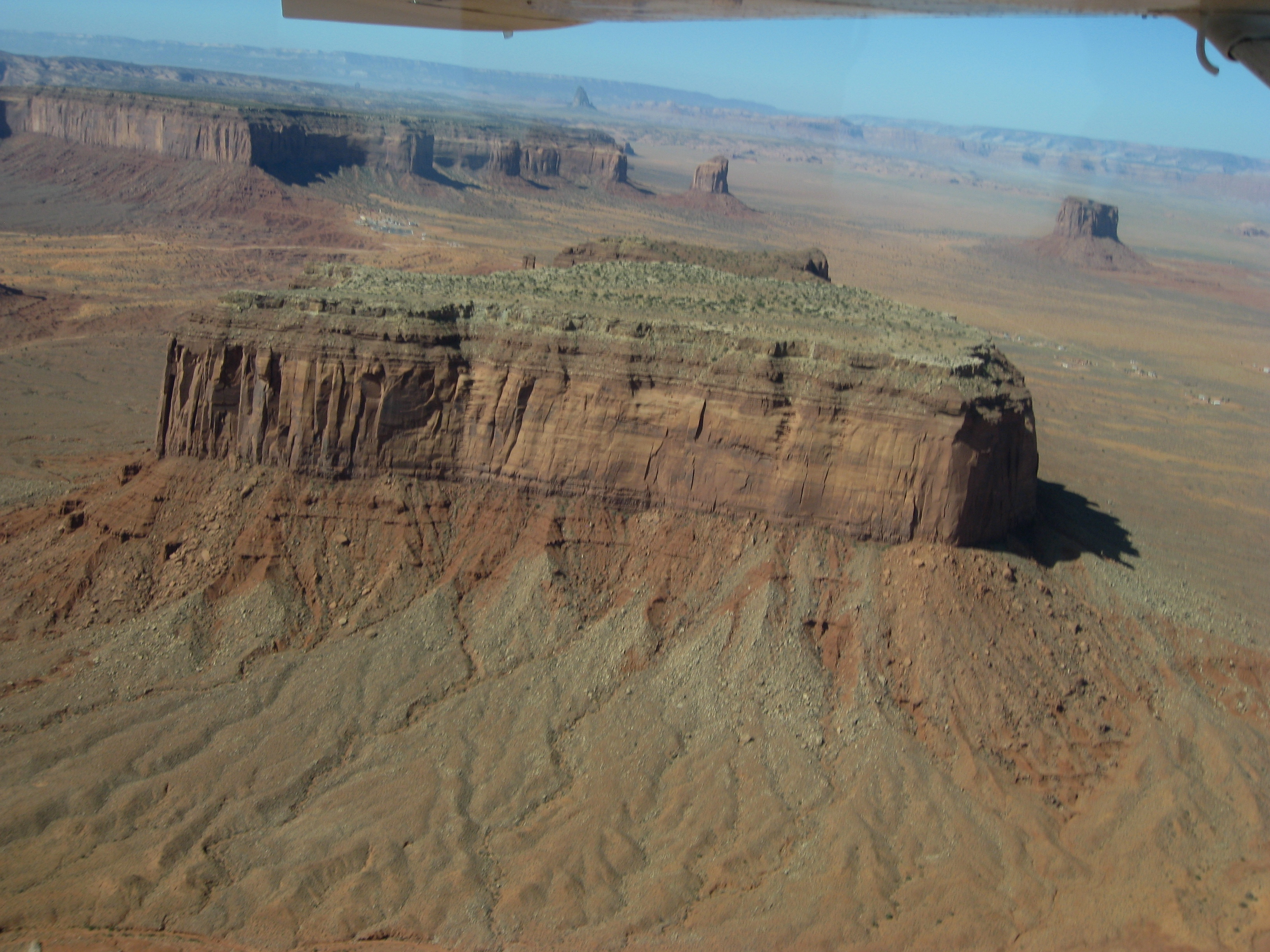
Aerial view, northeast aspect

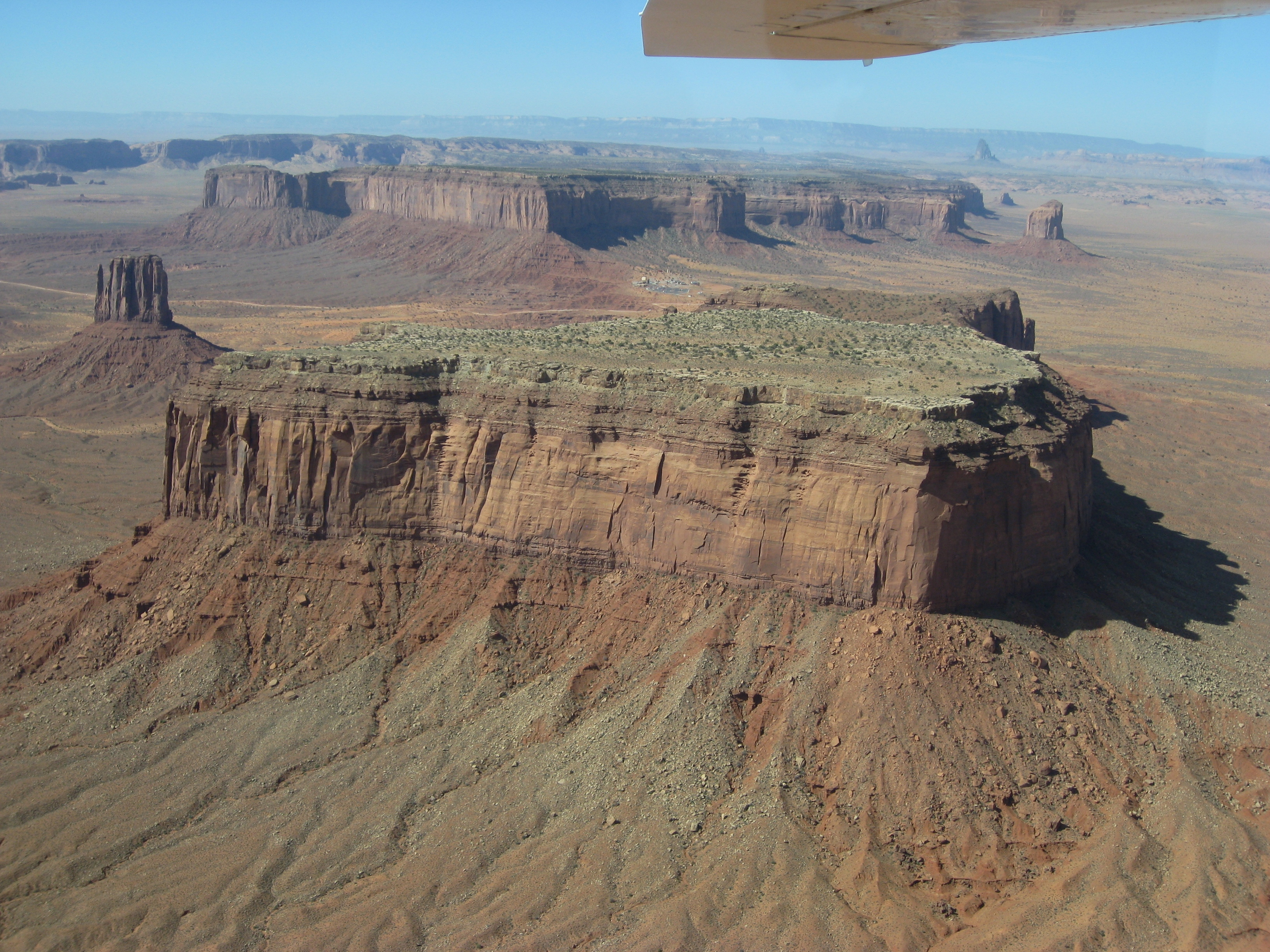
Aerial view, north aspect

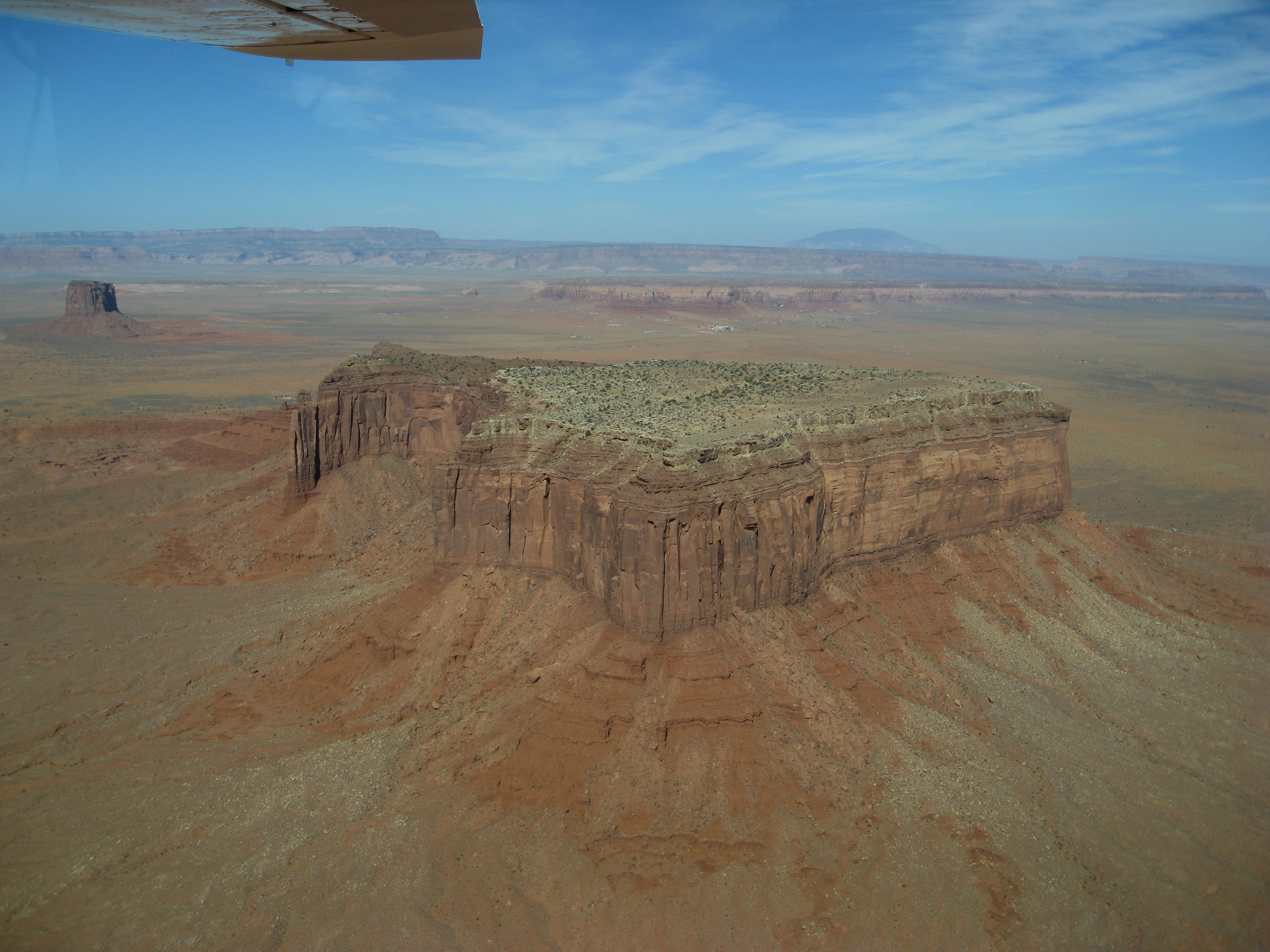
Aerial view, east aspect

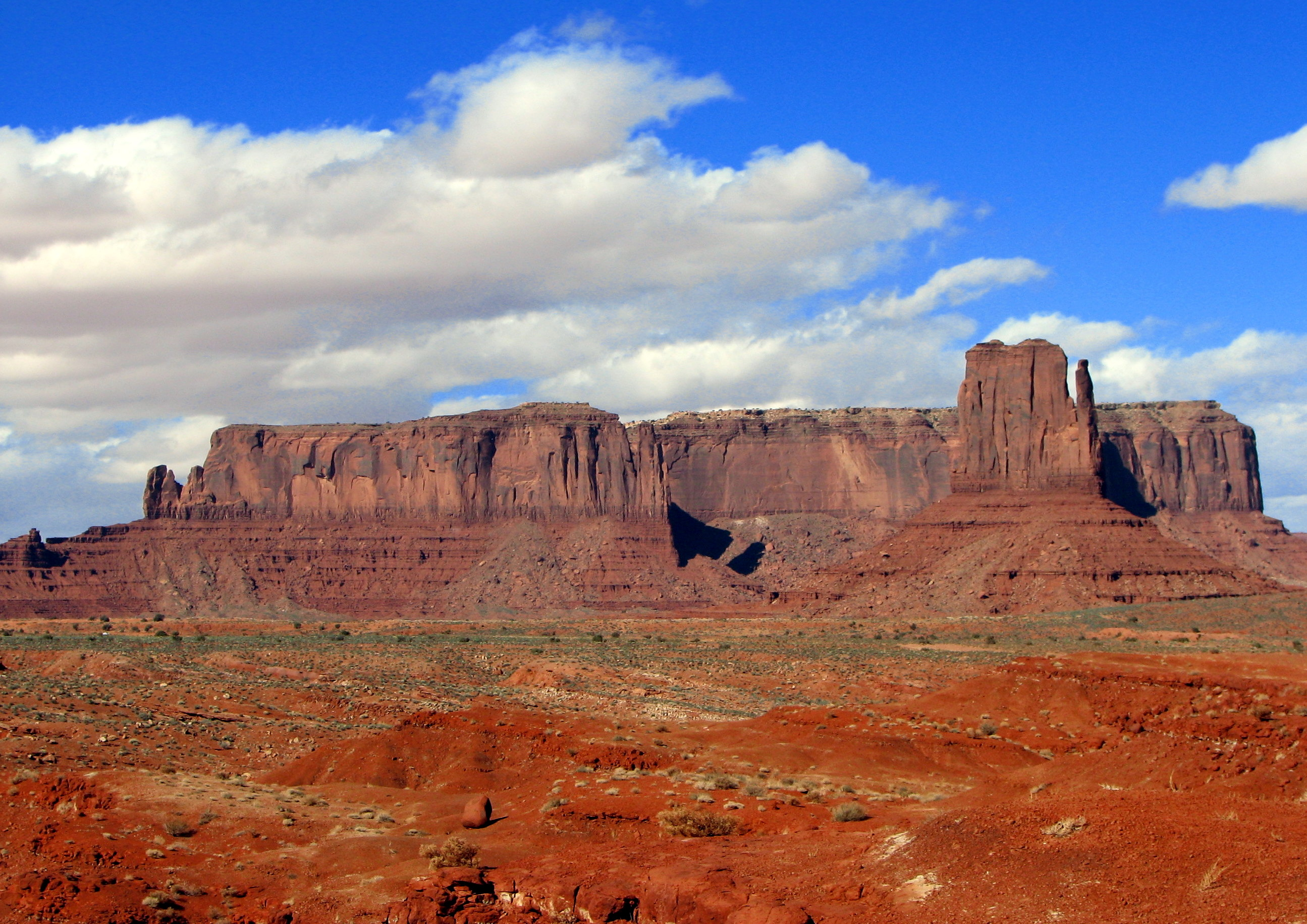
Sentinel Mesa and West Mitten Butte

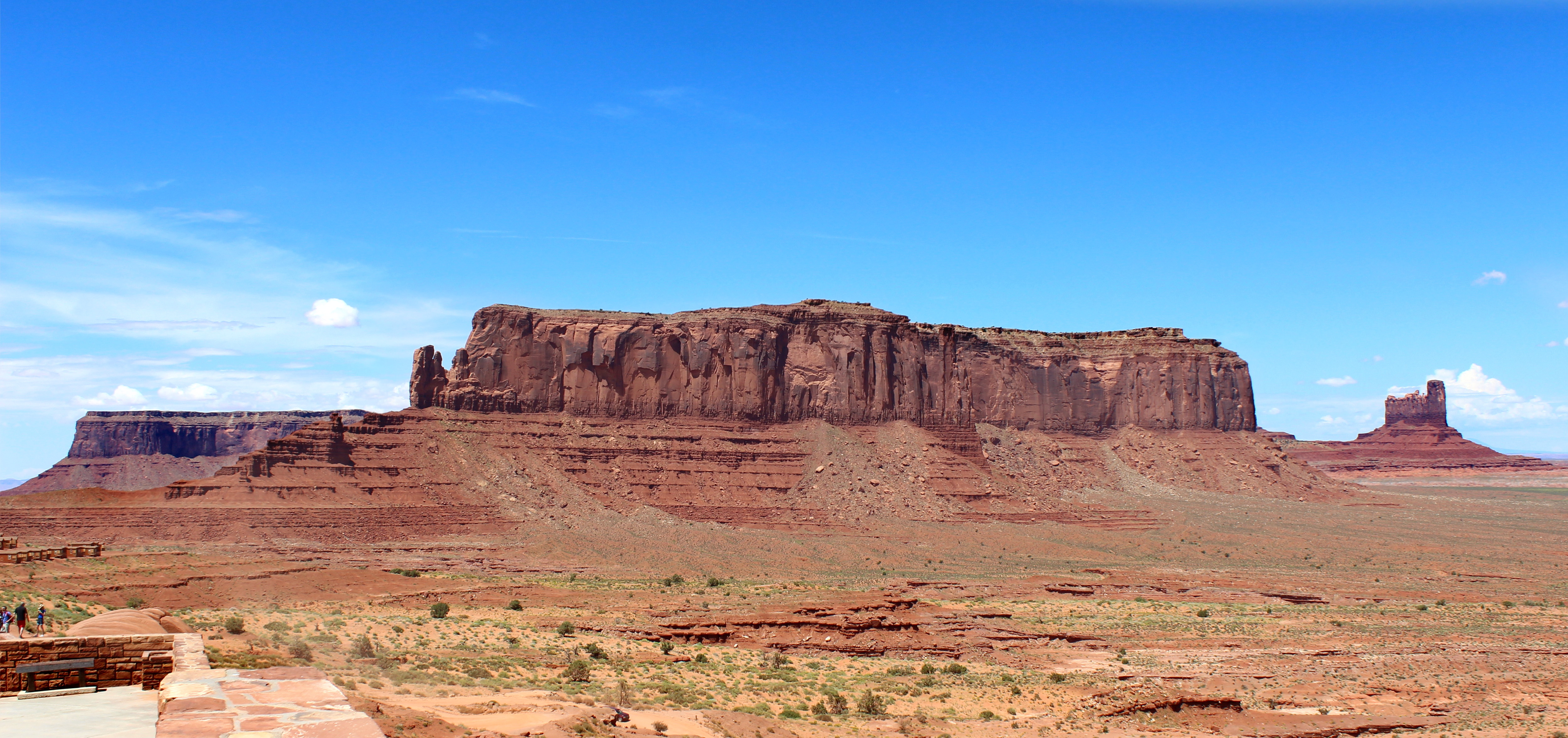
South aspect viewed from Monument Valley Visitors Center

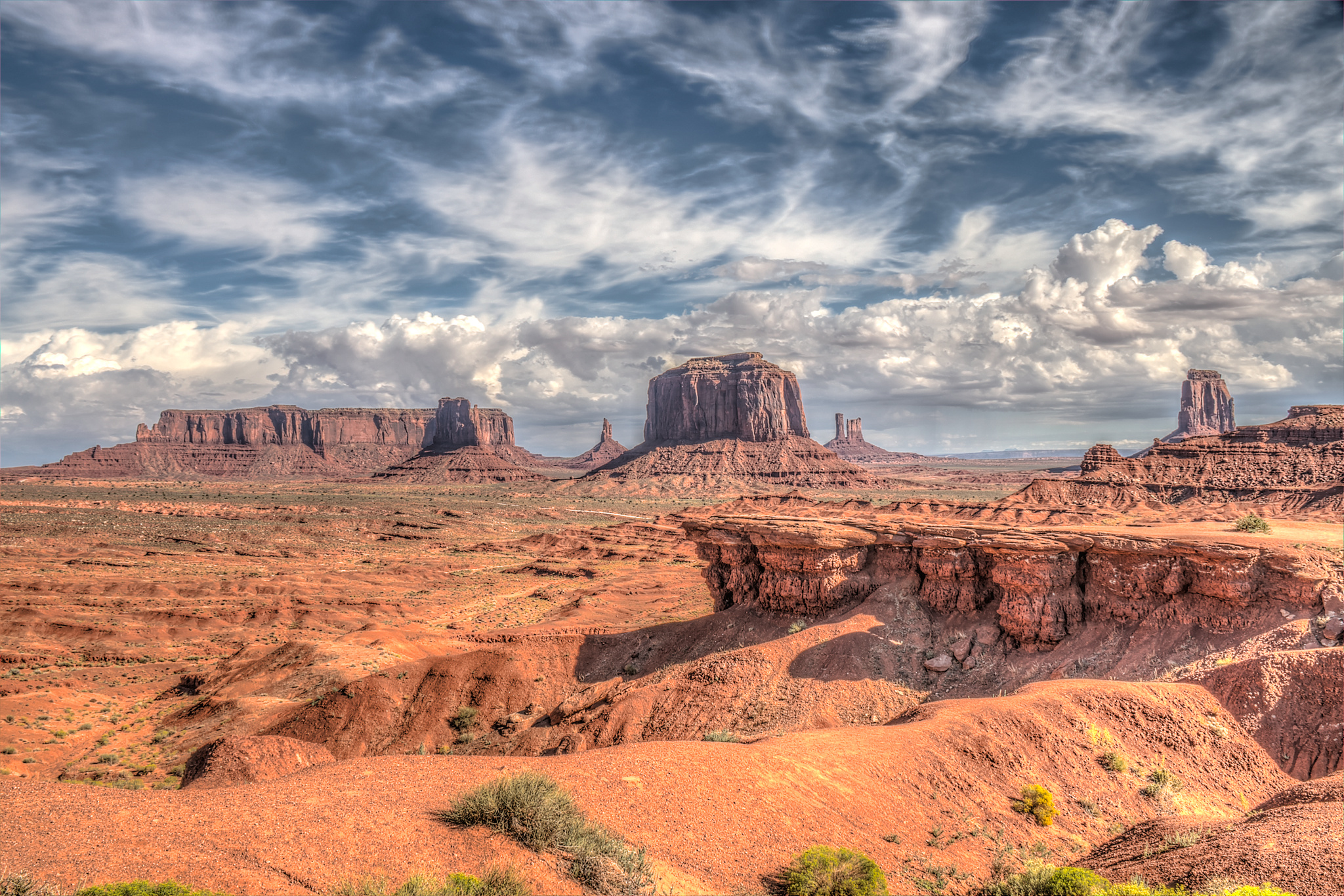
Sentinel Mesa (left) viewed from John Ford Point

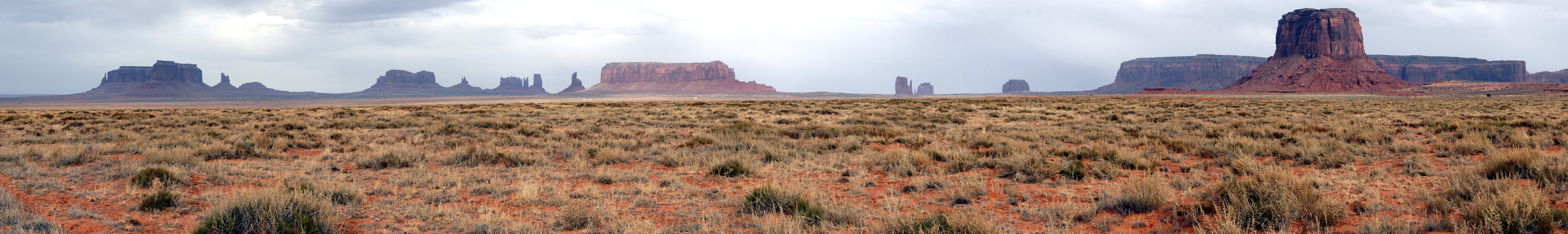
Sentinel Mesa centered in the distance

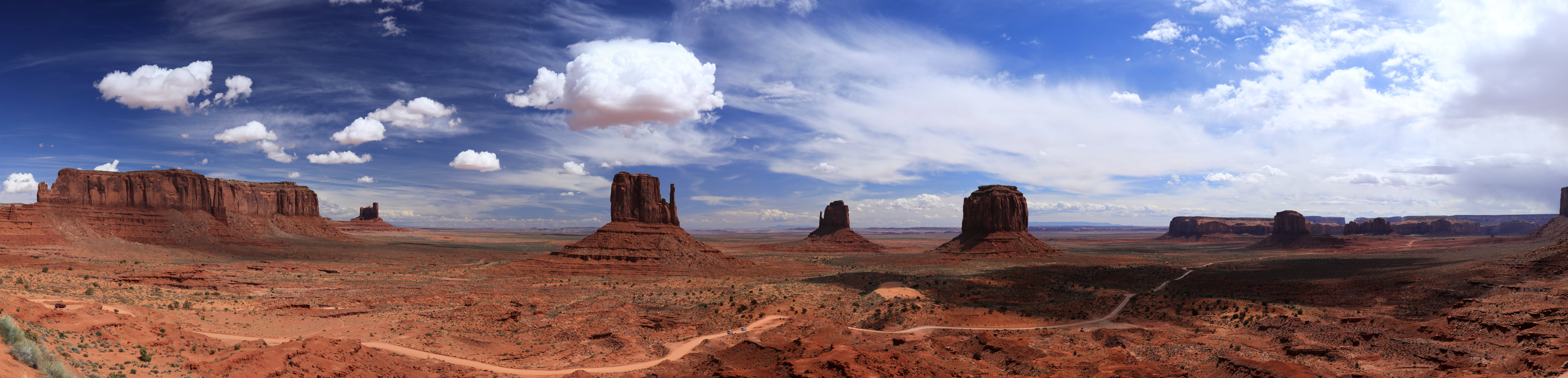
Sentinel Mesa to the left

== See also ==
- List of appearances of Monument Valley in the media
