= Guard (surname) =

Guard is a surname. Notable people with the surname include:

- Betty Guard (1814–1870), early New Zealand settler and wife of John Guard
- Christopher Guard (born 1953), English actor
- Dave Guard (1934–1991), American folk singer and songwriter, founding member of The Kingston Trio
- Dominic Guard (born 1956), English actor
- Jeremy Guard (born 1970), Australian rules footballer
- John 'Jacky' Guard (1791/92–1857), English convict, early New Zealand settler, whaler and husband of Betty Guard
- Kelly Guard (born 1983), Canadian ice hockey player
- Philip Guard (born 1928), English actor
- Pippa Guard (born 1952), British actress
- Rick Guard, English singer-songwriter
