= Sentinel, California =

Sentinel
- Former settlement
- Location in California
- Coordinates: 36°57′51″N 119°29′34″W
- Country: United States
- State: California
- County: Fresno
- Elevation: 843 ft (257 m)

Sentinel is a former settlement in Fresno County, California, United States. It was located 2.5 miles (4 km) west of Humphreys Station, at an elevation of 843 feet (257 m). It still appeared on maps as of 1924.

A post office operated at Sentinel from 1880 to 1883, from 1888 to 1897, and from 1905 to 1910.
