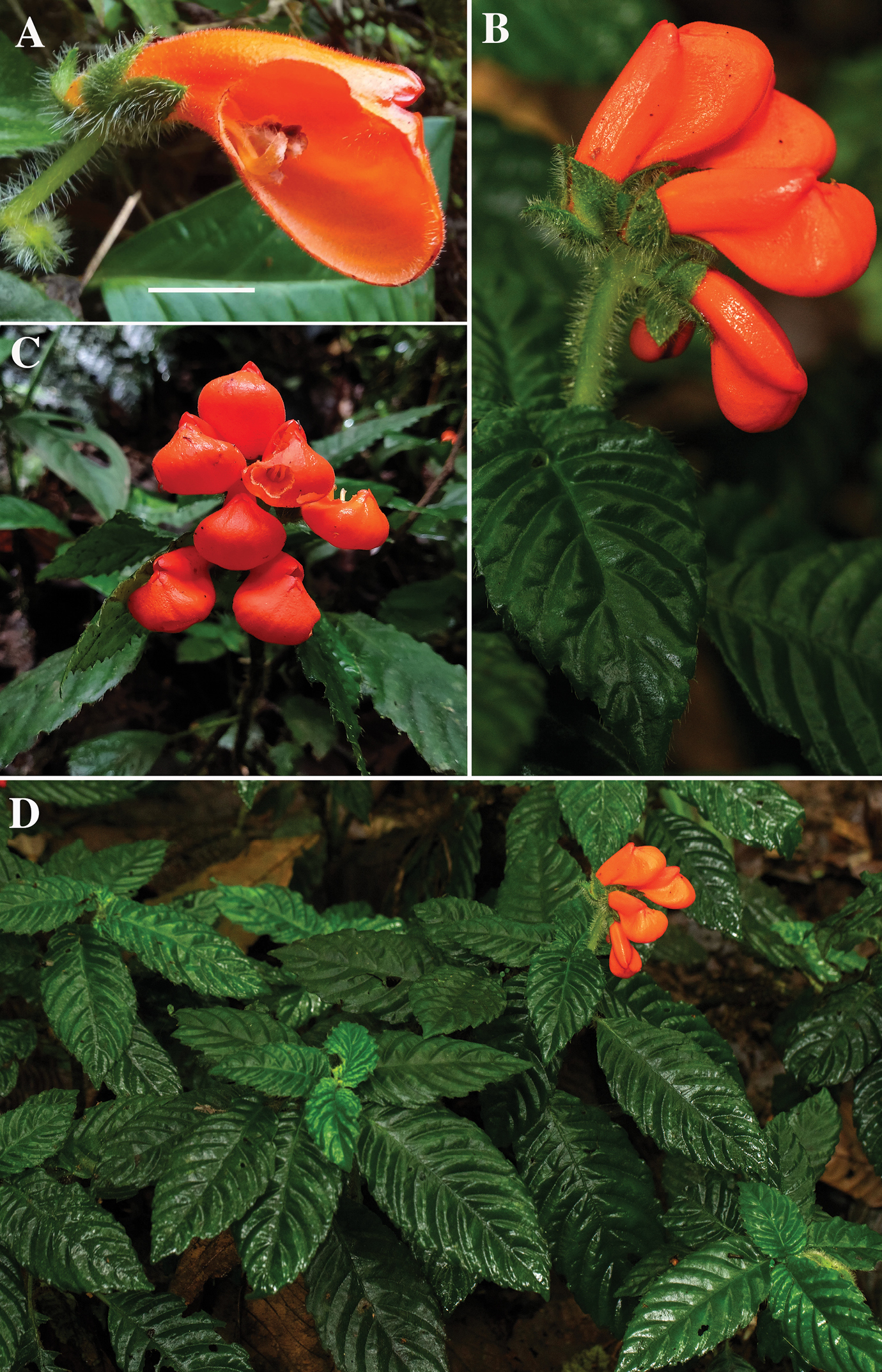

Conservation status
- Critically Endangered (IUCN 3.1)

Scientific classification
- Kingdom: Plantae
- Clade: Tracheophytes
- Clade: Angiosperms
- Clade: Eudicots
- Clade: Asterids
- Order: Lamiales
- Family: Gesneriaceae
- Genus: Gasteranthus
- Species: G. extinctus

Binomial name
- Gasteranthus extinctus L.E.Skog & L.P.Kvist

= Gasteranthus extinctus =

Species of flowering plant

Gasteranthus extinctus is a species of flowering plant in the family Gesneriaceae. It is endemic to Ecuador. Its natural habitat is subtropical or tropical moist montane forests. The species is a small herb that produces bright orange flowers that gave rise to the genus name Gasteranthus ("belly flower").

== Conservation ==
Gasteranthus extinctus was declared extinct after large areas of the rainforest where it occurred were cleared for farmland. On 15 April 2022, the plant was rediscovered in the foothills of the Andes mountains, and in patches of cloud forest in the Centinela region of Ecuador, almost 40 years after it was last sighted. G. extinctus was subsequently reclassified as critically endangered.
