= The Watchman (Grubb novel) =

Novel by Davis Grubb

- First edition (publ. Scribners)
- Author: Davis Grubb
- Language: English
- Publisher: Charles Scribner's Sons
- Publication date: 1961
- OCLC: 284619
- LC Class: PZ4.G884 Wat

The Watchman is a 1961 novel by American author Davis Grubb.

== Story line and development ==
The novel, set in the town of Adena, West Virginia concerns the dark family secret of Sheriff Luther Alt, and his daughters Jill and Chris. When Cole Blake is murdered, events get out of hand.

== Editions ==
- Charles Scribner's Sons, 1961. This was Grubb's second novel for Scribner's

== Reviews ==
Louis Grubb in his preface to You Never Believe Me quotes Time Magazine's review of the novel: "The latest of the author's marrow chilling tales of good and evil—a mixture of poetic rage against cruelty in man, a song of praise of physical love, a cry of despair at the blows dealt to the innocent young".
