= Sentinel (FBI) =

Law enforcement software

Sentinel is a software case management system developed by the Federal Bureau of Investigation (FBI) with the aim to replace digital and paper processes with purely digital workflows during investigations. There was a previous failed project called Virtual Case File.

The project started in 2006 with a $425 million budget. After several delays, new leadership, a slightly bigger budget, and adoption of agile software development method, Sentinel was completed under budget and was in use agency-wide on July 1, 2012.

An audit of the program in 2014, two years after completion, revealed ongoing issues with Sentinel's search function, with only 42 percent of surveyed FBI employees indicating that they often found results they needed. In spite of this, the audit was broadly positive, and found that most FBI employees reported that Sentinel enhanced their ability to enter and share case information.
