= Laurence Skog =

American botanist (born 1943)

- Born: April 9, 1943; Duluth, Minnesota
- Education: University of Connecticut; Cornell University
- Spouse: Judith E. Troop (1968-)
- Children: 1
- Scientific career
- Fields: Botany
- Workplaces: Smithsonian Institution
- Author abbrev. (botany): L.E.Skog

Laurence Edgar Skog (born April 9, 1943) is an American botanist who specializes in the flowering plant family Gesneriaceae.

After graduating in from Cornell University in 1972, Skog studied in Europe and the UK. In 1973, Skog joined the Smithsonian Institution's Department of Botany. He was a curator and researcher there until his retirement in 2003.

== Life ==
Laurence Edgar Skog was born on April 9, 1943, in Duluth, Minnesota, the oldest of four children.

Skog married Judith E. Troop, a fellow botanist, in 1968. In 1972, they moved to Virginia. Their son, Jeremy Owen, was born in 1980.

== Education ==
Skog was a graduate of the University of Minnesota at Duluth from where he received a Bachelor of Arts in botany with a minor in chemistry in 1965. In 1968, Skog earned a Master of Science in botany at the University of Connecticut at Storrs. His thesis was on the Coriaria.

Skog earned a PhD in plant taxonomy from Cornell University in 1972.

== Career ==
In the 1960s, Skog was awarded a Horticultural Interchange Fellowship from the Royal Botanic Garden Edinburgh. Skog studied in Europe and the United Kingdom until 1969, when he returned to Ithaca, New York.

Skog served on the board of the International Association for Plant Taxonomy. He is a fellow of the Linnean Society of London. From 1993 to 1996, Skog was secretary of the Organization for Flora Neotropica.

=== Smithsonian Institution ===
From 1972 to 1973, Skog worked at the Smithsonian Institution's Department of Botany. He briefly worked at the United States Department of Agriculture, before accepting a curatorial position at the Smithsonian Institution. From 1987 to 1992, Skog was chair of the Smithsonian's Department of Botany. Skog was a curator and research scientist at the institution until his retirement in 2003.

=== As Professor ===
Skog is an adjunct Professor at George Mason University. He was an honorary professor at the Institute of Botany, Chinese Academy of Sciences.
