= Städtische Galerie im Park Viersen =

Coordinates: 51°15′30″N 6°23′29″E

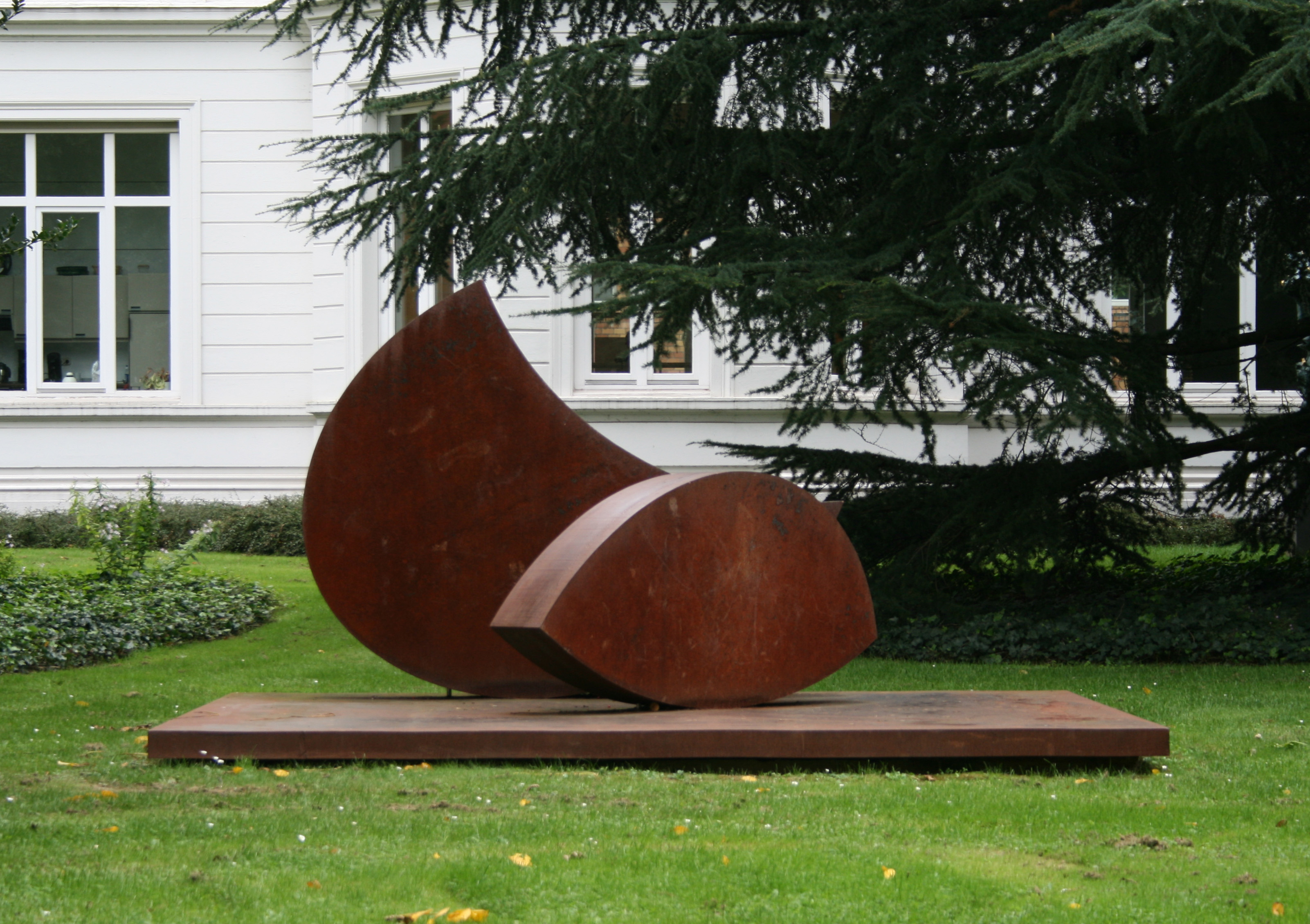
The sculpture Position im Schwerpunkt i.e. In the center of gravity by Wolfgang Nestler in front of the building

Städtische Galerie im Park Viersen, North Rhine-Westphalia

Städtische Galerie im Park Viersen is the municipal art gallery of Viersen in North Rhine-Westphalia, Germany. It has a collection of graphic reproductions. The gallery is located in an old town house, surrounded by a park with huge old trees housing the Viersen sculpture collection.

== The building ==
The building was constructed in 1869 as representative neo-renaissance townhouse and became the property of the firm Kaisers Kaffeegeschäft in 1899, who had its headquarters in Viersen. Since 1973 this fine villa belongs to the city of Viersen. In 1976 it became listed as important example of the architecture of its time, in 1980 it was moderately remodeled for use as an art gallery, which opened up in 1981 as Städtische Galerie im Park for exhibitions as well as other cultural events. It is located right in the centre of town close to a new group of buildings housing the district administration, the so-called Forum and the central bus station.

== The collections ==
The Galerie im Park houses several collections, one of which is the important collection already started in the beginning of the sixties by the then head of the cities administrative staff van Kaldenkerken called Grafische Sammlung i.e. graphic collection. To the now more than 1000 pieces dating from the end of the 15th century to the present time belong precious works f. i. by Rembrandt, Rubens and Albrecht Dürer, but also by Marc Chagall, Picasso (La Poule), Braque, Fernand Léger and Joan Miró, graphic works of German Expressionists such as Lyonel Feininger, Kokoschka, Paul Klee and Emil Nolde, a collection of Rhenish artists as well as of contemporary art bought on the occasion of exhibitions by the artists in the gallery. 40 photographs by the famous Rhenish photographer August Sander belong to the collection too.

== The exhibitions ==
The high quality of the exhibitions taking place several times a year attracts visitors from the lower Rhine area as well as the Netherlands. The first exhibition in 1981 showed works by the realist painter Dieter Asmus, followed by ones showing diverse styles up to kinetic art by Günter Haese (2007). The most outstanding artists whose exhibitions where often accompanied by special publications, were for example Christoph Meckel (1987), Hermann Schmitz (1987), Henry Moore (1989), Erwin Heerich (1990), Tony Cragg (1996), Lothar-Günther Buchheim (1997), Anatol (2002), Roberto Matta (2002), Georg Ettl (2003), Ewald Mataré (2004), ZEBRA (2005), Martin Lersch (2006), Günter Haese (2007) and Wang Du (2010).

== Other activities ==
Besides readings by authors and concerts the municipal gallery offers an educational program with guided tours for schools and other groups. A special event is always the guided snoop-tour at lunch time on the first Tuesday of each month, which casts a spotlight on a few chosen objects of the current exhibition.

== Secondary literature ==
- Werner Mellen: Städtische Galerie im Park Viersen. Die wechselvolle Geschichte des Hauses. In: Albert Pauly (editor). Viersen – Beiträge zu einer Stadt. Vol. 4. Viersen 1983
- Angelika Pack, Helmut Heißenbüttel: 10 Jahre Städtische Galerie im Park Viersen. Kulturamt der Stadt Viersen 1992
- Jutta Pitzen: Die Graphische Sammlung der Stadt Viersen. Vol. 1-4. Editor: Stadt Viersen, Fachbereich Schule, Kultur und Sport. Viersen 1996/97
