= Süchteln =

- Borough of Viersen
- Interactive map of Süchteln
- Location within Germany Location within North Rhine-Westphalia
- Coordinates: 51°17′N 6°23′E
- Country: Germany
- State: North Rhine-Westphalia
- District: Viersen
- Town: Viersen

Area
  - Total: 22.76 km^{2} (8.79 sq mi)
- Elevation: 35 m (115 ft)

Population (2020)
  - Total: 15,941
  - Density: 700.4/km^{2} (1,814/sq mi)
- Time zone: UTC+01:00 (CET)
  - Summer (DST): UTC+02:00 (CEST)
- Postal codes: 41749
- Dialling codes: 02162

Süchteln (German pronunciation: [ˈzʏçtl̩n]) is a borough (Stadtbezirk) of Viersen, a town which is the centre of the Kreis of Viersen in North Rhine-Westphalia, Germany.

Süchteln was formerly an independent town; the Catholic parish church of St Clement is at its centre. The church was built in 1481 and has a well preserved tower 73 metres tall.

== History ==
The first mention of the settlement of Süchteln was in 1116, in the books of the Abbey of St. Pantaleon in Cologne. It was granted the right to hold a market in 1423, when it belonged to the Duchy of Jülich. It has been chartered as a town since 1405. There was a celebration of "600 Years of Town Privileges in Süchteln" (600 Jahre Stadtrechte Süchteln) in 2005. The original document with the official seal of Süchteln is in the National Archives of France in Paris.

From the end of the 19th century until the end of the 1950s, Süchteln was a flourishing centre of the textile industry.

In 1970, the city of Süchteln combined with Viersen, Dülken and Boisheim to form the modern city of Viersen.

== Local culture ==
Irmgard of Süchteln is the patron saint of Süchteln; the annual Irmgardisoktav (Irmgard Week) is held in her honour on the Heiligenberg, part of the Süchtelner Höhen (Süchteln Heights), which are the highest part of Viersen and where there is a chapel dedicated to her.

Among other things, Süchteln is known for the LVR-Klinik Viersen, which is located there. This is a clinic operated by the Landschaftsverband Rheinland which includes the nationally known Rheinische Klinik für Orthopädie (Rhenish Orthopaedic Clinic) and also several psychiatric clinics (including paediatric and adolescent psychiatry), a forensic clinic, a clinic for the treatment of addiction, a gerontological institution, ergonomic and occupational therapy and an institute for clinical training.

== Noteworthy residents ==
=== Born in Süchteln ===
- Matthias Nethenus (1618–1686), theologian
- Karl Matthias Schiffer (1867–1930), union official and Reichstag member (Centre Party)
- Karl Müller (1884–1964), politician
- Wilhelm van Kempen (1894–1981), art historian
- Albert Vigoleis Thelen (1903–1989), author and translator
- Hermann Schmitz (1904–1931), artist
- Hellmut Trienekens (born 1938), waste disposal entrepreneur
- Thomas Druyen (born 1957), sociologist
- Frank Rehfeld (born 1962), author
- Roland Kothes (born 1967), radio astronomer

=== Associated with Süchteln ===
- Irmgard of Süchteln (circa 1013 - circa 1085), saint who is said to have settled in Süchteln
- Heinrich von Rosenthal (1808–1865), mayor of Süchteln until 1843, then mayor of Kettwig and of Mettmann
- Peter Norrenberg (1847–1894), pastor, historian, and social reformer

== Sources ==
- Joseph Deilmann. Geschichte der Stadt Süchteln. Süchteln: Thelen, 1924. OCLC 72110195
- Walther Föhl. Süchteln, 1558-1958: Eine Festschrift der Stadt. Schriftenreihe des Landkreises Kempen-Krefeld 5. 1958. OCLC 164116215
- Paul Schotes. Viersen-Süchteln. Rheinische Kunststätten 100. Revised ed. Köln Neusser Druckerei und Verlag, 1991. ISBN 3-88094-684-1
- Arbeitsgruppe für Orts- und Heimatgeschichte im Stadtarchiv Viersen. 600 Jahre Stadt Süchteln: Streiflichter. Eigenverlag der Stadt Viersen, 2005. OCLC 70334565
