= Reisen =

Reisen may refer to:

- Rydzyna, Poland, known as Reisen when part of Germany
- A6M Reisen, the Japanese fighter aircraft extensively used in World War II
- Helmut Reisen (born 1950), German economist
- Zalman Reisen (1887–1940), Russian lexicographer of Yiddish
- Reisen Udongein Inaba, a fictional character in Imperishable Night from the Touhou Project franchise
