= Festhalle Viersen =

Multi-purpose hall in Viersen, Germany

Coordinates: 51°15′11″N 6°23′29″E

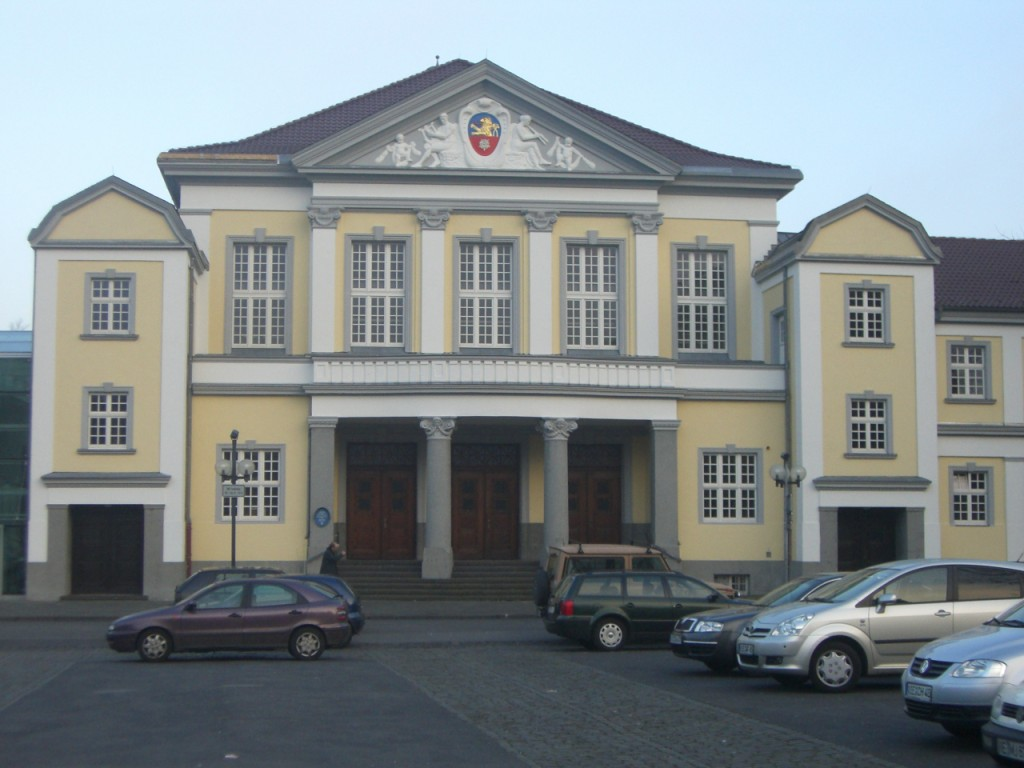
Festival Hall Viersen

The Festhalle Viersen (Festival Hall Viersen) is a performance space in Viersen, a town located in the Lower Rhine region of Germany. It is well known for its theater and concert programme and is also the annual venue of the UMB World Three-cushion Championship of national teams as well as of the annual international Jazz Festival.

== History ==
The Festhalle was completed in 1913 to plans by the municipal architect Eugen Frielingsdorf. The industrialist Josef Kaiser, who had the headquarters of his locally founded company Kaiser's Kaffeegeschäft in Viersen, initiated the construction of the building by donating 130.000 Marks (ℳ) on the occasion of his appointment to royal Kommerzienrat (Councillor of Commerce). Up until 1925 the building was used as projected, as a multipurpose hall, that is as a ballroom and for gymnastics as well as for cultural events. But the gymnastics use was soon dropped. During World War II the festival hall, unlike many other venues in Germany, was luckily only slightly damaged and could soon be used again. It has been renovated and redesigned several times, including in 1939–40 for propaganda purposes of the NSDAP. In 1997, thanks to the efforts of the Festhallen-Förderverein (Friends of the Festival Hall) it was provided with, among other things, new seats and state-of-the-art stagecraft.

== Building ==
The facade shows elements of classicism such as columns, pilasters and triangular pediments. The hall inside the building can seat about a thousand visitors. In 1955 the trade journal Baukunst und Werkform initiated an opinion poll among 20 well known conductors asking for the concert hall with the best acoustics worldwide. For Germany they named two houses, the Bremen concert hall Die Glocke and the Festival Hall Viersen.

== Events ==
Between 1947 and 1949, due to the war damage to other concert halls and the splendid acoustics, the large radio station NWDR, later WDR, recorded and broadcast many symphony concerts in the hall with its own NWDR-Rundfunkorchester as well as radio shows such as Das ideale Brautpaar, legendary in the mid-fifties. The outstanding acoustics drew many internationally well known conductors such as Wilhelm Furtwängler, Thomas Beecham and Ferenc Fricsay, orchestras such as the Berlin Philharmonic conducted by Sergiu Celibidache or Herbert von Karajan and international star soloists such as Gidon Kremer, Lang Lang, Nigel Kennedy and David Garrett to the Festival Hall. Famous theatre companies also used the Festival Hall for their guest performances in the region, such as the Düsseldorfer Schauspielhaus with the famous actor and director Gustaf Gründgens.

== Site ==
The Festival Hall is situated in the centre of the Old Town of Viersen on Hermann-Hülser-Platz.

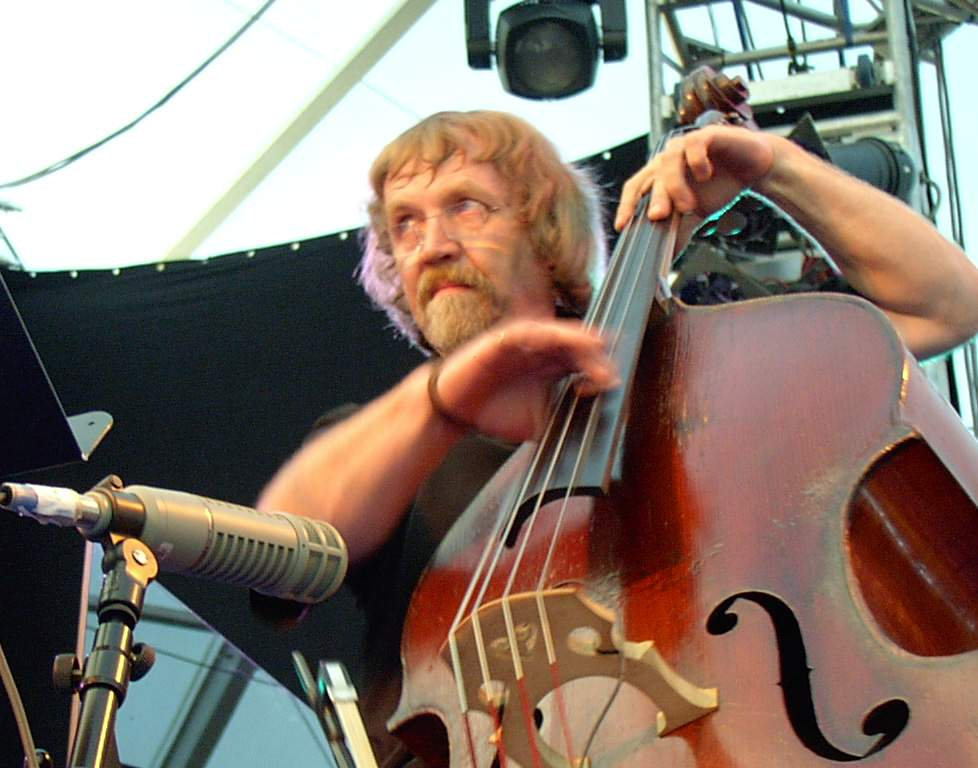
Ali Haurand, Art Director of the Viersen Jazz Festival

== Uses ==
- In addition to concerts and theatre performances the Festival Hall is often used for CD recordings because of the excellent acoustics.
- Since 1990 it has also been the venue of the annual UMB World Three-cushion Championship of national teams.
- The annual international Viersen Jazz Festival draws musicians such as Jan Akkerman, Chick Corea, Charlie Mariano, Joe Zawinul, Billy Cobham, Ron Carter, Chris Potter, Ahmad Jamal, Gonzalo Rubalcaba and Till Brönner.
- The Festival Hall can be booked for private and professional use.
