= Thomas Druyen =

German sociologist

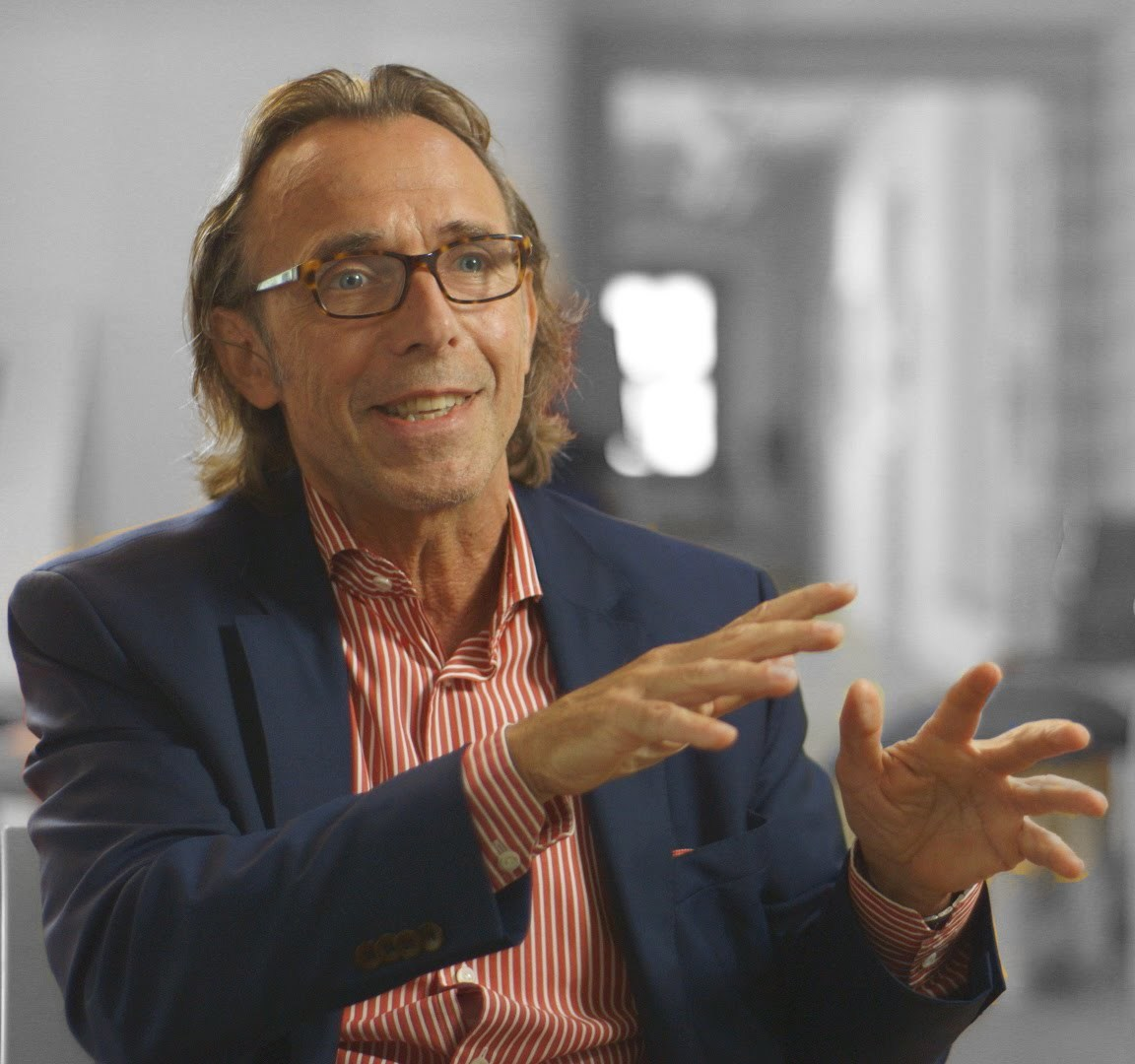
Thomas Druyen (2016)

Thomas Druyen (born July 2, 1957, in Süchteln, now Viersen) is a German sociologist and director of two institutes at the Sigmund Freud Private University in Vienna. In addition to his work as a speaker and author - especially on philosophical and contemporary topics - Druyen focuses his research on the psychological and neural conditions as well as the accompanying phenomena of shaping the future, digitization and demographic change. He also deals with the psychology and life of the wealthy. As one of the most important researchers in wealth research, Druyen is regularly present in various print and audiovisual media.

== Personal life ==
From 1996 to 2013, Druyen was married to actress Jenny Jürgens.

In September 2016 he married Konstanze Bruhns. Druyen lives in Düsseldorf.

== Scientific career ==
Druyen studied law, sociology, media science and philology at the University of Münster, and anthropology at the University of Colombo. He graduated from the University of Münster with a Master of Arts degree in 1988, completed a PhD in 1990 and his postdoctoral qualification in 2004. In the same year, he was appointed honorary professor at the Department of Economic and Social Sciences of the University of Győr. From 1999 to 2004 he was director of the Institute for Dialogue of the Generations. Druyen has been teaching at the Institute of Sociology of the Westfälische Wilhelms-Universität Münster since 2004 and was Director of the Investment Research Forum from 2006 to 2010. He also worked at the Institute for Cultural and Media Management at Freie Universität Berlin from 2005 to 2007.

From 2000 to 2004, Druyen was chairman of the Swiss Peter Ustinov Foundation. From 2001 to 2014, Druyen was president of the board of trustees of the "Dialog der Generationen" foundation in Düsseldorf, founded in 1999 and now dissolved. From 2003 to 2007 he worked for LGT Privatbank in Liechtenstein and was editor-in-chief of the customer magazine "Credo". Likewise, he was chairman of the foundation Kloster Steinfeld from 2004 to 2009. Since 2007, Druyen has been Full Professor of the Chair of Comparative Culture of Wealth and Wealth Psychology and since 2009 Director of the Institute of Wealthibility and Wealth Psychology and the Institute for Future Psychology and Future Management, both at the Sigmund Freud Private University in Vienna.

Druyen is president and CEO of opta data Zukunfts-Stiftung gGmbH, which was founded in 2022. Since May 2024, he has been Chairman of the Future Council of the "Global Goals EXPO Berlin 2035" initiative, which aims to position Berlin as a promising candidate to host the EXPO 2035 world expo.

== Scientific field of research ==
=== Demographic change ===
Druyen counters the generally negative image of age with a positive image. It is important to discover the old age's new potential and exploit the resulting opportunities for the general public. He calls for a corresponding social reassessment of age and, among other things, reveals to what extent the subjective self-perception of many older people fundamentally conflicts with the social fears of aging. His 2003 book "Olympus of life - the new picture of the age" found entrance into numerous public debates, and prepared at the same time the basis for its further research field of the culture of wealth by further developing basic elements from the demographic research and thus reaching an overall social dimension.

=== Wealth research, culture of wealth and wealth psychology ===
In his cultural and psychological studies, Druyen examines, among other things, the influence of private financial wealth on society and the impact of large material wealth on the human psyche. To this end, Druyen conducted interviews with wealthy and super rich people worldwide (starting at about 30 million US dollars in net financial assets to several billion US dollars of free capital) and published numerous books and studies. In his much-acclaimed 2007 book, "Goldkinder - Die Welt des Vermögens", Druyen makes a distinction between wealth on the one hand and fortune on the other, and shapes the notion of wealth culture, While the concept of “The Rich” encompasses all those quantitative variables that are measurable in any way, the concept of wealth also includes its qualitative use and its individual requirements. By "wealth culture" Druyen understands the promotion and maintenance of material and immaterial values to protect of the individual and social viability. His wealth research thus focuses on the group of people who, in addition to self-chosen parts of their wealth, also use their abilities, their know-how and their sense of responsibility to help shape social development. In addition to the social prerequisites and consequences of such an understanding of the culture of wealth, Druyen also examines the psychic interactions between extraordinary material wealth and the attitudes and ways of life arising from it. He also noted that wealthy people are not necessarily happier, but are usually one step closer to the future than the average person.

=== Competence and readiness for change ===
Druyen's research on individual capacity for change and willingness to change is based on his research on demographic change, but here he takes a more socio-psychological perspective. In this sense, he sees demographic change as a prime example of the fact that the majority of people repress existing impulses, despite better knowledge, instead of dealing with them and make them active. Druyen reveals this "preventive incompetence" in his 2015 generation study, in which people from three different generations were questioned about their respective visions of the future. In his opinion, this is a reoccurring theme throughout the whole of human history. The results of the study laid the foundation for the field of future psychology.

=== Future Psychology ===
The psychology of the future focuses primarily on the areas of anticipation and prospection in an age characterized by accelerated change, digitization and virtuality. The ideas and fantasies of the future are collected in partly interactive surveys, in which robots and avatars are also used. In a conventional and population-representative survey from 2018 Druyen was able to show that the Germans are on the one hand very resilient and adaptable, on the other hand, but little future-optimistic and forward-looking acting. The goal of future psychological research is to understand the effects of future concepts and new technologies on thinking and acting and to derive action-guiding strategies in the sense of optimizing change.

== Awards ==
- 2018: Order of Merit of North Rhine-Westphalia

== Publications ==
- Menschendämmerung. 1988. ISBN 3-88611-033-8
- Die Wahrnehmung der Pluralität. 1999. ISBN 3-927949-99-X
- Olymp des Lebens – Das neue Bild des Alters. 2003. ISBN 3-472-05671-1
- Goldkinder – Die Welt des Vermögens. 2007. ISBN 978-3-938017-85-2
- Reichtum und Vermögen – Zur gesellschaftlichen Bedeutung der Reichtums- und Vermögensforschung. 2009. ISBN 978-3-531-15928-7
- Happy Princes – The Empowerment of Wealthibility. 2010. ISBN 978-3-902626-28-8
- Vermögen in Deutschland – Heterogenität und Verantwortung. 2010. ISBN 978-3-531-17689-5
- Die Zukunft des Alters. 2011. ISBN 978-3-902626-26-4
- Vermögenskultur – Verantwortung im 21. Jahrhundert. 2011. ISBN 978-3-531-17375-7
- Krieg der Scheinheiligkeit. Plädoyer für einen gesunden Menschenverstand. 2012. ISBN 978-3-9814141-4-1
- Verantwortung und Bewährung: eine vermögenskulturelle Studie. 2013. ISBN 978-3-531-19704-3
- Drei Generationen im Gespräch – Eine Studie zum intergenerativen Zukunftsmanagement. 2015. ISBN 978-3-658-10408-5
- Die ultimative Herausforderung. Über die Veränderungsfähigkeit der Deutschen. 2018. ISBN 978-3-658-19762-9
- Radical Change in Everyday Life: Foundations of Psychological Future Management. 2019. ISBN 978-3658256456
- with Valeska Mangel: Aus der Zukunft lernen – der Leitfaden für konkrete Veränderung. 2023. ISBN 978-3-95466-808-3
- with Christine Vogler: Pflege. Zukunft. Menschenrecht. – Zehn Empfehlungen für die Pflege von morgen. 2024. ISBN 978-3-06-452517-7
- with Caroline Heil and Leon Tsvasman: Zukunftspädagogik. Bildung und Lernen neu denken. 2026. ISBN 978-3-658-48810-9
- Die Wiederkehr des Guten. Über die Macht der Tat in einer Welt der Absichten. 2026. ISBN 978-3-451-03797-9
