= Saint Irmgardis =

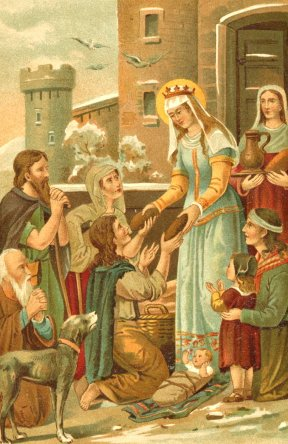
- Saint Irmgardis among the poor
- Born: 1000
- Died: † 1065 or 1082/1089
- Major shrine: Cologne Cathedral
- Feast: September 4

Saint Irmgardis, Saint Irmgard of Süchteln (1000 - † 1065 or 1082/1089, Cologne, Germany) was a medieval saint and sovereign Countess Irmgardis of Aspel (Germany) in 1013–1085. Her relics are preserved in sarcophagus in the altar of Cologne Cathedral.

Also known as Saint Irmgardis of Köln, the sources show her as Reigning Countess, and after her parents died, she distributed her wealth among hospitals, churches and social institutions. She lived a simple life in solitude and went on three pilgrimages to Rome. She spent her last years in Cologne, where she supported Chapters and Convents. Her feast day is 4 September.

== Institutions named after St. Irmgardis ==
- Church in Süchteln, near Viersen (Irmgardis-Kapelle)
- Hospital in Süchteln (St. Irmgardis-Krankenhaus)
- School in Cologne (Irmgardis-Gymnasium in Köln)
- Kindergarten in Viersen (Kindergarten St. Irmgardis)
- Brotherhood in Kevelaer (St. Irmgardis-Bruderschaft 1663 e.V.)

== Literature ==
- Arie Nabrings: Irmgardis von Süchteln, Volksheilige, im Online-Portal Rheinische Geschichte, veröffentlicht am 8. März 2013.
- Josef Kleinermanns: Die h. Irmgardis von Aspel und ihre Beziehungen zu Rees, Süchteln und Köln: ein Beitrag zur Rhein. Heiligengeschichte. Stauff, Köln 1900 (Digitalisat).
- Arie Nabrings: Die hl. Irmgardis von Süchteln. Rheinlandia, Siegburg 1995, ISBN 3-931509-01-X.
- Peter Norrenberg: Die heilige Irmgardis von Süchteln. Aus der rheinischen Geschichte, Band 19. Bonn 1894.
- Margret Riedel: St. Irmgardis – Herrscherin und Heilige vom Niederrhein. Teil 1 und 2, Wesel-Diersfordt 1985.
- Klaus-Gunther Wesseling: Irmgard von Köln. In: Biographisch-Bibliographisches Kirchenlexikon (BBKL). Band 2, Bautz, Hamm 1990, ISBN 3-88309-032-8, Sp. 1334–1335.
- Ekkart Sauser: Irmgard, Gräfin von Aspel. In: Biographisch-Bibliographisches Kirchenlexikon (BBKL). Band 23, Bautz, Nordhausen 2004, ISBN 3-88309-155-3, Sp. 719–720.
- Irmgardis, B.. In: Johann E. Stadler, Franz Joseph Heim, Johann N. Ginal (Hrsg.): Vollständiges Heiligen-Lexikon ..., 3. Band ([I]K–L), B. Schmid’sche Verlagsbuchhandlung (A. Manz), Augsburg 1869, S. 57.
