= Gismo Graf =

German jazz musician (born 1992)

Gismo Graf (born 1 October 1992 in Stuttgart) is a German jazz musician (guitarist, composer).

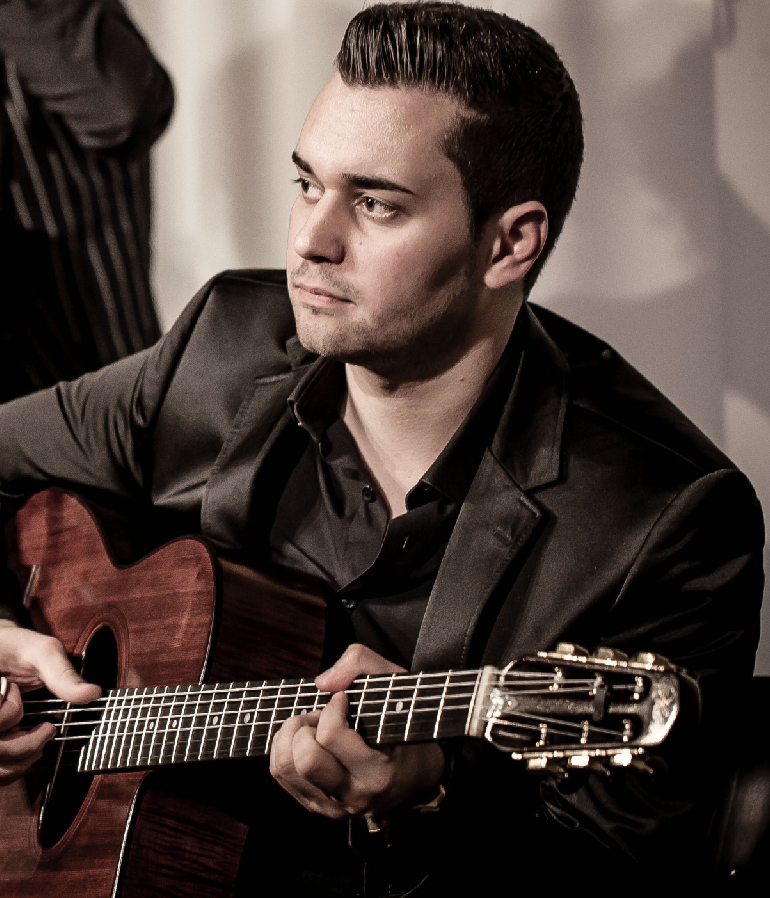
Gismo Graf 2016

== Biography ==
Graf picked up the guitar at 6 years of age. His father Joschi Graf (Co-founder of the Zigeli Winter Quintet) taught him the first chords and the rhythm playing on the guitar. A short time later he started to teach himself the melody or solo guitar. He focused strongly on his role model Django Reinhardt, by listening to his recordings and playing with them. At the age of 12 he had his first guest appearances in his father's band.

Graf formed his first band in 2008 under the name "16 Gypsy Strings". Other members besides Graf were Jan Jankeje (double bass) and Graf's father Joschi (rhythm guitar). The band toured Germany and neighboring countries before it disbanded in early 2010. In autumn 2010 Graf founded the "Gismo Graf Trio" with his father Joschi Graf on the rhythm guitar and the Stuttgart bassist Joel Locher. The first concert took place on 1 October 2010, on Graf's eighteenth birthday at the guitar festival in the sold-out Wehrer Stadthalle. Already the same year he succeeded with his album Absolutely Gypsy and the eponymous tour great sensation on the Gypsy jazz scene.

In the following years Graf toured with his trio through Germany, Europe and the USA. Among others, they performed at the festival Django Reinhardt Samois-sur-Seine (F), the Viersen Jazz Festival, the Rheingau Musik Festival, the Zelt-Musik-Festival Freiburg, the international Gipsy Guitar Festival Gossington (UK), the Blue Balls Festival Luzern (CH), the Festival Django a Liberchies (B), the Villa Celimontana Jazz Festival Rome (IT), and many others. In 2012, the Austrian publisher Doblinger published the book "Swing Up Your Guitar! Modern Gypsy Jazz Collection ", in which Graf had joint authorship.

Graf worked with musicians like Stochelo Rosenberg, Ludovic Beier, Diknu Schneeberger, Tony Lakatos, Jermaine Landsberger, Olaf Polziehn, Tim Kliphuis, Davide Petrocca (which also the sub double bass player of the Gismo Graf Trio).

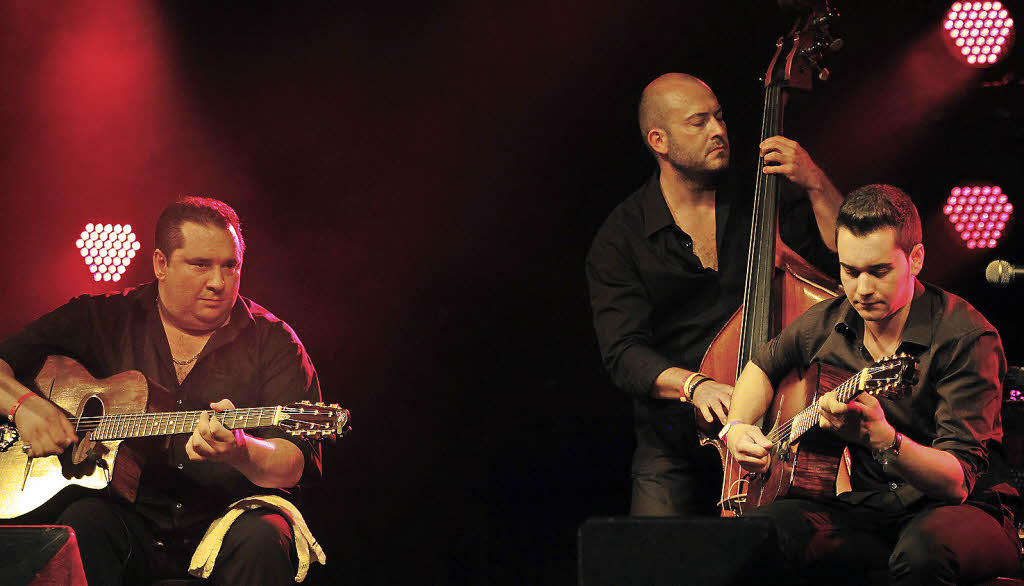
Gismo Graf Trio at the Zelt Musik Festival Freiburg 2013.

== Guitars ==
Graf, as his father Joschi, plays guitars of the German guitar builder Stefan Hahl, the model developed specifically for them La Comtesse (Dt.: The Countess). Likewise, Graf and his father play guitars by Italian luthier Mauro Freschi. In 2015 he signed an endorsement contract with a French guitar company (MarTo Guitars) for a semi-acoustic archtop jazz guitar.

== Selected discography ==
Band	Title	Year of release
Gismo Graf Trio	Absolutely Gypsy	2010
Gismo Graf Trio	The Pure Way	2012
Gismo Graf Trio	Modus Vivendi	2013
Gismo Graf Trio	The Django Reinhardt Memorial Concert	2018
