= Bismarck Tower (Viersen) =

Coordinates: 51°15′46″N 6°22′11″E

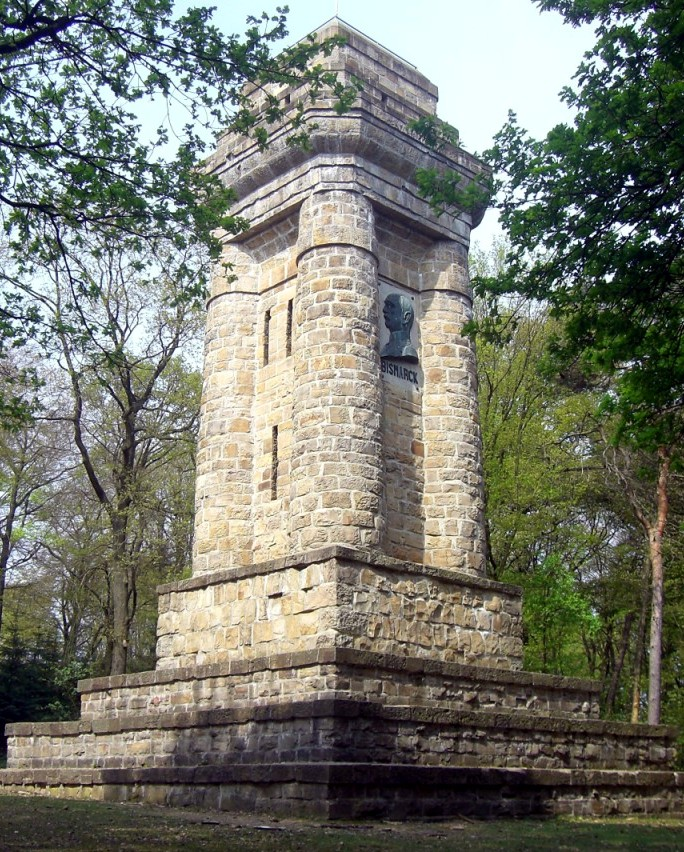
- Bismarck Tower Viersen
- Interactive map of Bismarck Tower
- Location: Viersen
- Designer: Wilhelm Kreis
- Material: Greywacke
- Height: 18.22 m (59.8 ft)
- Opening date: 1901
- Restored date: 2001
- Dedicated to: Otto von Bismarck

The Bismarck Tower located in Viersen (North Rhine-Westphalia, Germany) was erected in honour of the chancellor Otto von Bismarck and has since become an icon of the city of Viersen.

== Geographical situation ==
The Bismarck-Tower is situated in hilly woodland to the north west of Viersen called "Hoher Busch" namely on a hilltop called "Wilhelmshöhe", with a height of 84.94 metres above sea level the highest point of Viersen. At the time of its erection, the view from the top reached far out over the low-lying areas along the river Nier. Today, this view is blocked by tall trees.

== History and architecture ==
The idea of building such a tower in Viersen was born on the occasion of a birthday party in 1899 in honour of Kaiser Wilhelm II by especially influential and patriotic Viersen citizens. The necessary money was to be collected by fund-raising activities to which the mayor, Peter Stern, not only contributed but was one of the driving forces of the action group. In the end 104 citizens donated about 36,000 Marks (ℳ). The project was not without opponents: the Viersen pastor, Lorenz Richen, in the name of all Roman Catholic priests, gave a passionate speech against the idea of honouring Bismarck of all people. Bismarck, who in his time had fiercely fought against Roman Catholic influence, for instance in the school system, was for years unpopular in the mostly Catholic Rhine Province. Due to this speech encouraging Roman Catholics to protest, Richen lost his job as school inspector.

The idea for such a project did not originate in Viersen. As early as 1899, the patriotic "Deutsche Studentenschaften" (German Students Association) decided to honour Bismarck as the founder of the German Empire in 1871. After a competition for the design of towers or columns, they received 317 architectural plans and finally awarded the prize to the design by the Dresden architect Wilhelm Kreis called "Götterdämmerung". His work inspired many tower projects all over the German Empire. In Viersen, that plan was realized in 1900 in a slightly slimmer version than the original "Götterdämmerung". It ended in a huge iron brazier on top of the building in order to light a beacon visible for miles on special occasions. The selected construction material became cuboid greywacke from the Wiehl Valley.

The laying of the foundation stone was witnessed by several thousand people although the protesters had asked the Roman Catholic majority in town not to hoist the flags along the way of the patriotic procession leading from the town to the building site. The tower, then usually called the "Bismarck Column", was finished already in 1901.

It has a total height of 18.22 metres. On the night of the inaugural celebration the beacon was lit for the first time, and up to the time of World War I every year on the occasion of Bismarck's birthday, 1 April, for about two hours. The flames reached a height of about 4–5 metres. In the base, built from three ever smaller growing pedestals, there are 12 steps leading up to an iron door. Four columns with a diameter of 1.80 metres rise from the corners of the plinth with three quarters of their perimeter visible on the outside. Above that rises, with an out jutting cornice the architrave. As decoration for the iron door on the western side the Düsseldorf architect Josef Kleesattel designed a coloured coat of arms of the Bismarck family as well as their motto "In trinitate robur" (in trinity, there is power) and the Berlin sculptor Arnold Künne created a bronze relief of the chancellor for the eastern front of tower. Within a steep flight of stairs with 60 steps leeds up to the viewing platform.

At the end of the 1970s, the building was closed based on safety reasons. The restoration of the structural condition became unavoidable. For financial reasons it was not effected until 2001 within the framework of the "Euroga". The city of Viersen, the municipal savings bank and funding by the county together were able to raise the necessary €370.000 . Among other things the crumbling cement mortar lining of the joints was changed to a more modern material to avoid efflorescence.

== Situation today ==
For scientific, artistic and historical reasons the tower is listed as historical monument; for preservation and utilization this must be taken into consideration. After the restoration the building was reopened to the public in 2003. Since then you can see inside an exhibition of historical postcards on the subject of "Bismarck-Towers all over the world". Since 2006 the Viersen licensed radio amateurs look after the tower. They organize the opening hours as well, which are: from the first of April until the end of September on every first and third Sunday of the month. Groups can visit by special appointment all through the year and climb up to the top.

== Secondary literature ==
- Leistungskurs Geschichte 2005 des Städtischen Gymnasiums Dülken unter der Leitung von Gunnar Schirrmacher: Bismarcksäule auf dem Hohen Busch bei Viersen. Geschichte und Bedeutung. Stadt Viersen, Verschönerungsverein und Verein für Heimatpflege. Viersen 2005
- Fritz Eisheuer u.a.: Visitenkarte Bismarckturm. In: "100 Jahre Viersener Verschönerungsverein". Viersen o.J. (1986)
- Erinnerungen an die Bismarcksäule in Viersen. Viersen 1901
- Viersens Bauten aus alter und neuer Zeit. In: "Viersen-Dülken-Süchteln". (Deutschlands Städtebau). Berlin 1930.
