= Dülkener Schöppenmarkt =

Coordinates: 51°15′06″N 6°20′06″E

The Dülkener Schöppenmarkt (i. e. „Shovel Fair“) in Dülken is one of the largest and oldest country-fairs or Krammärkte in Western Germany.

== Date, Place, numbers of visitors ==
The Schöppenmarkt takes place on Ash Wednesday following carnival from 8.00 in the morning until 8.00 in the evening in the center of the once independent City of Dülken – today forming part of the city of Viersen. Depending on the weather conditions it was visited during the last years by an estimated 100.000 to 120.000 visitors from the surrounding Lower Rhine region, the Ruhr district and the neighbouring provinces of the Netherlands.

== History, size and present product range ==
This all-day fair, has been a meeting place for travelling retailers, since Ash Wednesday in 1847. It bears the name “Schöppenmarkt” i.e. Shovel Fair, because in olden times the farmers, workmen and housewives from the surrounding area came into town to the market to buy new tools and equipment normally not available in town, among others „Schöppen“, that is the expression for “Schaufel” (shovel) in the regional dialect. Today the retailers come from the whole of Germany, and some even from Belgium and the Netherlands, and offer a wide variety of goods alongside 4 kilometres of street front, for instance kitchen tools, spices, fan-articles, textiles, garden gnomes, horse meat, windscreen wipers, pottery, fruit or smoked fish. In a special area fairground barkers compete with ringing voices to sell their goods. All this complemented by drink stalls and snack-booths, who offer the traditional „fish-diet“ of Ash-Wednesday, the first day of Lent in the Christian tradition. The number of retailers who apply for participation is much higher, than the about 410 lots available. Due to the many visitors part of the Dülken city has to be closed down for car traffic during the day.

== Secondary literature ==
- Helena Siemes, Gerd Philips: Durch das Jahr. Feste und Bräuche am Niederrhein. Mercator: Duisburg, 2005. ISBN 3-87463-371-3.
- Der Propaganda-Markt. Sehen, hören, kaufen. In: „Daheim und unterwegs“. WDR Television program of 9 February 2005.
- Newspaper articles in the Rheinische Post and Westdeutsche Zeitung from 1998 to 2007.
