= Viersen =

- Town
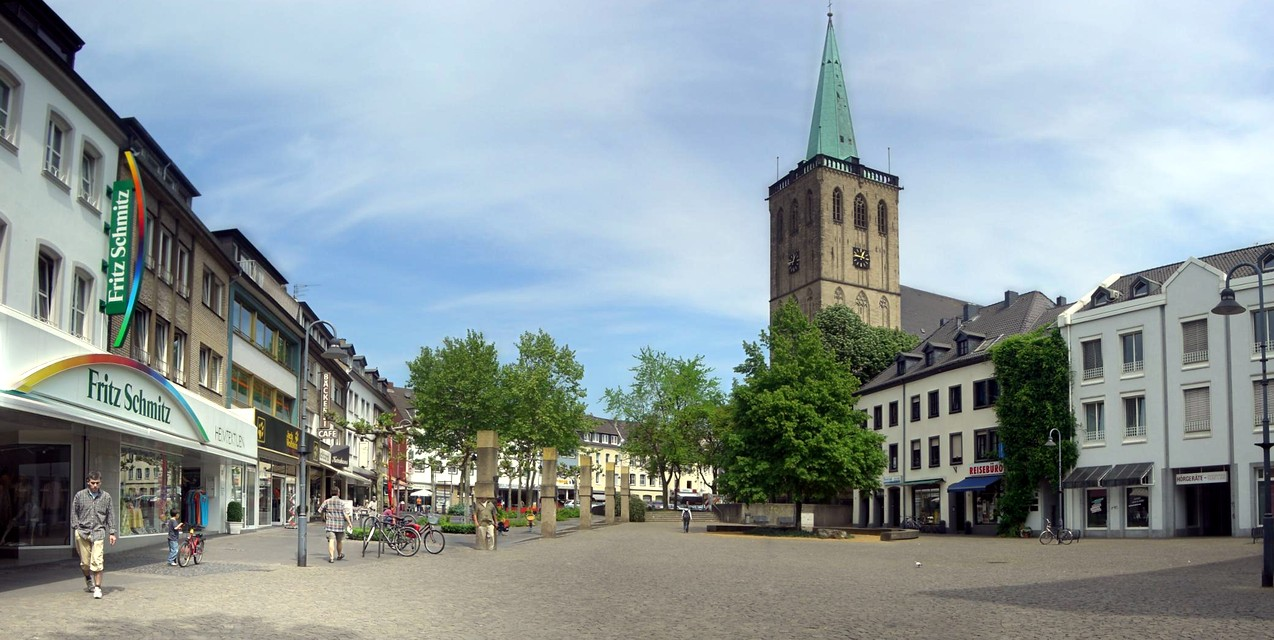

- Flag Coat of arms

- Location of Viersen within Viersen district
- Interactive map of Viersen
- Location within Germany Location within North Rhine-Westphalia
- Coordinates: 51°15′22″N 6°23′50″E
- Country: Germany
- State: North Rhine-Westphalia
- Admin. region: Düsseldorf
- District: Viersen
- Subdivisions: 4

Government
  - Mayor (2025–30): Christoph Hopp (CDU)

Area
  - Total: 91.1 km^{2} (35.2 sq mi)
- Elevation: 40 m (130 ft)

Population (2025-12-31)
  - Total: 78,227
  - Density: 859/km^{2} (2,220/sq mi)
- Time zone: UTC+01:00 (CET)
  - Summer (DST): UTC+02:00 (CEST)
- Postal codes: 41747–41751
- Dialling codes: 0 21 62
- Vehicle registration: VIE, KK
- Website: www.viersen.de

Viersen (German pronunciation: [ˈfiːɐ̯zn̩]; Limburgish: Veeëse) is the capital of the district of Viersen, in North Rhine-Westphalia, Germany.

== Geography ==
Viersen is situated approximately 8 km north-west of Mönchengladbach, 15 km south-west of Krefeld and 20 km east of Venlo (Netherlands).

=== Division of the town ===
The city of Viersen is made up of three (formerly independent) cities: Süchteln, Dülken and Viersen, which combined in 1970, and one former village, Boisheim, which combined with Viersen in 1968.

== Population ==
Historical population

Year	Pop.	±% p.a.
1965	83,315	—
1970	85,698	+0.57%
1975	84,228	−0.35%
1980	81,122	−0.75%
1985	78,497	−0.66%
1990	77,453	−0.27%
1995	77,338	−0.03%

Year	Pop.	±% p.a.
2000	77,130	−0.05%
2005	76,330	−0.21%
2010	75,360	−0.26%
2015	75,931	+0.15%
2020	77,376	+0.38%
2025	78,227	+0.22%

Source: Landesdatabank Nordrhein-Westfalen

== Politics ==
The current mayor of Viersen is Christoph Hopp of the Christian Democratic Union (CDU) since November 2025.

Previous mayoral election was held on 13 September 2020, with a runoff held on 27 September, and the results were as follows:

Candidate	Party	First round		Second round	
Candidate	Party	Votes	%	Votes	%
Christoph Hopp	Christian Democratic Union	11,438	40.5	11,572	49.2
Sabine Anemüller	Social Democratic Party	10,965	38.8	11,955	50.8
Martina Maaßen	Alliance 90/The Greens	3,418	12.1		
Simon Männersdörfer	The Left	1,098	3.9		
Frank a Campo	Free Democratic Party	935	3.3		
Siegfried Martin	National Democratic Party	404	1.4		
Valid votes		28,258	98.2	23,527	99.5
Invalid votes		521	1.8	118	0.5
Total		28,779	100.0	23,645	100.0
Electorate/voter turnout		63,176	45.6	63,169	37.4
Source: City of Viersen (1st round, 2nd round)

=== City council ===
Results of the 2020 city council election.

The Viersen city council governs the city alongside the Mayor. The most recent city council election was held on 13 September 2020, and the results were as follows:

Party	Votes	%	+/-	Seats	+/-
Christian Democratic Union (CDU)	11,806	41.9	▼1.9	22	▼2
Social Democratic Party (SPD)	6,669	23.7	▼2.3	13	▼2
Alliance 90/The Greens (Grüne)	5,491	19.5	▲7.9	11	▲5
The Left (Die Linke)	1,417	5.0	▼0.5	3	±0
Free Democratic Party (FDP)	1,343	4.8	▼0.1	3	±0
Alternative for Germany (AfD)	1,142	4.1	New	2	New
Die PARTEI	195	0.7	New	0	New
National Democratic Party (NPD)	107	0.4	▼1.0	0	▼1
Valid votes	28,170	98.0			
Invalid votes	584	2.0			
Total	28,754	100.0		54	▼2
Electorate/voter turnout	63,176	45.5	▲2.1		
Source: City of Viersen

== Economy ==
The company Mars Incorporated (chocolate bars) is situated in one of Viersen's industrial districts named Dülken-Mackenstein.

Kaiser's Tengelmann AG (a big supermarkets chain in Germany) had his headquarter in Viersen, until it was closed in 2010.

Cable manufacturer SAB Bröckskes employs 550 people (430 of them in Viersen-Süchteln).

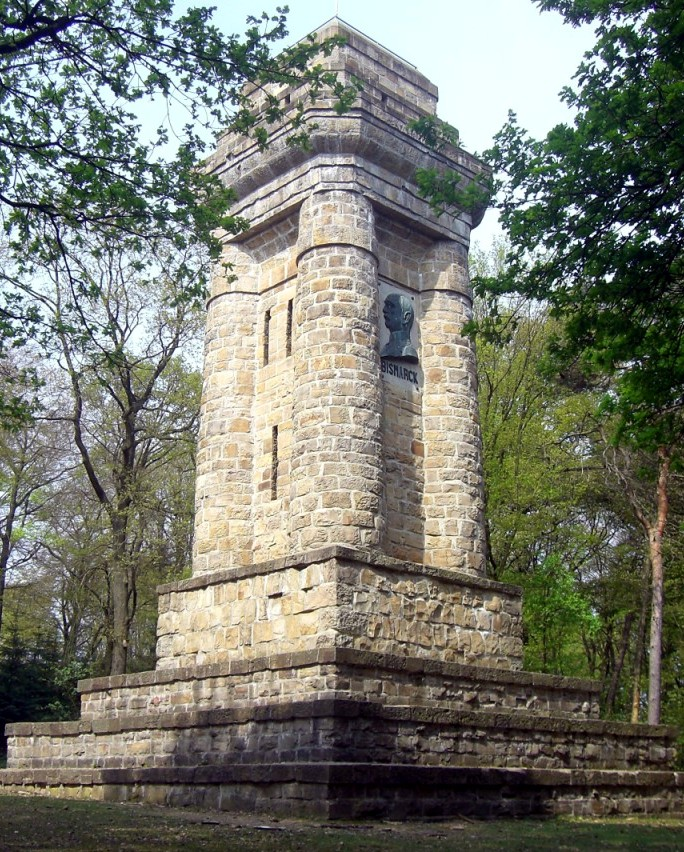
Bismarck Tower

== Culture ==
=== Recurring events ===
- Viersen Jazz Festival (International Jazz Festival in Viersen's Festival Hall) 4th weekend each September.
- The World Championships of Carom billiards take place in Viersen's Festival Hall. March
- Big Carnival Parades in all 3 city parts. The one in Dülken is one of the biggest and most traditional Parades in North Rhine-Westphalia. February
- The Dülkener Schöppenmarkt, a type of flea/junk market, which takes place on the day after the last Carnival parade, is one of Germany's biggest. February
- Big free flea market in Viersen's pedestrian zone, where only children are allowed to sell. Biggest market of this type in Germany. Summer
- "Viersen blüht" (Viersen is blooming) is a voluntary initiative which places arrangements and sculptures of flowers all over the city's pedestrian zone. Summer
- International Biker Meeting, organized by the local biker-club "MC Viersen 1980 e.V.". 2nd weekend each September
- Big kite-flying-festival. Autumn

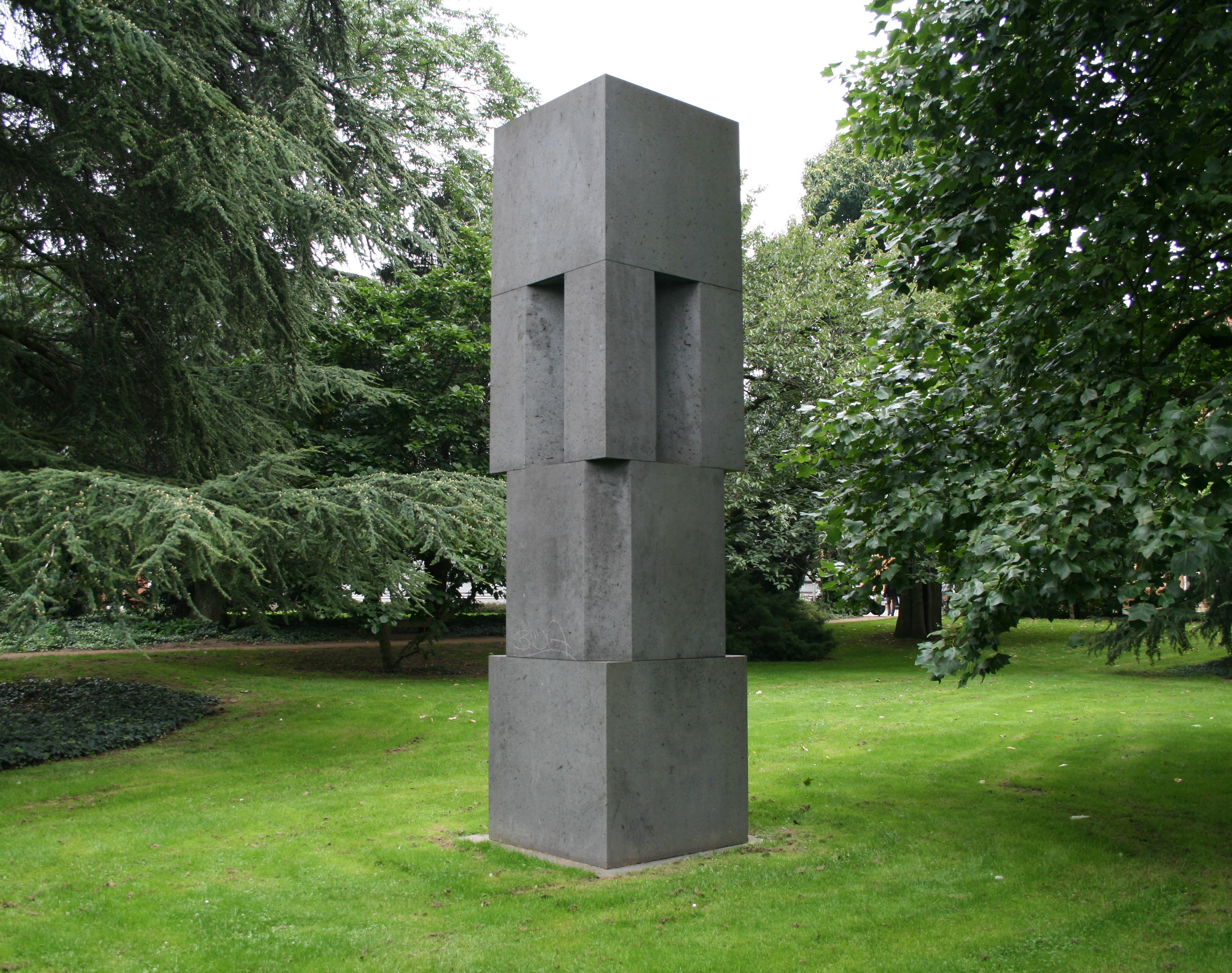
Viersen sculpture collection Erwin Heerich: Monument

== Main sights ==
- Viersen sculpture collection
- Städtische Galerie im Park Viersen
- Viersen Bismarck Tower
- Festhalle Viersen

== Transport ==
Viersen is connected to the region by a dense bus network and Viersen station. The station is served by various local and regional rail lines.

== Notable people ==
- Gustav von Mevissen (1815–1899), businessman and politician
- Max Nonnenbruch (1857–1922), painter
- Illa Martin (1900–1988), dendrologist, botanist, conservationist and dentist
- Albert Vigoleis Thelen (1903–1989), author and translator
- Hilde Bruch (1904–1984), psychoanalyst
- Erik Martin (1936–2017), writer, songwriter and composer of songs
- Helmut Reisen (born 1950), economist
- Udo Voigt (born 1952), politician
- Holger Henke (born 1960), political scientist
- Elmar Theveßen (born 1967), TV-journalist and author
- Till Brönner (born 1971), musician, arranger and producer
- Mirja Boes (born 1971), comedian, actress and singer
- Martin Plum (born 1982), politician
- Roosevelt (born 1990) music producer and singer
- Tim Stützle (born 2002), professional ice hockey player
- Ali Haurand (1943-2018), double bassist, bandleader, Chevalier des Arts et des Lettres and Viersen jazz festival founder

== Twin towns – sister cities ==
Viersen is twinned with:

- Calau, Germany
- Kaniv, Ukraine
- Lambersart, France
- Mittweida, Germany
- Pardesiya, Israel
- Peterborough, England, United Kingdom
