= Max Nonnenbruch =

German painter (1857–1922)

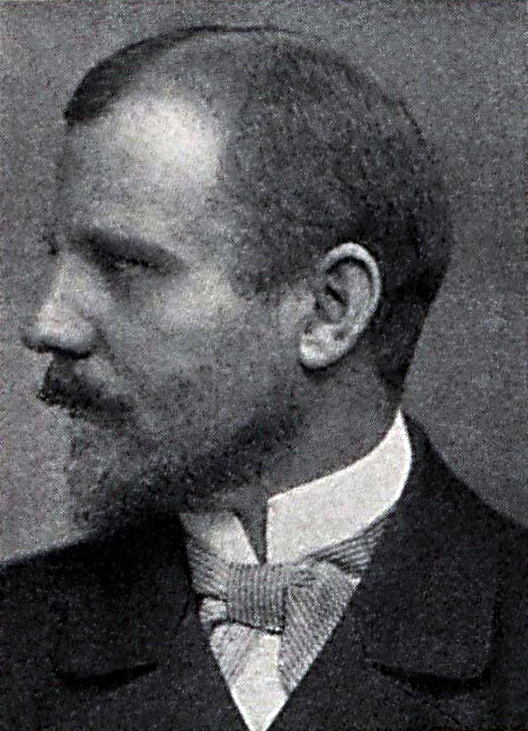
- Nonnenbruch in 1901.
- Born: 25 January 1857; Viersen, Germany
- Died: 13 March 1922 (aged 65); Munich, Germany

Max Nonnenbruch (25 January 1857 – 13 March 1922) was a German painter from the Munich School, a group mostly known for their Neoclassicism and Symbolism.

== Gallery ==
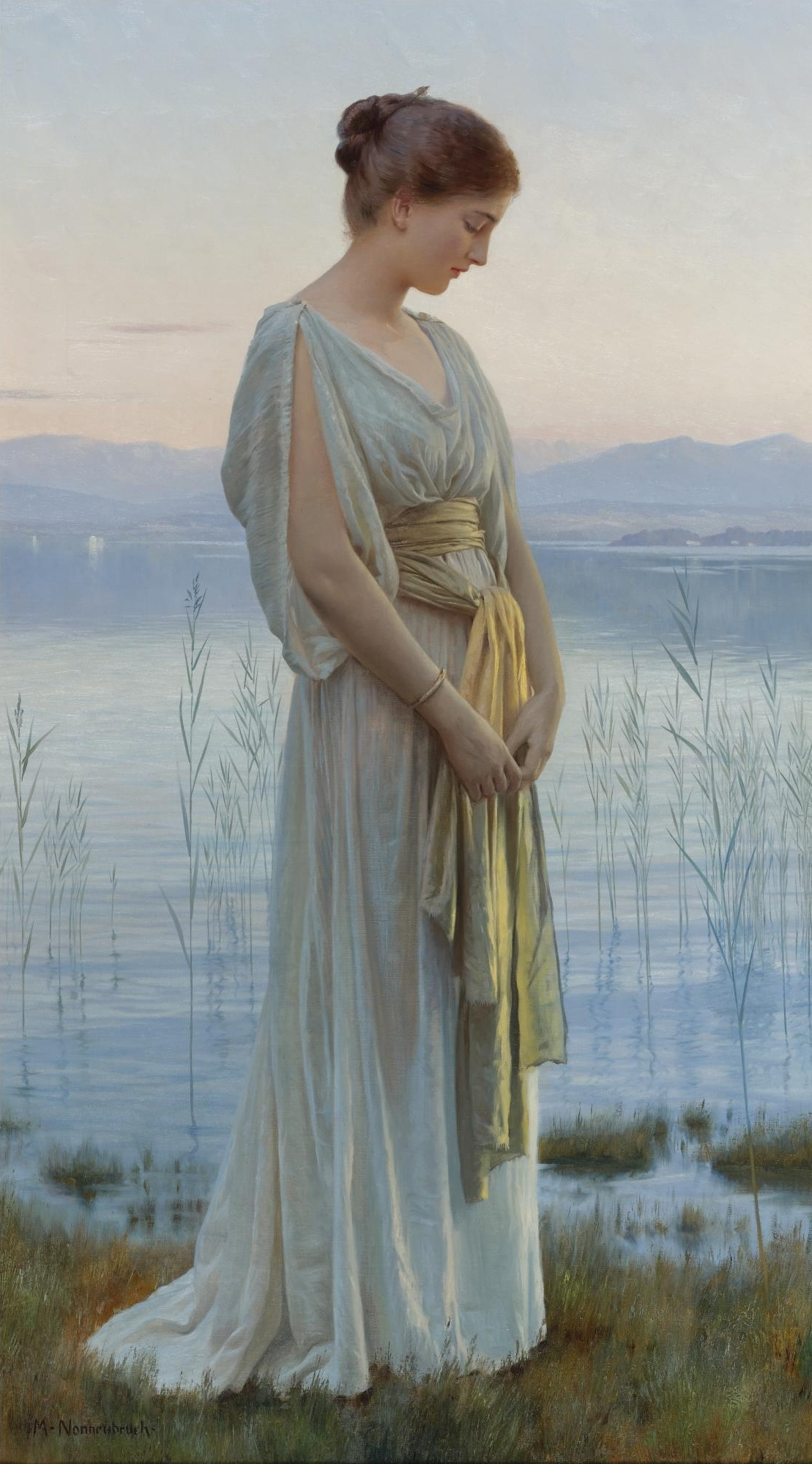

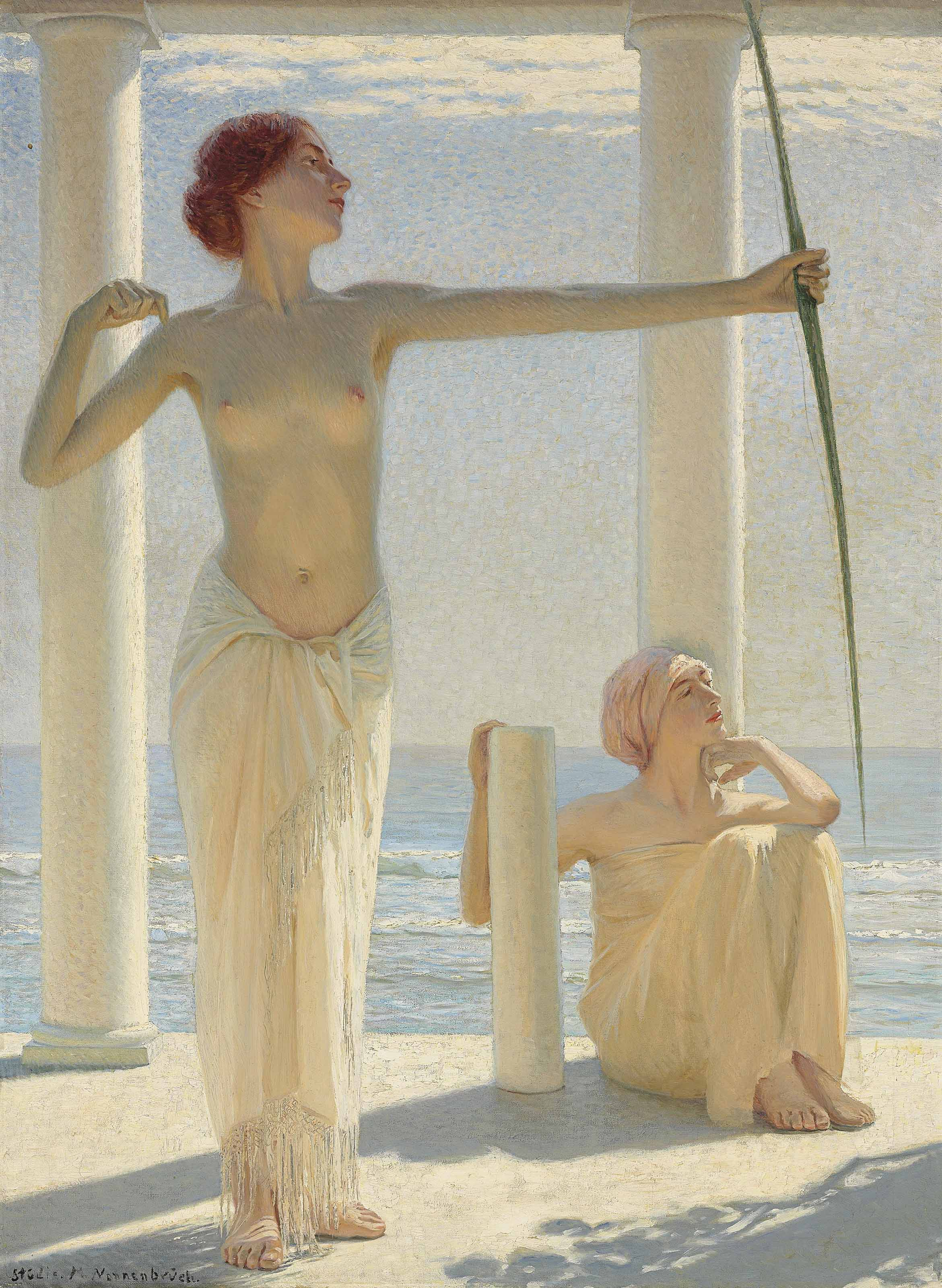

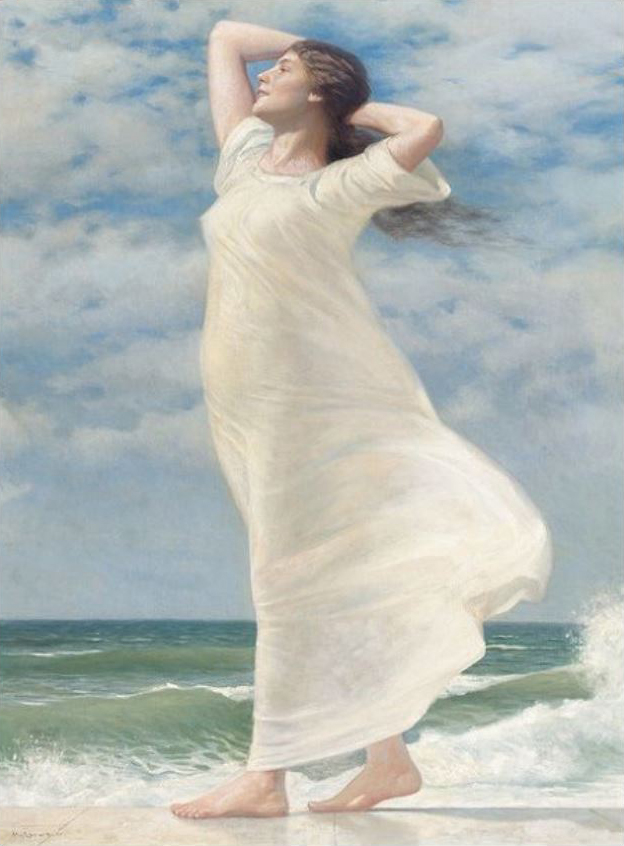

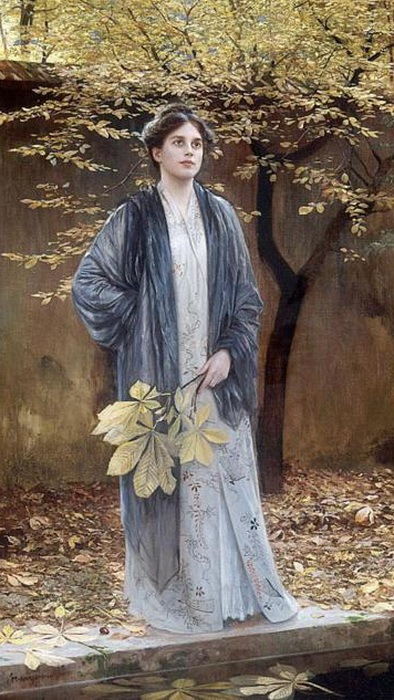

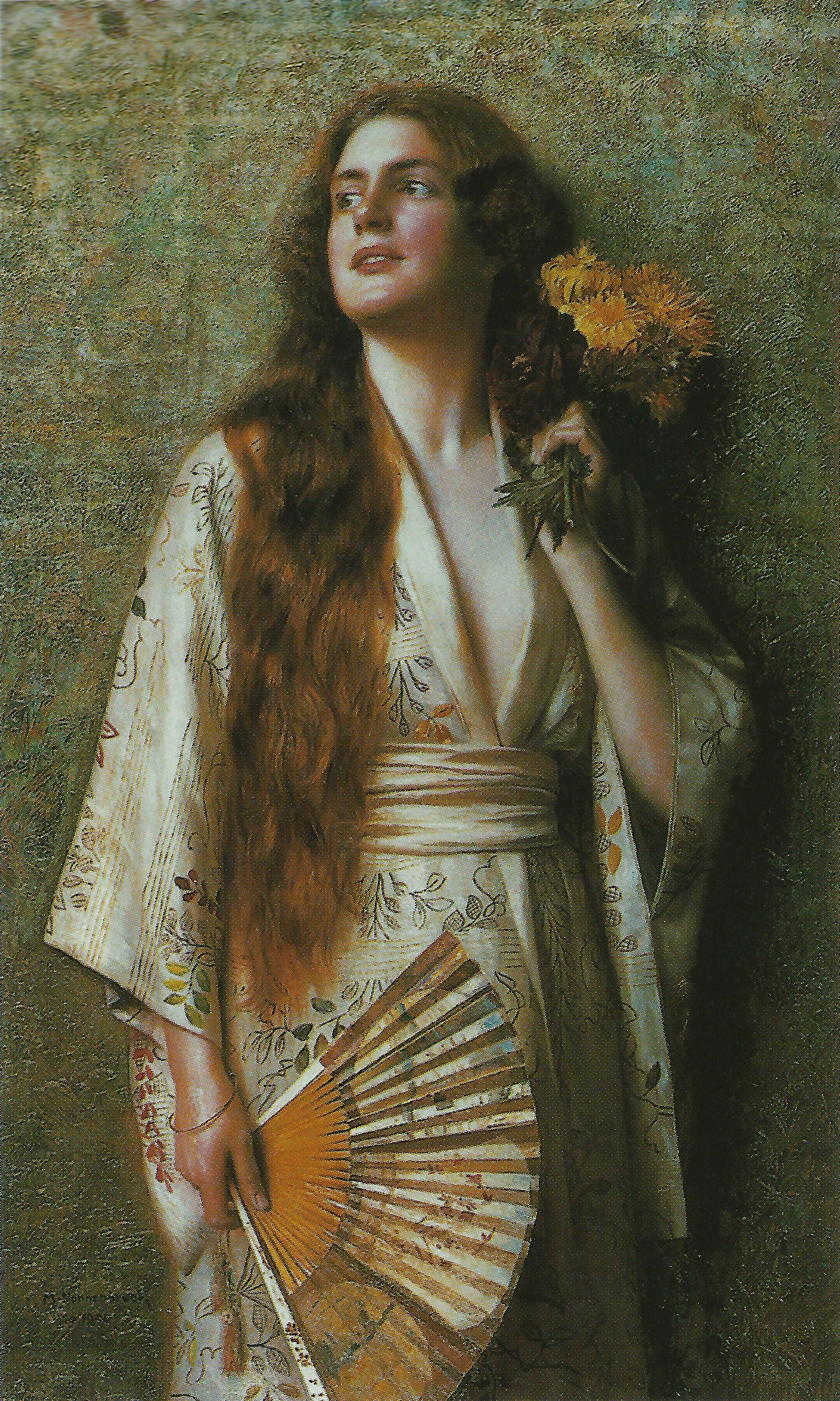

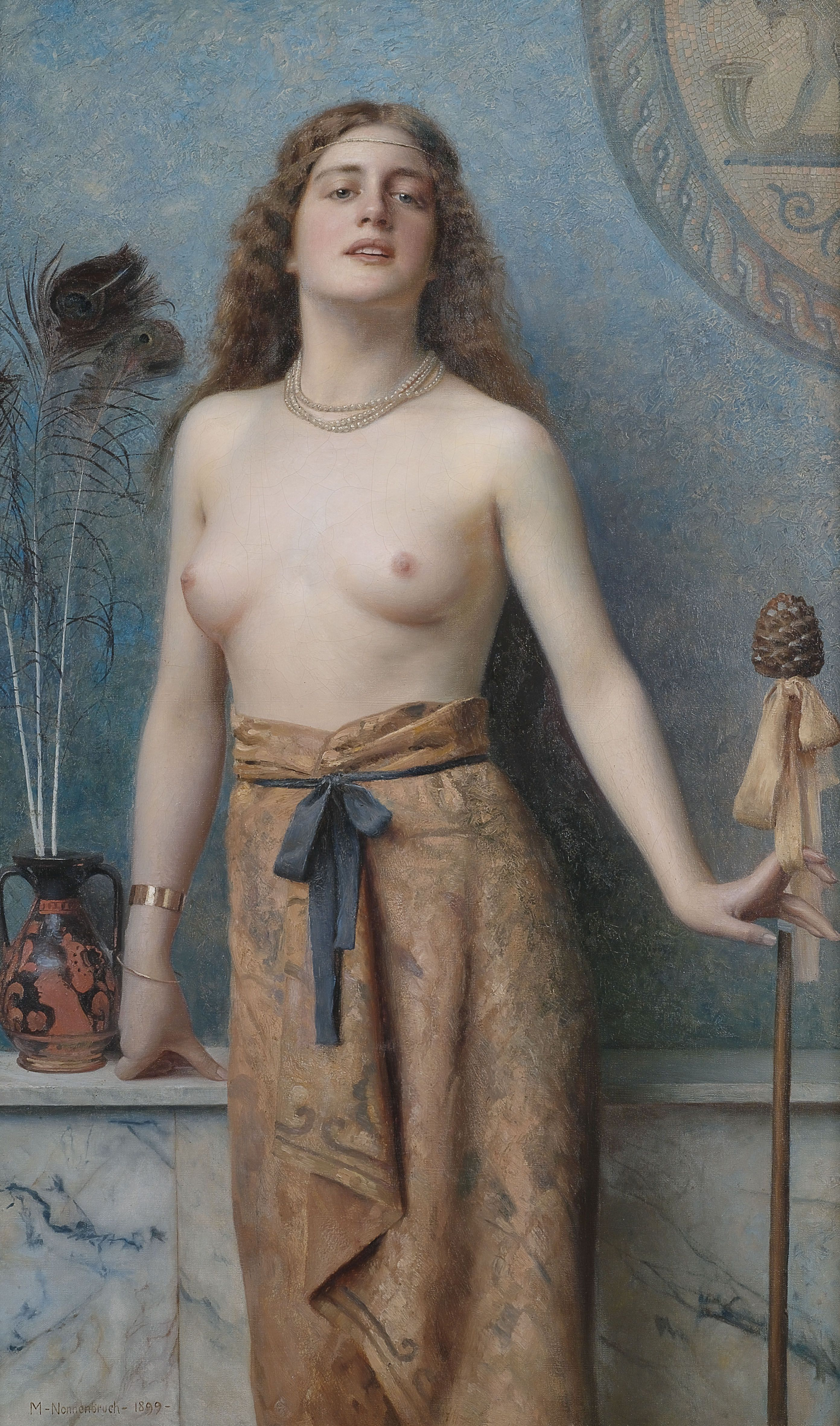

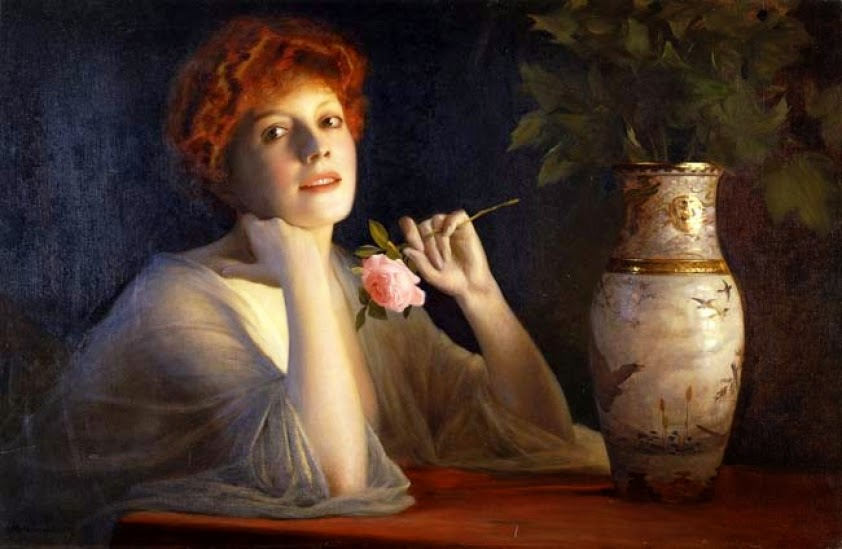

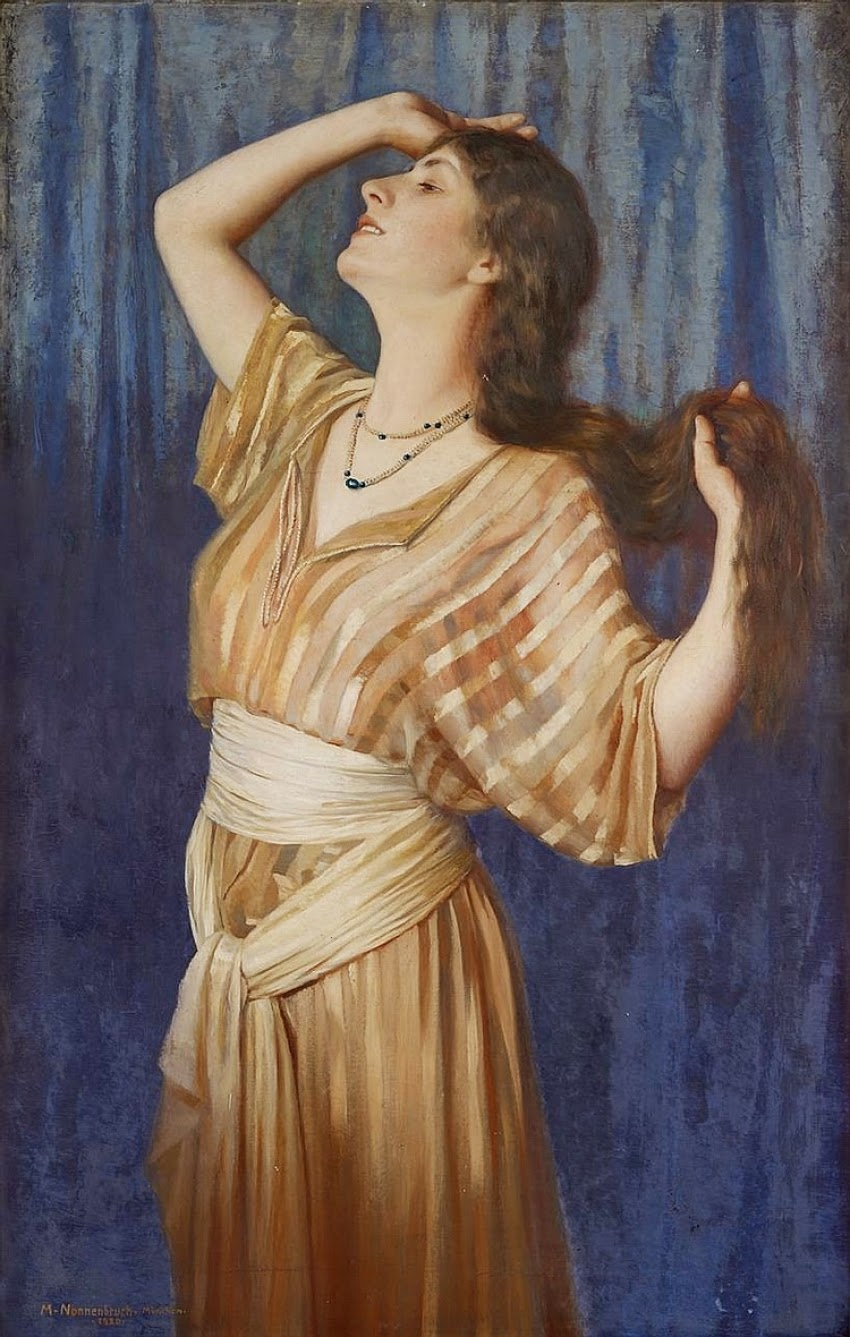

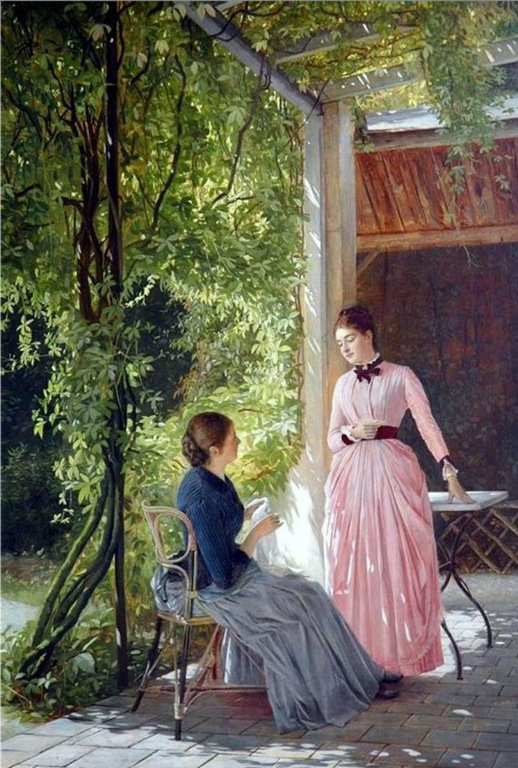
