= Albert Vigoleis Thelen =

German author and translator (1903–1989)

Albert Vigoleis Thelen (28 September 1903 – 9 April 1989) was a German author and translator (from Portuguese) who was born in Süchteln, Lower Rhine region and died in Dülken.

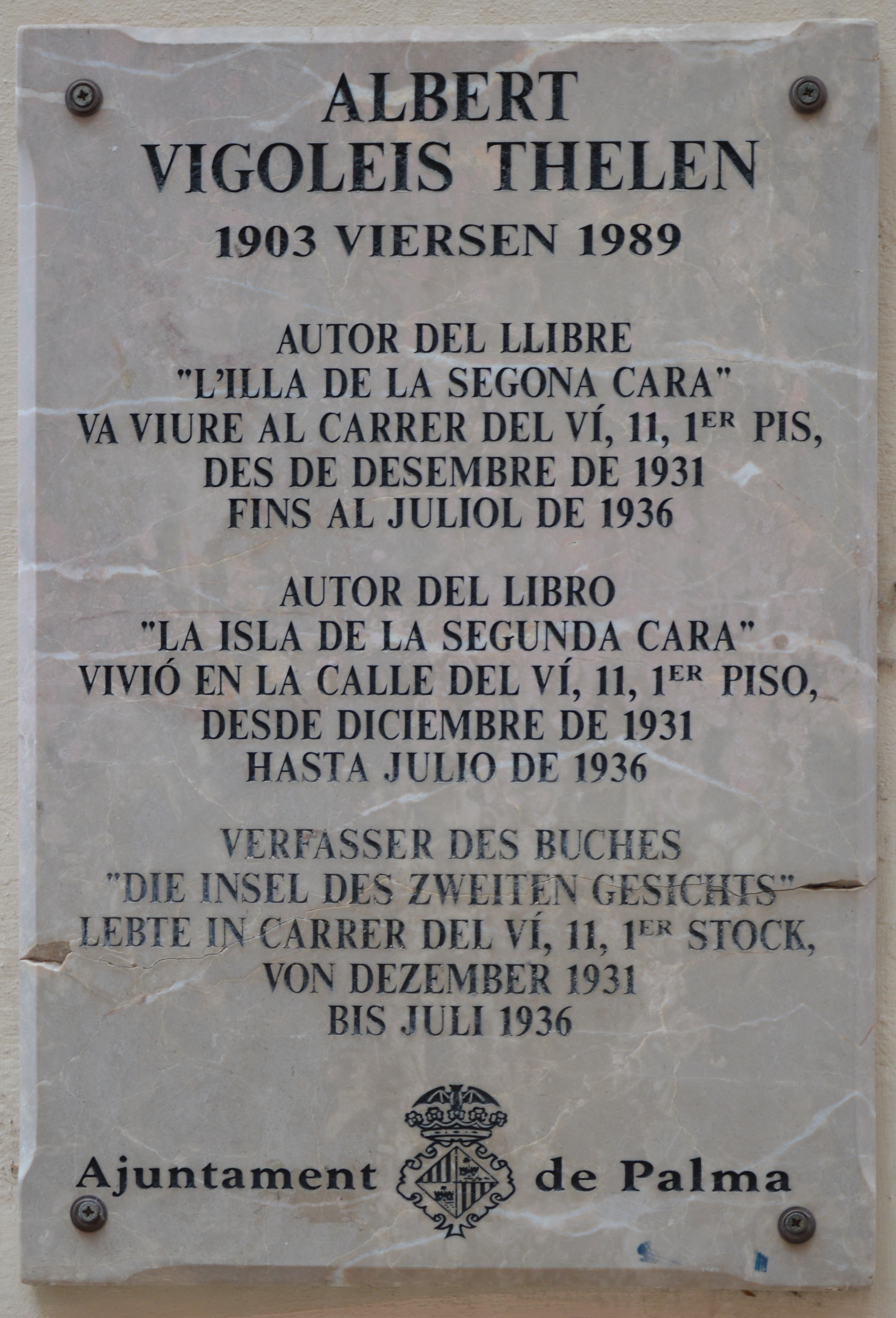

== Life ==
Thelen was the son of booksellers Louis Thelen and Johanna Scheifes. After the primary school (1909–1913) he attended the Kaiser-Wilhelm Schule (1913–1918).

== Works ==
Thelen's main work, The Island of Second Sight, which has been praised by many as one of the great achievements in German literature of the 20th century, was published in 1953. It was soon translated into Spanish and French, later also into Dutch. Not until 2010 when it was published by Galileo Publishing in Cambridge, through the efforts of Isabelle Weiss, was it made available to English readers. The award-winning translation by Donald O. White won the 2013 PEN Translation Prize.
