= Helmut Reisen =

Helmut Reisen

Helmut Reisen (born 20 July 1950 in Viersen, West Germany) has been Head of Research of the OECD Development Centre until 1 October 2012 when he established the Berlin-based consulting firm ShiftingWealth Consulting. He is also Professor of Economics at the University of Basel.

== Awards ==
- 1993: Bronze, Amex Bank Review essay competition in international finance ("Integration with Disinflation")
- 1994: Bronze, Amex Bank Review essay competition in international finance ("On the Wealth of Nations and Retirees")

== Career ==
Reisen's publications have dealt with the role of the renminbi for global imbalances, China's impact on Africa, and on debt sustainability in poor countries. He has developed the core concept of the first OECD Perspectives on Global Development, which was published in 2010 under the title Shifting Wealth, an analysis of the policy implications of the rise of emerging powers.

== Academic memberships ==
Reisen is on the advisory board of Internationale Politik, Journal of Development Finance and Deutsche Bank Research Notes. Reisen is also elected member of the Development Committee of the German Economic Association Verein für Socialpolitik.

== Publications ==
Reisen has published several books and many articles in academic journals. His most recent book was published in 2006: The Rise of China and India - What's in it for Africa?, ISBN 92-64-02441-7, by Andrea Goldstein, Nicolas Pinaud, Helmut Reisen and Xiaobao Chen, Paris, OECD.

Edward Elgar Publishing produced two collected essays of Dr. Reisen's writings: - Debt, Deficits and Exchange Rates, 1994, 256 pp, Hardback, ISBN 978-1-85278-930-5 - Pensions, Savings and Capital Flows, 2000, 277 pp, Hardback, ISBN 978 1 84064 308 4
