= Hilde Bruch =

American psychoanalyst & MD

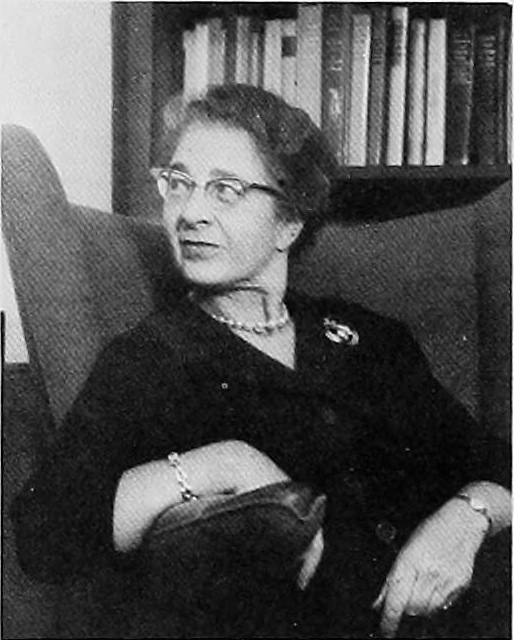
- Bruch c. 1960
- Born: 11 March 1904; Dülken, Germany
- Died: 15 December 1984 (aged 80); Houston, Texas
- Citizenship: United States
- Known for: Research into Anorexia nervosa, eating disorders
- Awards: President's Citation for Meritorious Contributions to the Clinical Services, Baylor College of Medicine (1978); William A. Schonfeld Award for Contribution to Psychiatry, American Society for Adolescent Psychiatry (1978); Golden Doctoral Diploma, Medical Faculty of Albert-Ludwig University of Freiburg (1978); Mount Airy Gold Medal Award for Distinction and Excellence in Psychiatry (1979); Nolan D.C. Lewis Award for Contributions to Psychiatry (1980); American Psychiatric Association Founders Award (1981), Agnes Purcel McGavin Award, American Psychiatric Association (1981); Joseph B. Goldberger Award in Clinical Nutrition, American Medical Association (1981)
- Scientific career
- Fields: Medicine
- Workplaces: Columbia University; Baylor College of Medicine, Houston.

Hilde Bruch (March 11, 1904 – December 15, 1984) was a German-born American psychiatrist and psychoanalyst, known foremost for her work on eating disorders and obesity.

Bruch emigrated to the United States in 1934. She worked and studied at various medical facilities in New York City and Baltimore before becoming a professor of psychiatry at Baylor College of Medicine in Houston in 1964.

In 1973 she published her seminal work Eating Disorders: Obesity, Anorexia Nervosa, and the Person Within. This book was based on observations and treatments of eating disorders, such as anorexia nervosa, over several decades. In 1978 she published The Golden Cage: the Enigma of Anorexia Nervosa, a distillation of Eating Disorders aimed at the lay reader. Her other works include Don't Be Afraid of Your Child (1952), The Importance of Overweight (1957), and Learning Psychotherapy: Rationale and Ground Rules (1974). A final work, Conversations with Anorexics (1988) was published posthumously.

== Early life ==
Hilde Bruch was born in the small German town of Dülken, on the Lower Rhine near the Dutch border, She was the third of seven children, with four brothers and two sisters. Her parents, Hirsch and Adele (Rath) Bruch were members of the local Jewish community.

At an early age, Bruch wanted to become a mathematician. An uncle convinced her however that medicine offered better career possibilities for a Jewish woman. She studied at the Albert Ludwig University in Freiburg im Breisgau, where she graduated as a doctor in medicine in 1929.

Bruch accepted academic posts at the University of Kiel, and subsequently at the University of Leipzig, where she undertook research and studies for two years. This coincided with a period of rising anti-Semitism across Germany and in the university, which eventually forced Bruch to abandon her academic career. In October 1932 she moved to a private pediatric practice in Ratingen, near Düsseldorf. However conditions for the Jewish community in Germany continued to deteriorate and in April 1933 legislation was enacted that severely restricted "Jewish activity" in the medical and legal professions. Bruch was persuaded to flee to England in June 1933. She stayed in London for a year, working at the East End Maternity Hospital, which served the Jewish immigrant community in London's impoverished East End.

== Career ==
In September 1934 Bruch emigrated to the United States and settled in New York City, where she worked at the Babies' Hospital. She obtained her pediatric licence in 1935 and became an American citizen in 1940. In 1937 she began to research obesity in children, having obtained a fellowship from the Josiah Macy, Jr. Foundation. This would mark the beginning of her career involvement with eating disorders.

From 1941 to 1943, Bruch studied psychiatry at Johns Hopkins University, a private research university in Baltimore, Maryland. She underwent psychoanalytic training, studying under a number of notable psychiatrists, including Frieda Fromm-Reichmann, Harry Stack Sullivan, Theodore Lidz and Lawrence S. Kubie. In 1943 Bruch returned to New York, opened a private psychoanalytic practice and taught at Columbia University, where she became affiliated with the College of Physicians and Surgeons. She was appointed clinical associate professor in 1954 and professor in 1959.

In 1964, Bruch accepted a position as Professor of Psychiatry at the Baylor College of Medicine, Houston. She would live the remainder of her life in Houston; however, before departing New York, she purchased a Rolls-Royce, saying she would "never kowtow to Texans in Cadillacs."

== Views on hunger ==
For Bruch, the psychological experience of hunger "is not innate, but something that contains important elements of learning." She believed that this learning takes place during early child-mother interaction, and that disordered hunger awareness resulted from the "absence or paucity of appropriate and confirming responses to signals indicating their needs and other forms of self-expression." When food is used to pacify every instance when the child is upset, or is withheld as punishment the child will be "unable to differentiate between various needs, feeling helpless in controlling his biological urges and emotional impulses."
