= Viersen sculpture collection =

Coordinates: 51°15′29″N 6°23′30″E

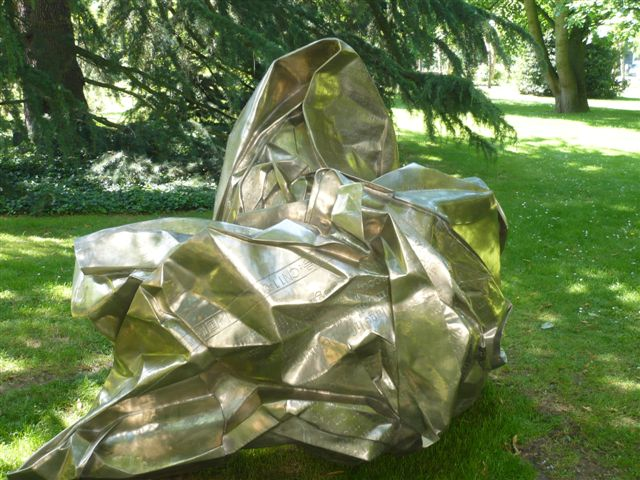
Wang Du: China Daily

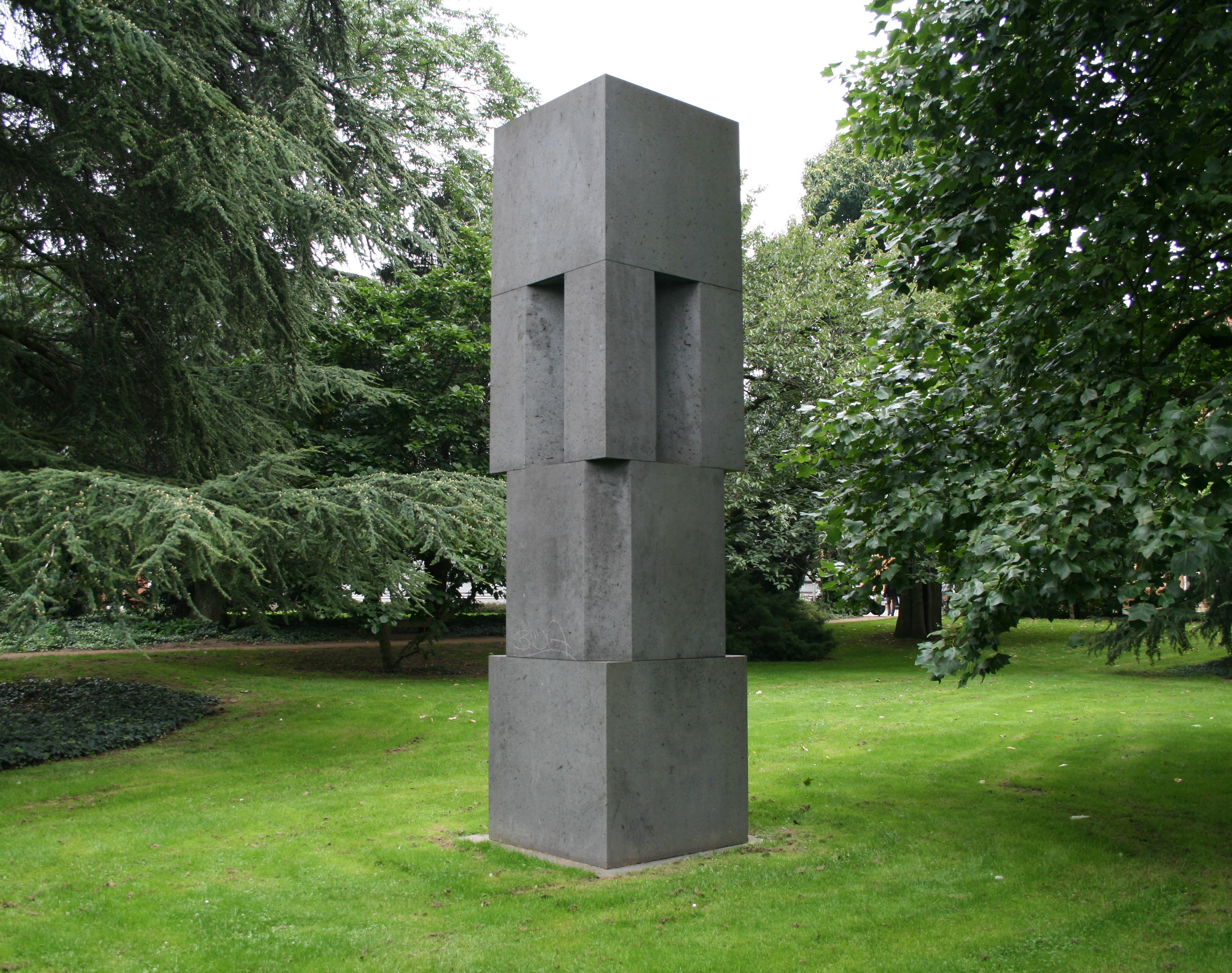
Erwin Heerich: Monument

The Viersen Sculpture Collection belongs to the major sculpture parks in Germany and is located in the center of Viersen (North Rhine-Westphalia).

== History ==
The Viersen Sculpture Collection was built up during the last 25 years by the donation of the American businessman and former Viersen citizen William Pohl as well as by other donations and funds from the “Stiftung Kunst und Kultur” of North Rhine-Westfalia. So the park surrounding the City Art Gallery “Galerie im Park” developed into a fine sculpture collection to which contributed well renowned artists with remarkable works.

When in 1992 the 12 meters high steel sculpture New Star consisting of five parts, which was already created in 1986/87 by the US-Artist Mark di Suvero, was first erected on loan on the Diergardt-Place, a storm of protest against it arose via letters to the editor of the local paper by Viersen citizens. This example of modern art was too alien to many of them. Meanwhile repeated information over the artists and their works, the international acceptance of the exhibition shown by numerous visitors form all over Germany, as well as other countries and extensive media coverage have led to a change of heart among the citizenry.

== Significance and works ==
A special attraction within the collection is the bronze Articulated column by the English artist Tony Cragg (1996), which was created especially for the Viersen Sculpture Park. The first sculpture was the in 1989 erected Monument consisting of Eifel basalt by the artist Erwin Heerich (1922-2004), then teaching art at the Kunstakademie Düsseldorf. Above that the artist presented the collection in 1992 with a bird bath from the same material, as well as several benches made of steel and stone, which go very well with the other artworks in the park. Other important works of the Sculpture Park are:

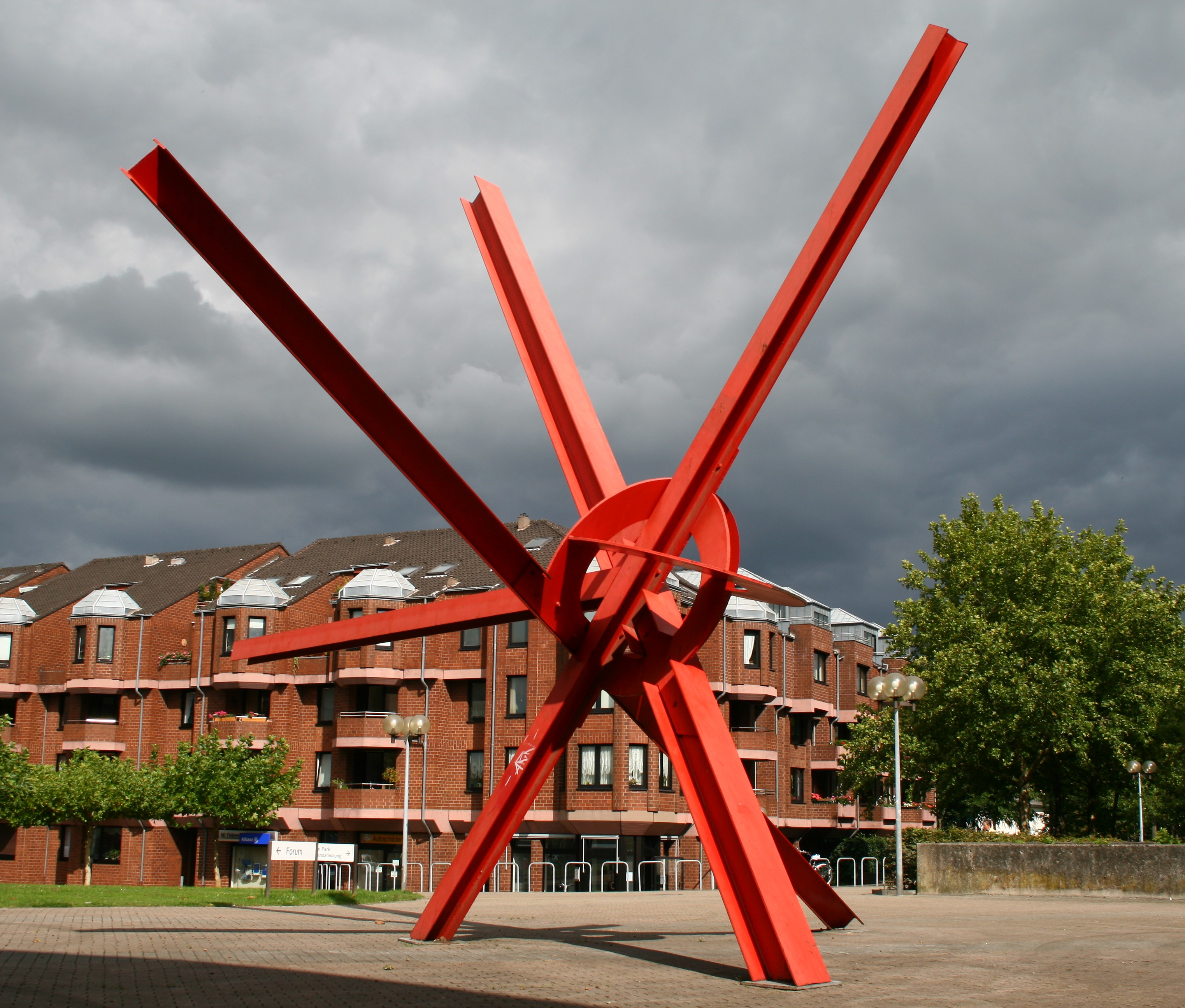
New Star

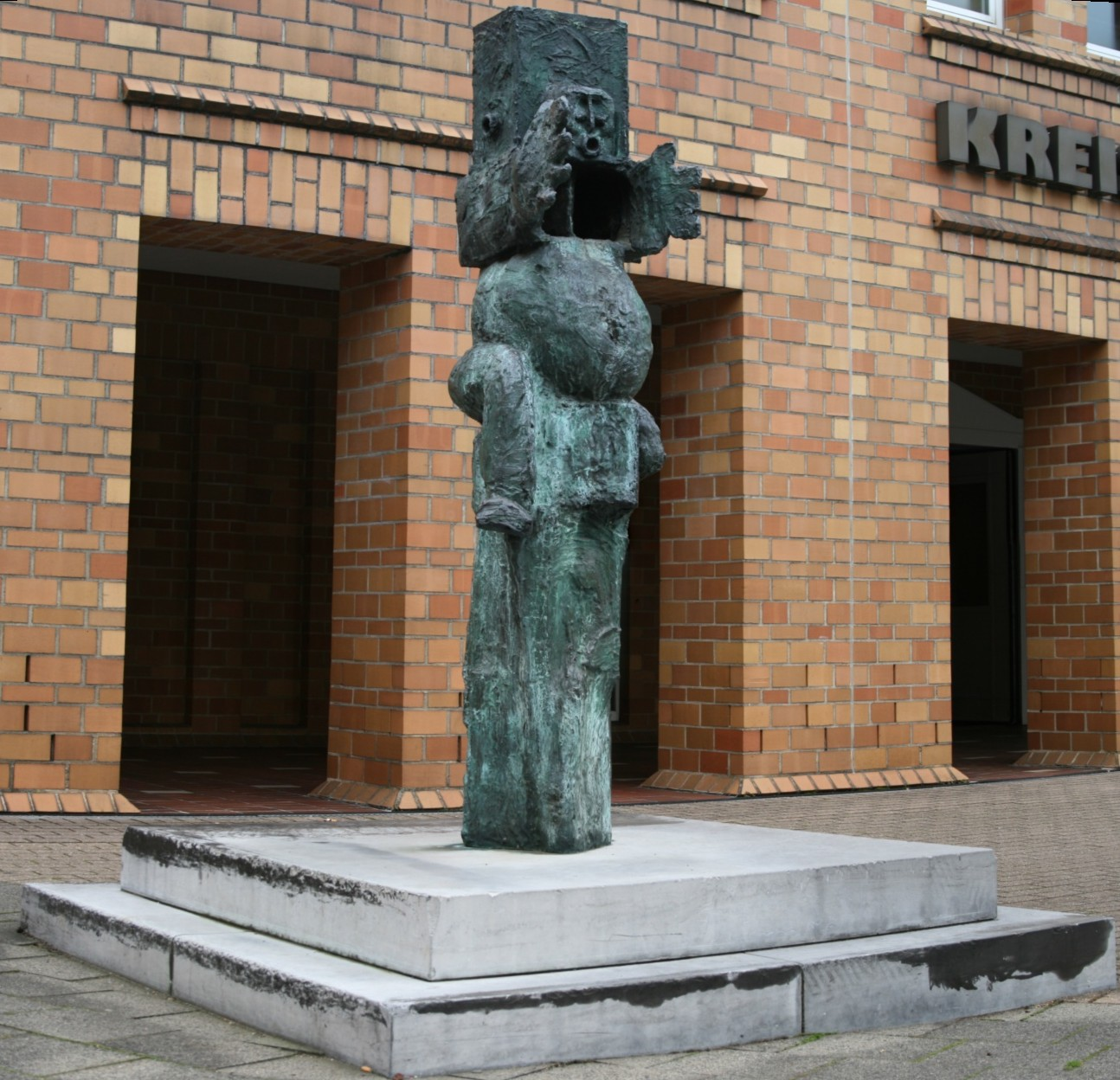
Kaspar

- David Lauer: Figur, body of bronze on base of basalt (1989)
- Karl Horst Hödicke: Kaspar, bronze sculptured column (1989)
- Wolfgang Nestler: Position im Schwerpunkt (1997)
- Roberto Matta: Chaosmos (2002)
- Günther Haese: Optimus II, kinetic installation (2007)
- Wang Du: China Daily (2010)

In 1999 a special edition of graphic works by artists who had contributed to the Viersen Sculpture Collection was published, the profits of which were meant to go into the acquisition of further works of art. In addition the Viersener Heimatverein published several art historic brochures on the respective works of art.

== Secondary literature ==
- Joachim Peter Kastner: Günter Haese. Skulpturensammlung Viersen. Viersen 2007. ISBN 978-3-9808779-6-1
- Albert Pauly: Skulpturensammlung Viersen. In: „Muschelhaufen“. Nr. 41. Viersen 2001. ISSN 0085-3593
- Werner Spies, Peter Kastner: Roberto Sebastian Antonio Matta Echaurren in der „Skulpturensammlung Viersen“. Viersen 2002. ISBN 3-9805339-5-6
