= Wang Du (artist) =

Chinese artist

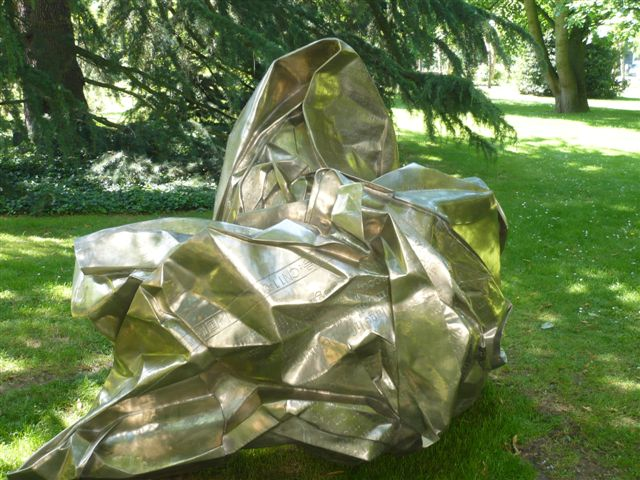
Wang Du: China Daily (Viersen Sculpture Collection)

Wang Du (Chinese: 王度, born 1956) is a contemporary Chinese artist who focuses on three-dimensional painted objects. Traditionally trained in Guangzhou, he now lives and has his studio in Paris. His works show strong influences of contemporary Western art and culture, and represent his own notions of modernity and development, and his personal relationship with both China and the West.

== Biography ==
Born in Wuhan, in Hubei Province, the son of a factory manager, Wang sketched and painted from a very young age, beginning to work for the Cultural Revolution government at the age of sixteen. He produced posters and painted interiors while working in mines and a steel company, while exercising his creative skills and ideas privately. He had his first exhibition in 1976, at the age of 20, the year that Mao Zedong died. Moving to Guangzhou, Wang took the entrance exams for university and failed them in 1977, but succeeded in 1981 and enrolled at the Guangzhou Institute of Fine Arts.

Though offered a diverse program in both traditional Chinese and Western art, Wang desired to broaden his horizons further. His experience, like that of many artists, during the Cultural Revolution was one of copying and producing propaganda, not of expressing or exercising creativity, and this mode of artistic education was simply too traditional for him. As China continued to open to public expression and greater freedoms for artists, Wang left university in 1985, without graduating.

Amidst a growing, burgeoning artistic community, Wang founded a group called "Southern," along with a number of other artists and intellectuals, to share in one another's work, and to engage in intellectual discussion. Together, they organized performances, and a wide variety of other artistic and intellectual works. He also organized talks at the local library, inviting a variety of speakers to lecture on a monthly basis, until, in late 1987, an agent of the Ministry of the Interior who had been attending his lectures warned him to stop. He complied, fearing that if he did not, he could be imprisoned.

Two years later, after speaking out against corruption, he was arrested and imprisoned for nine months, after which he left for Paris, having married a French journalist he met in Guangzhou. He began to produce and exhibit art there, and gained a number of connections in the French art world through his wife. In 1992, at an exhibition in Switzerland, he was strongly influenced by the work of Jeffrey Deitch, and wrote about it in the first issue of a self-titled magazine, describing the intriguing notions Deitch's work evoked about humanity's artificial and rapid evolution, modern-day science having far more of an effect on society than history and traditional culture.

One of his major exhibitions which came shortly afterwards reflected his difficulties in adjusting to French (and European and Western) society and culture, and involved three-dimensional painted objects drawn from images of his daily life in Paris. The influence of Deitch's Post Human exhibition was revealed in an exhibition by Wang in 1997, which featured sculptures or statues of nude figures who represented, Wang said, the people of the future, who enjoy the ability, through biotechnology, to redesign their bodies as they choose.

== Art ==
These would be the first of many similar pieces created by Wang, human figures which represent gender play, and a more general play with the human form as a whole. Some of his figures are genderless, some decidedly female with grossly enlarged breasts, or highly muscular male figures. Many, whether sitting on the ground or suspended in the air, are cut off at the legs, or at the torso. One of his more famous pieces, perhaps, is of a young Chinese boy, only his upper half, pulling back on a slingshot, his forward hand greatly enlarged so as to indicate a play with foreshortening and perspective.

Another exhibition, created in the same year and toured around the world, was called Cities on the Move. In this, Wang experimented with concepts related to modern advertising and subliminal experiences. The exhibition included sculpture statues of prostitutes hidden around unexpected corners of the gallery, and watchtowers in the style of the Great Wall of China which emitted a myriad of background soundtracks, conversations and the like recorded by Wang in restaurants, karaoke bars, trains, and various other places around China.

Much of his work since then has focused on the relationship between the media and the public consciousness, and on the artificial controls and manipulation imposed by the media. He has been quoted as saying "I organize my projects just like the media do with reality." An exhibition called Disposable Reality and presented in 2000 features a number of his three-dimensional creations, derived directly out of magazine images also displayed in the gallery. These range from an American father and son at a shooting gallery to a nude blonde in front of a computer tuned to a porn website to snow leopards, Jacques Chirac, Jiang Zemin, and a Lebanese soldier bearing an AK-47.

His latest works have turned to large-scale sculptures representing crumpled up newspaper, either en masse in trash cans, buildings or other repositories, or individually, in giant exploded versions of ordinary, everyday trash.

== Solo exhibitions (selection) ==
- 2001: Museum of Contemporary Art, Chicago
- 2005: Vancouver Art Gallery
- 2005: Yerba Buena Center for the Arts (San Francisco)
- 2007: Kestnergesellschaft (Hannover)
- 2009: Ullens Center for Contemporary Art (Beijing)
- 2010: Viersen sculpture collection

== Group exhibitions (selection) ==
- 1998: MoMA PS1 (New York)
- 1999: Venice Biennale
- 2000: Taipei Biennial
- 2001: Kiasma (Helsinki)
- 2003: Kunsthalle Wien
- 2007: Musée National d'Art Moderne (Paris)
- 2008: Art Basel
- 2009: Grand Palais (Paris)

== Secondary literature ==
- Uta Grosenick, Caspar Schübbe (Editor): China Art (English / German / Chinese). Dumont, Köln 2007, ISBN 3-8321-7769-8
- Joachim Peter Kastner (Editor): Wang Du. China Daily, Services top task for Games. Skulpturensammlung Viersen. Viersen 2010, ISBN 978-3-9813463-1-2
