= Dülken =

- Borough of Viersen
- Coat of arms
- Interactive map of Dülken
- Location within Germany Location within North Rhine-Westphalia
- Coordinates: 51°15′08″N 6°20′07″E
- Country: Germany
- State: North Rhine-Westphalia
- District: Viersen
- Town: Viersen

Area
  - Total: 24.97 km^{2} (9.64 sq mi)
- Elevation: 54 m (177 ft)

Population (2020)
  - Total: 20,469
  - Density: 819.7/km^{2} (2,123/sq mi)
- Time zone: UTC+01:00 (CET)
  - Summer (DST): UTC+02:00 (CEST)
- Postal codes: 41751
- Dialling codes: 02162

Dülken (German pronunciation: [ˈdʏlkn̩]) is a town located in the North Rhine-Westphalia state of Germany. It has a population of about 20,000. It is a borough of the municipality of Viersen. It received its town charter in 1364 thus being the oldest part of the municipality of Viersen. It lies in the administrative region of Düsseldorf. The river Nette having its source underground in the middle of the town rises near the town. The town motto is, "Gloria tibi Duelken", or "Glory to you, Duelken".

== History ==
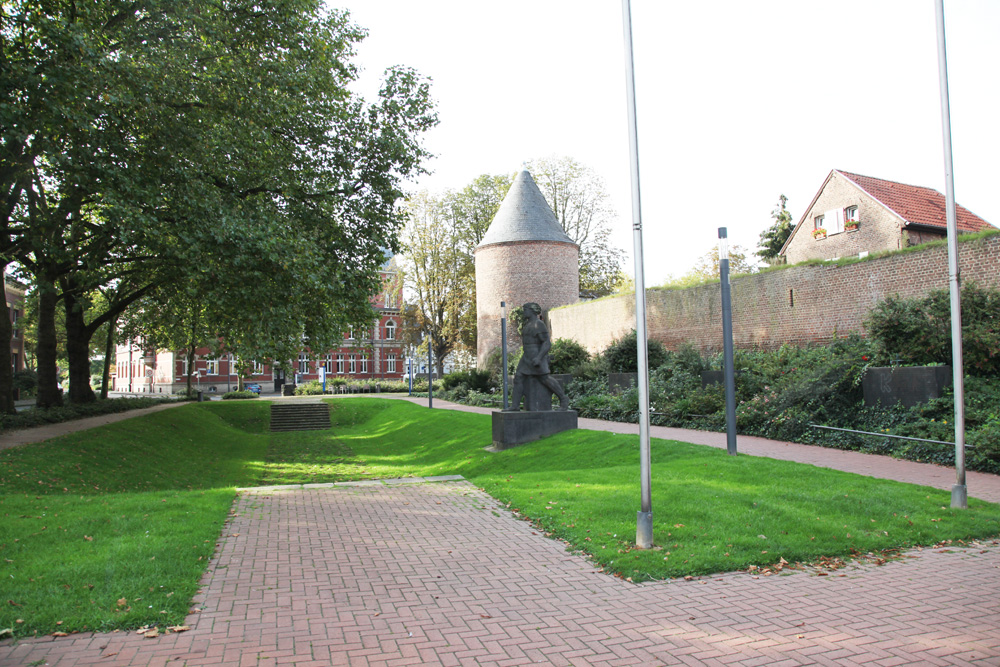
Parts of the old city fortification

Julianstein, a part of Dülken, is first mentioned 1135. Dülken itself appears in historic records 1210. The town was officially chartered as a city between 1352 and 1364. First Hilgers are dated to the time before the Roman Empire by tribes of Swenjans and Sandras. Romans occupied the lower Rhineland and dislodged tribes that were not willing to cooperate until they finally withdrew in the second half of the 5th century. The Franks incurred the area as a County and ruled until about the 10th century. Due to different claims to power and political tensions, Dülken was heavily fortified since 1400 with a city wall, watchtowers and ditches.

In the Thirty Years' War Dülken was briefly occupied by Spanish troops. During the First French Empire French troops occupied the city which officially became a French municipality of the Roer (department) between 1794 until 1814. With Napoleon`s defeat, Dülken was assigned to the Prussia`s Rhine Province. Except of a brief Belgian occupation between 1919 and 1930 (Occupation of the Rhineland), the town became first prussian, later a part of the German empire, finally of modern Germany. In 1945 towards the end of World War II, Dülken was conquered by the 9th US army and became part of as well Operation Grenade as of the Ghost Army in Operation Viersen, pretending a crossing over the Rhine close to Düsseldorf.

== Economy ==
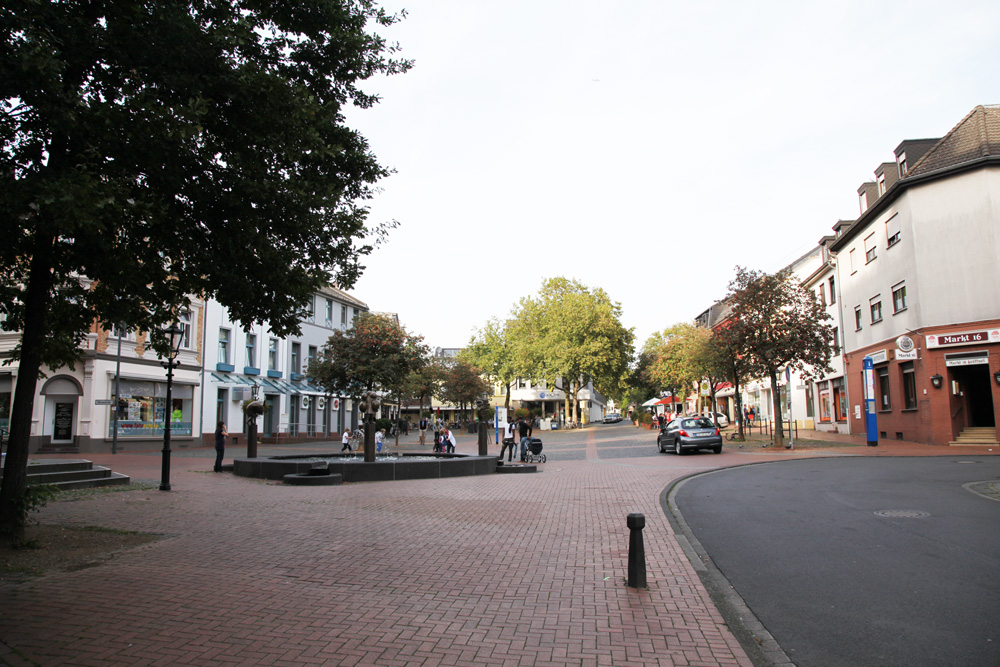
Market square of Dülken

Having a long history in textiles and fabrics, Dülken's economy has shifted since the 1920s towards engineering and since the 1970s towards various branches situated in the business park and industrial area Mackenstein. Simultaneously, a multitude of small and medium enterprises arose. With the closure of some engineering companies, the former factories were transformed into a number of smaller workshops and plants, a lot specialized in metal machining. Today (2014) the industrial area Mackenstein is going to be extended from Dülken to Mönchengladbach, reaching towards the Autobahn 52, in total a couple of a hundred acres additional to today's approximately 350 acres (140 ha).

Big employers or important companies are Otto Fuchs Metallwerke (brass and bronze products, automotive supply), KraussMaffei (tooling technology), Mars (sweets, chocolate bars), Schwarzkopf Henkel (cosmetics), Dietermann (metal casting), Weyermann (textiles), Maxicard (credit card manufacturing), Peri (construction), Hoeren (construction), Doka (construction systems), DHL (logistics), Sturm (logistics), Knauf AMF (ceiling, windows).

In addition, there is a wide range of specialized companies present in Dülken from programming of industrial robots by Eule Robotics, gas and water utility technology from Dresser Europe, to water purification by Kurita Europe.

Several small and medium IT-companies supply programming and customizing of systems and networks. Craftsmen and workshops provide component supply for different branches like automotive and / or engineering.

The surroundings of Dülken are rural. Farmers grow the usual products of the Lower Rhine region plus a growing number of vegetables and fruits according to organic farming guidelines.

== Education ==
Dülken has basic schools, three secondary schools (Gymnasium (Germany)) and a professional school for craftspeople, commercial tasks, healthcare and administration. A new type of school, the primus school was established 2014. Contrary to the split of pupils (after finishing primary school) into different levels of secondary schools in Germany, students can stay together until the 10th class.

== Traffic ==
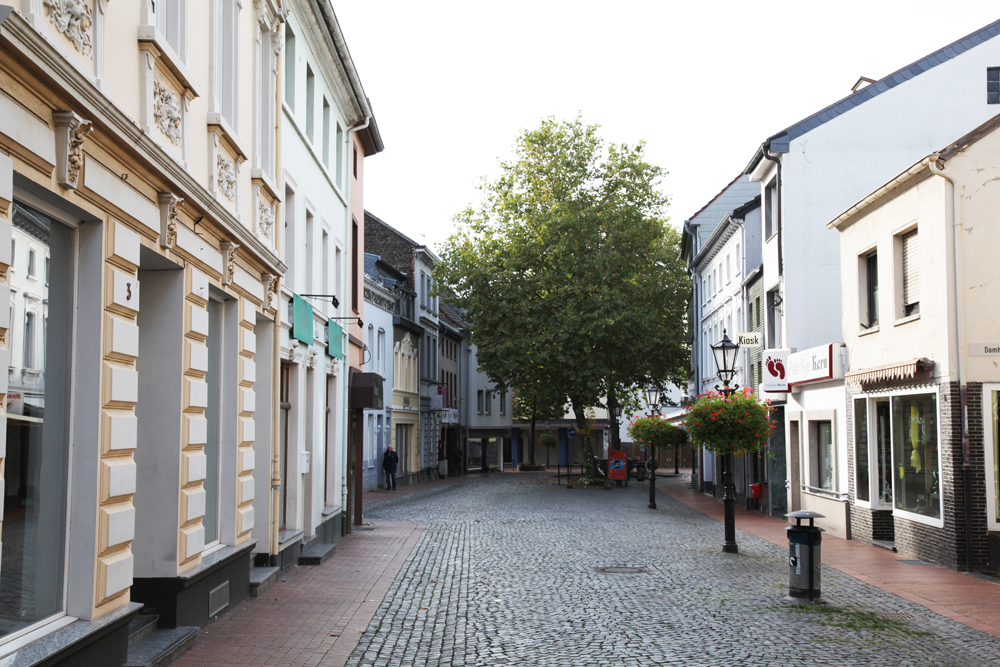
Old town

Two Autobahnen (motorways, interstates) touch Dülken, the A61 from Koblenz and the Cologne area to Venlo, Netherlands and the A52 from Düsseldorf to Roermond, Netherlands. 4 exits connect the area.

Several bus lines connect Dülken to Viersen, Mönchengladbach and Düsseldorf as well as the complete back country towards the Dutch border.

A train line runs from Cologne and Düsseldorf to Venlo with one or two passenger trains per hour in every direction from station Dülken.

Major airports in the vicinity are Düsseldorf Airport DUS at about 40 kilometers, Weeze Airport NRN within 50 kilometers, Maastricht Aachen Airport MST in 70 kilometers, Cologne Bonn Airport CGN at about 80 kilometers, Eindhoven Airport EIN within 90 kilometers. In addition, the small Düsseldorf Mönchengladbach Airport MGL is suitable for business jets within 20 km.

== Recurring events ==
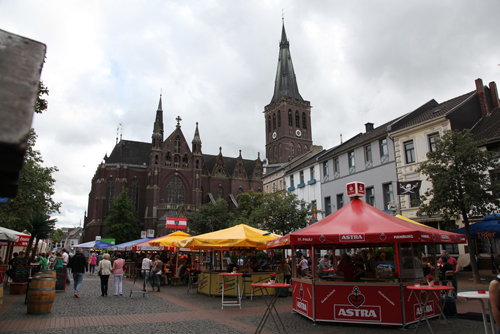
Bierbörse in Dülken – beer fair with more than 200 different beers to taste

Carnival in February is celebrated with a big parade – one of the largest in the lower rhine area with about 80,000 to 100,000 visitors, depending on weather. Before that, various carnival societies celebrate sessions with humorous songs and satiric performances.

The Dülkener Schöppenmarkt, a type of flea/junk market, which takes place on the day after the last Carnival parade on Ash Wednesday, is one of Germany's biggest.

The Dülken Bierbörse (beer fair) in July, situated on the marketplace and within the old town, offers beers from various regions and countries.

Mühlenfest (mill festival), end of August with bands and shows on the market square.

Dülkener Herbstmarkt (autumn market) begin of October. Here, local producers and traders offer various fruits and vegetables which are grown in the vicinity of the city – often very rare sorts of apples or pears. In addition, small producers sell handmade mustard, jam, or oils up to mead. Various plants and flowers are available from local nurseries.

== Objects of interest ==
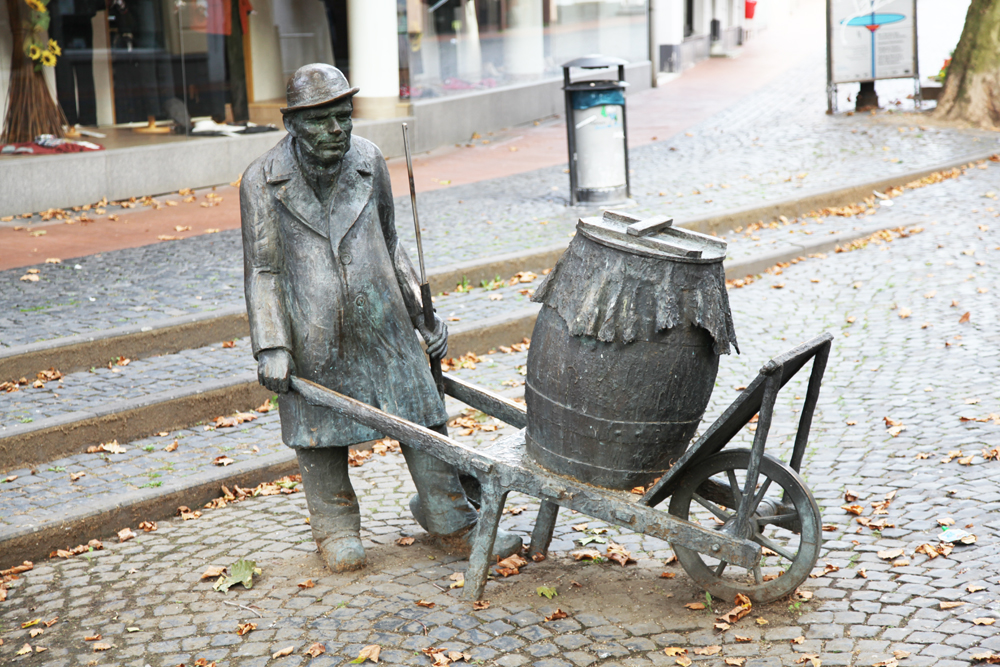
Lifesize statue for a man emptying slurry pits before 1890

The old town of Dülken consists of mainly houses from the period of Gründerzeit till about 1920 around the market square, towered above by the church of St. Cornelius, one of the biggest churches in the Lower Rhine region. Some older structures close to the former city wall date around 1720.

The Narrenmühle "fools' wind mill" is domicile for a Carnival society: Narrenakademie "fools' academy" with the moon as coat of arms. This is one of the oldest carnival societies worldwide, dating back to 1554. The fool's academy provides diplomas as "doctor humoris causa", e.g. for Salvador Dalí, Neil Armstrong, Konrad Adenauer, current politicians or artists and local persons. A small museum shows curiosities and historic exhibits.

Some parts of the old city fortifications (wall, watchtower, ditch).

As a curiosity, the citizens donated a life-sized bronze statue in 1980, remembering a man emptying slurry pits in the outskirts before 1890 as "an early example of outstanding service orientation". The place for this statue is more prominent than emperor Wilhelm's statue.

== Notable people ==
- Hilde Bruch (1904–1984), German-born American psychoanalyst
- Reinhard Kluth (1950–2020), church musician and composer
- Gustav von Mevissen (1815–1899), German businessman and politician
- Erik Martin (born 1936), German writer, editor, songwriter and composer of songs

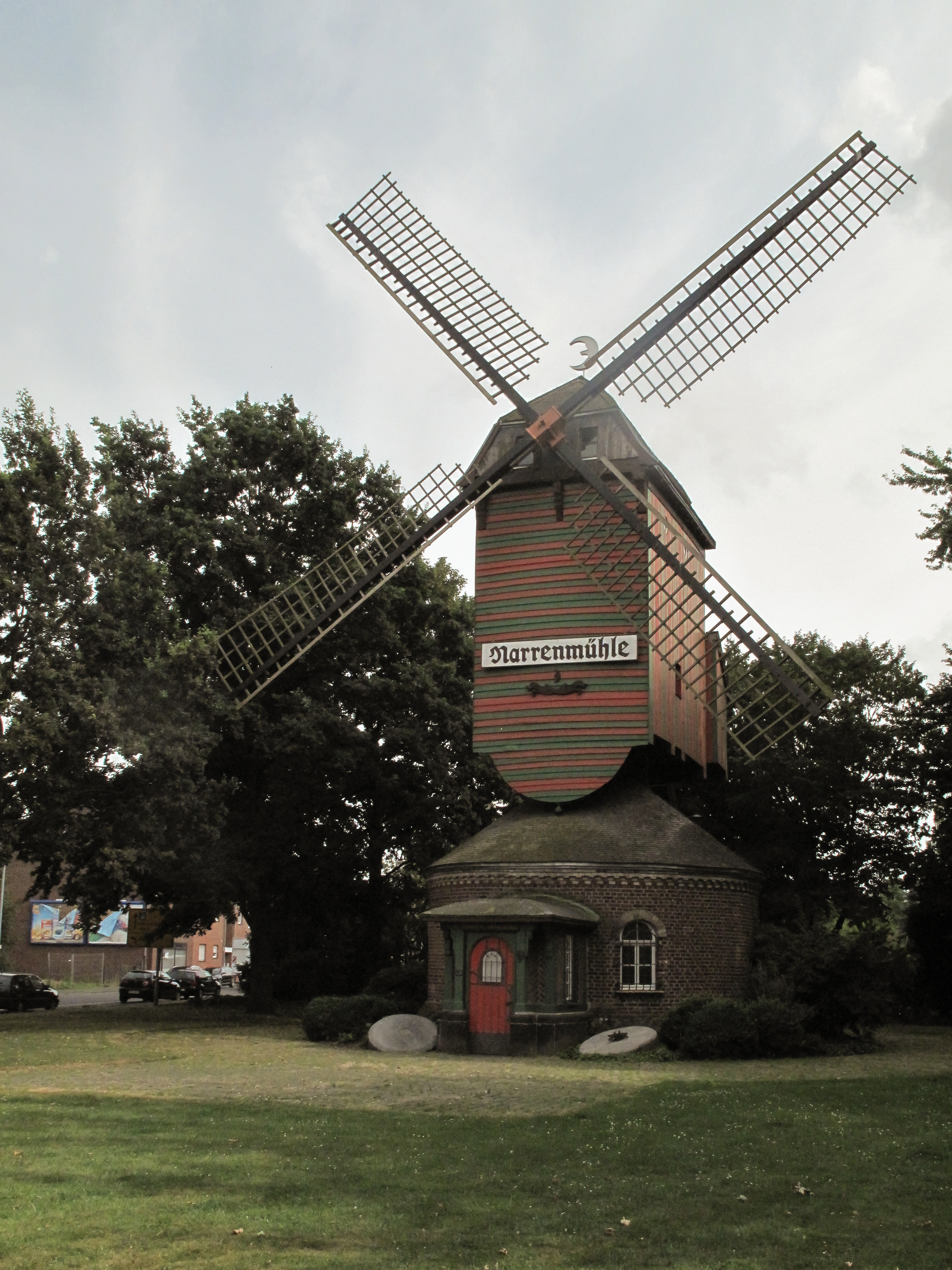
Dülken, windmill: die Narrenmühle

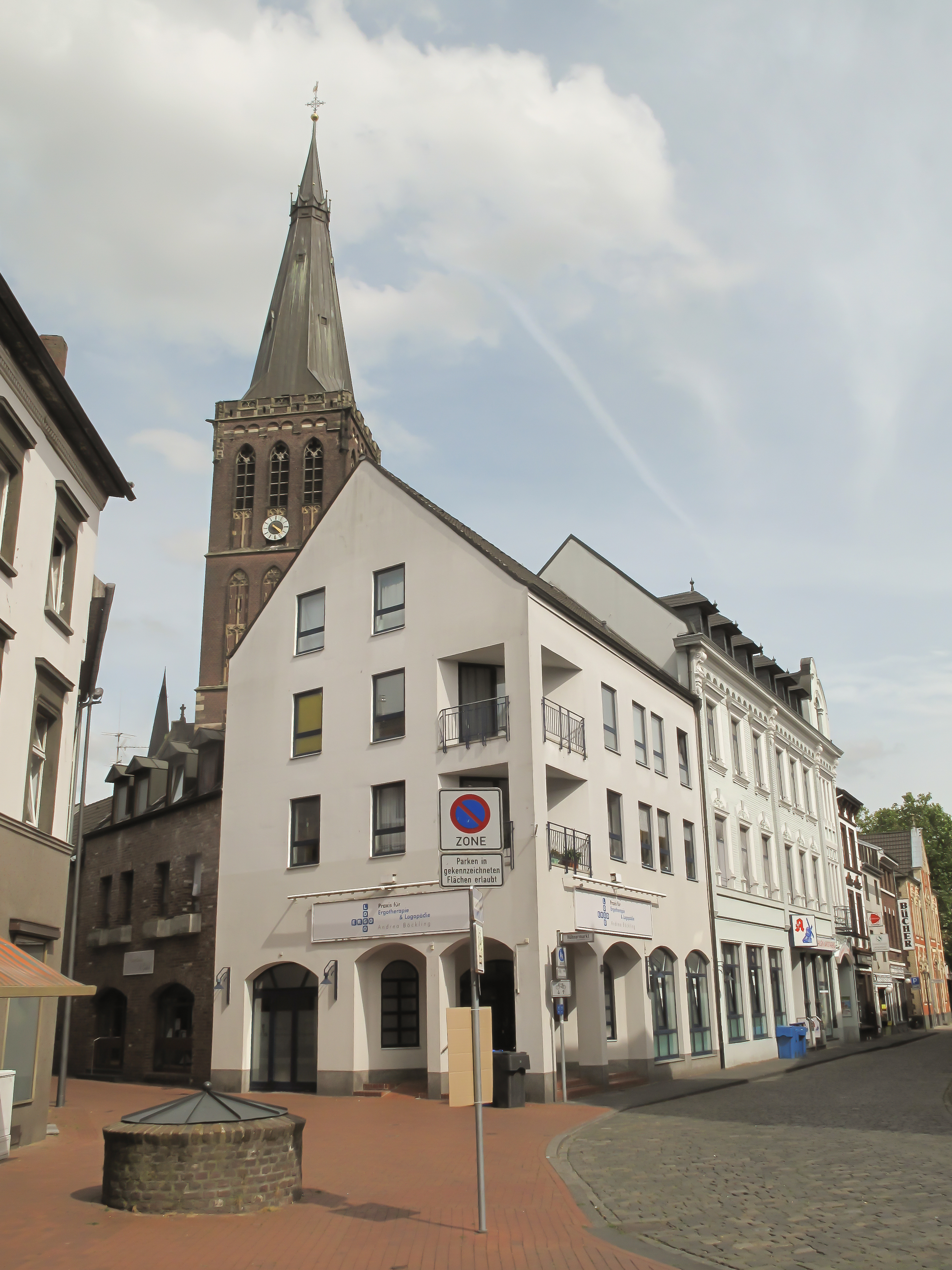
Dülken, churchtower (Pfarrkriche Sankt Cornelius) in the street

== Literature and sources ==
- Geschichte der Stadt Dülken (chronicles of Dülken) http://digital.ub.uni-duesseldorf.de/ihd/content/titleinfo/1673945 Peter Norrenberg, Baedeker Verlag 1874, Viersen, digitized at University of Düsseldorf.
- Arie Nabrings: Dülken einst und jetzt. Ein Bild- und Textband zur Geschichte der Stadt. Stadtarchiv (city archive), Viersen 1993, ISBN 3-928298-04-6.
- Arie Nabrings: Die Dülkener Narrenmühle und das Museum Narrenakademie Dülken. The fool`s academy and her story, 2002.
- Werner Mellen: Viersen-Dülken. (= Rheinische Kunststätten, Band ###.) Köln 1987, ISBN 3-88094-587-X.
- André Schmitz: Napoleon in Dülken. Stories from the nightwatch by André Schmitz. Dülken. Iris Kater Verlag 2014. ISBN 978-3-944514-10-9
- Norbert Bonus, Eleonore Föhles: Geselliges Leben in Dülken. Schankwirtschaften, Gasthöfe und Restaurationen vom 19. Jahrhundert bis zur Gegenwart. Stadtarchiv (city archive), Viersen 1991, ISBN 3-928298-02-X.
- Walther Föhl: Sechs Jahrhunderte Stadt Dülken. Six centuries of Dülken, Stadtverwaltung (city council), Dülken 1964.
- René Franken: St. Cornelius Dülken. Schnell & Steiner, Regensburg 1994.
- René Franken: Kirchenbau, Kulturkampf und Vatikanum. Eine Bau- und Entwicklungsgeschichte der Pfarrkirche St. Cornelius in Viersen Dülken. Pfarrgemeinde St. Cornelius Viersen Dülken, Viersen 2008, ISBN 978-3-00-024935-8.
- Karl L. Mackes: Rheinischer Städteatlas: Dülken. Habelt, Bonn 1979, ISBN 3-79270477-3.
- Klaus Marcus: Die letzten Tage Viersen Dülken, Süchteln.. Reports of the events in March 1945 when Dülken was conquered by the 9th US army, second edition, 1984.
