= Viersen Jazz Festival =

The Viersen Jazz Festival is a music festival held every autumn in Viersen, North Rhine-Westphalia, Germany. It was established in 1969 as 1. Internationales Niederrheinisches Jazz Festival.

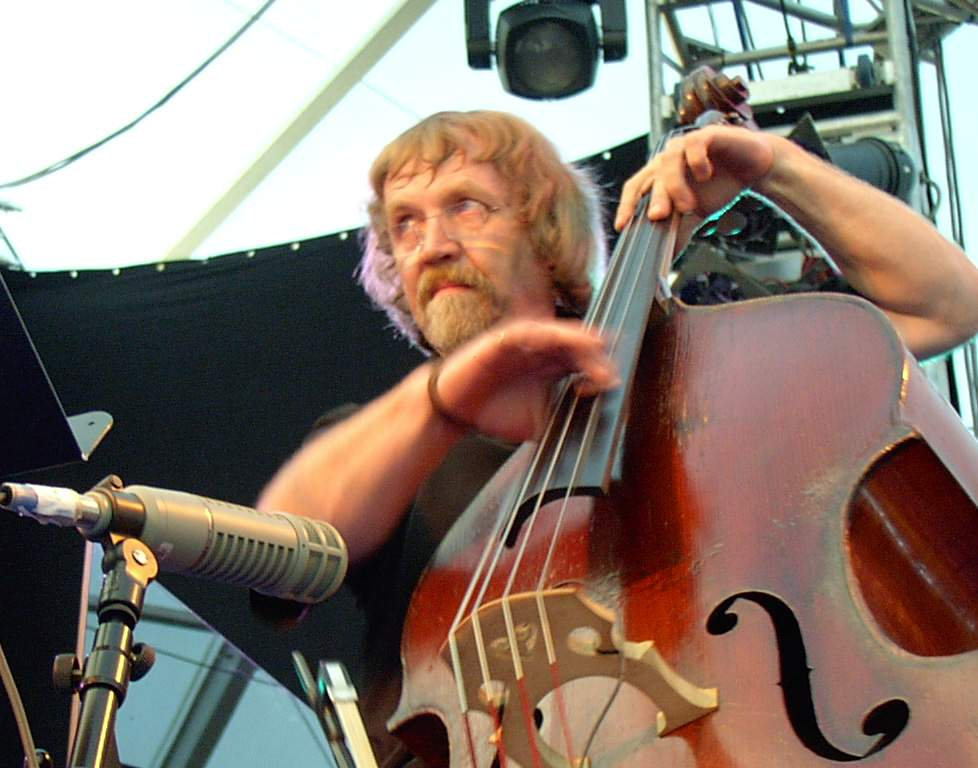
Art Director of the Festival, Ali Haurand

== History ==
After the first year it took almost 18 years till the festival continued in 1987 with double bassist Ali Haurand as artistic director. The festival is held on the fourth weekend in September in the city hall of Viersen and enjoyed nationwide a good reputation. The festival offers a high-quality set of well-known jazz musicians from overseas, Europe and Germany. The most famous performances in the festival's history include Chick Corea, Charlie Mariano, Joe Zawinul, Billy Cobham, Stéphane Grappelli, Ron Carter, Chris Potter, Jean-Luc Ponty, Ahmad Jamal, Gonzalo Rubalcaba, Joachim Kühn, Sheila Jordan with Cameron Brown, Philip Catherine, Maria João, Candy Dulfer, Barbara Dennerlein, Daniel Humair, and others more.

Most of the festivals are shown on German television and also broadcast as radio concerts.
