= 5th Saturn Awards =

US film and television awards ceremony

- Date: January 14, 1978
- Site: California, U.S.
- Hosted by: Karen Black; William Shatner

Highlights
- Most awards: Star Wars (13)
- Most nominations: Star Wars (12)

The 5th Saturn Awards were awarded to media properties and personalities deemed by the Academy of Science Fiction, Fantasy and Horror Films to be the best in science fiction, fantasy and horror released in 1977. It was held on January 14, 1978, and taped for television broadcast under the title Science Fiction Film Awards, which aired on January 21, 1978. This was the first ceremony in which the nominees for the acting categories were more than just a single individual while the category Best Editing was introduced. The event was hosted by Karen Black and William Shatner.

Star Wars won the most awards with eight, including Best Science Fiction Film, Best Director (George Lucas) and Best Writing (Lucas). Additionally, the Academy gave it five special non-competitive awards to reward the film's art direction, cinematography, editing, set decoration, and sound. Other winners included Close Encounters of the Third Kind, The Little Girl Who Lives Down the Lane, and Oh, God! with two wins each.

This ceremony is also notable for Shatner performing a spoken word rendition of "Rocket Man", introduced by Bernie Taupin.

== Winners and nominees ==
Below is a complete list of nominees and winners. Winners are highlighted in boldface.

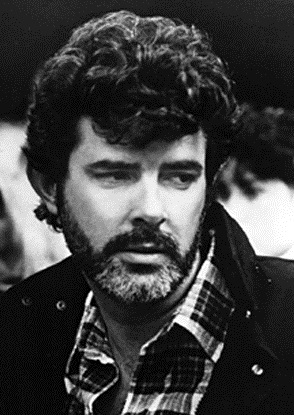
George Lucas, Best Director co-winner and Best Writing winner

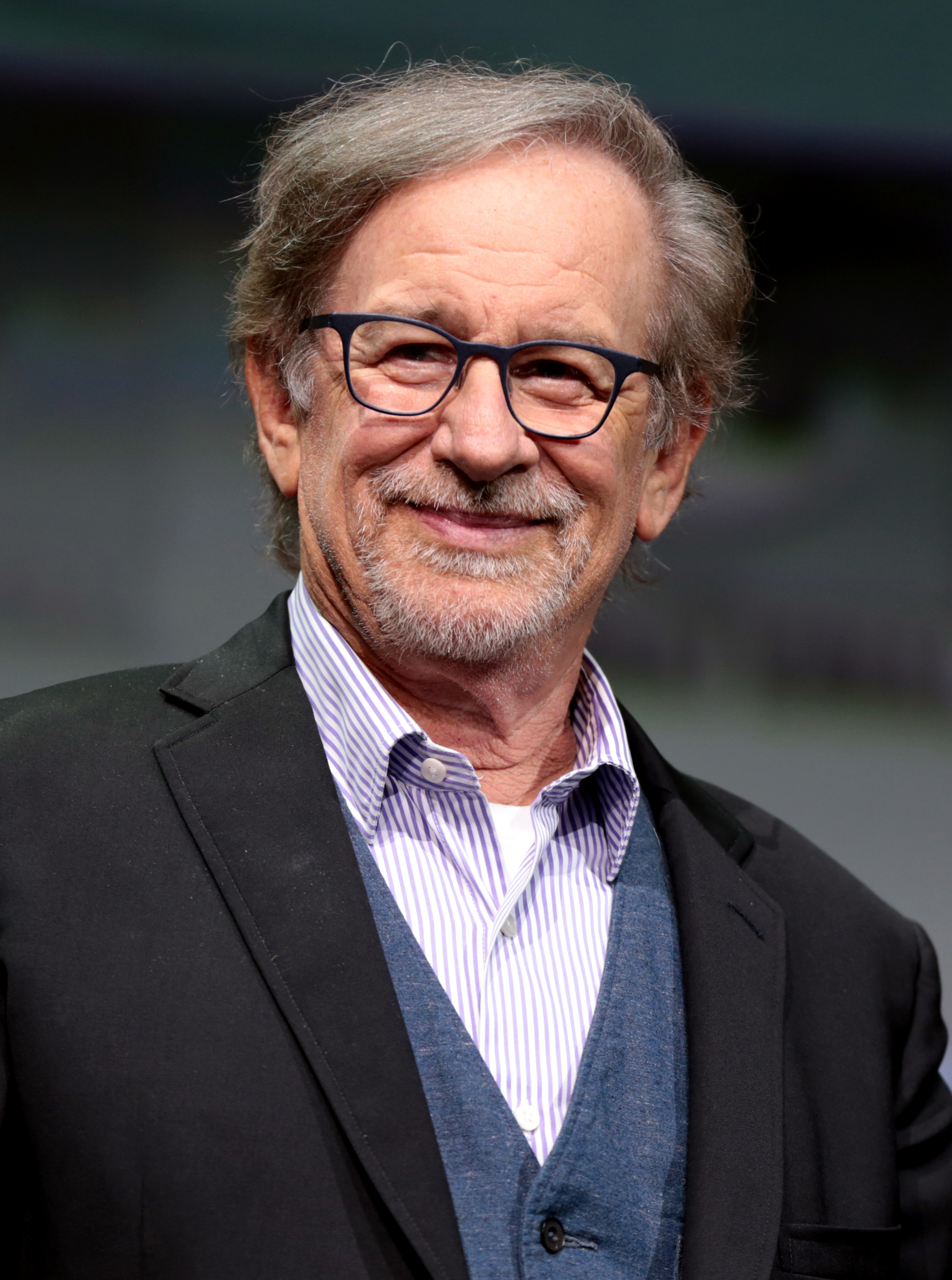
Steven Spielberg, Best Director co-winner

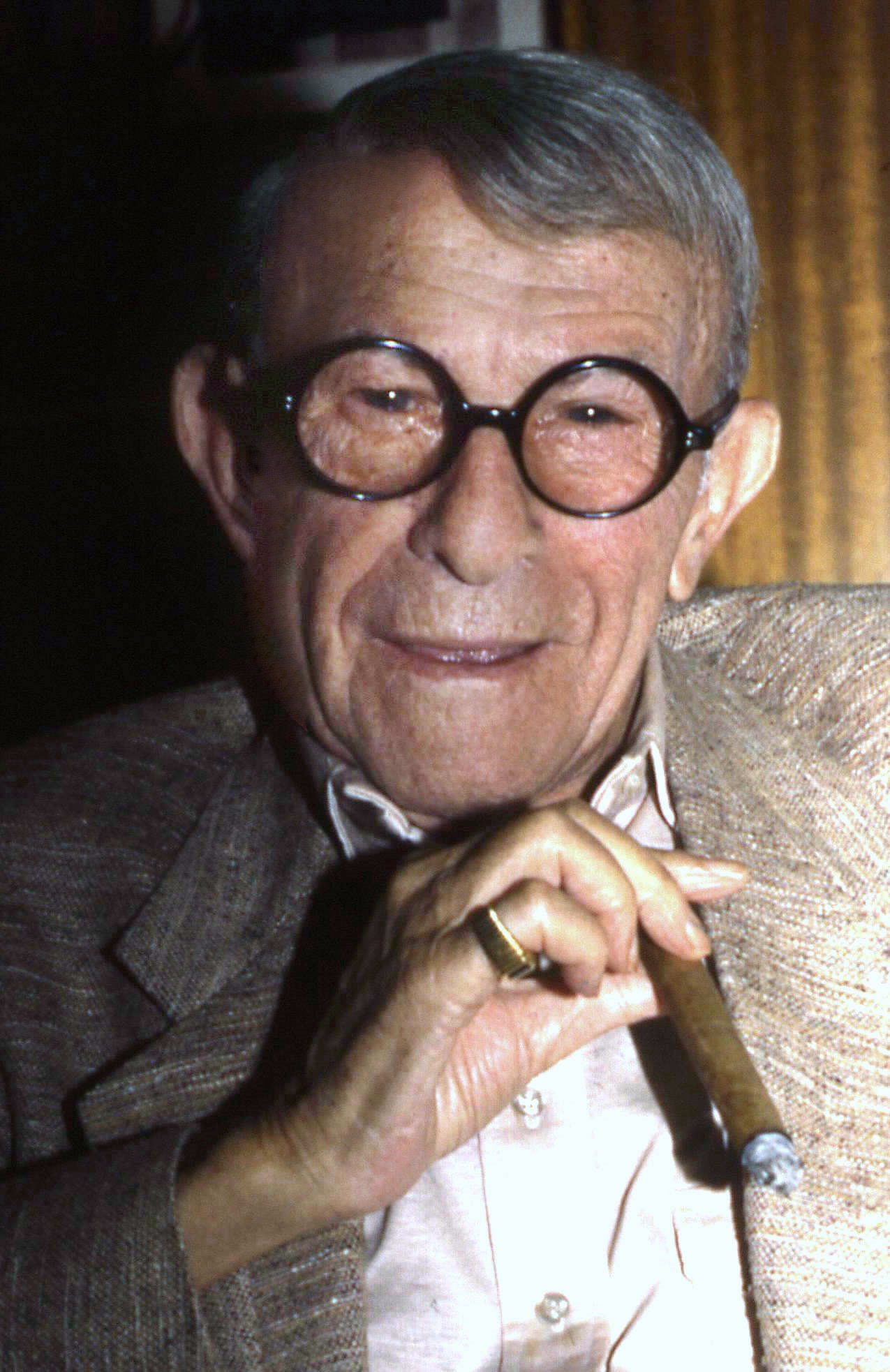
George Burns, Best Actor winner

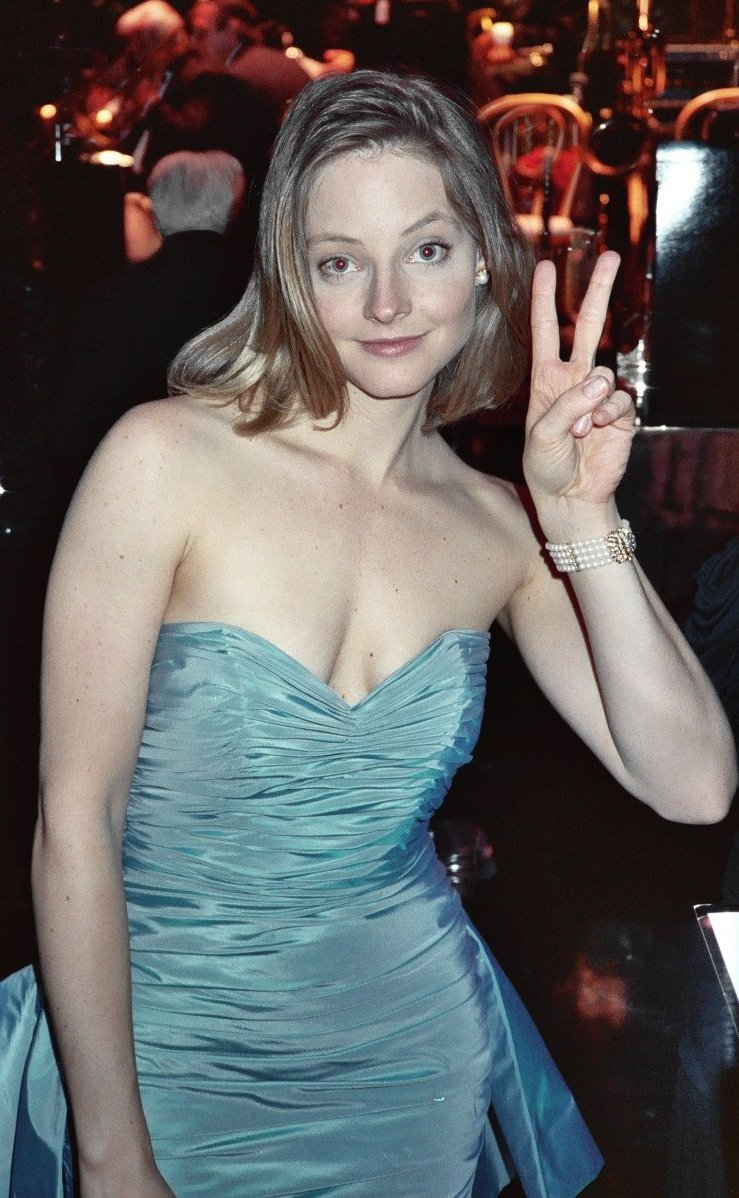
Jodie Foster, Best Actress winner

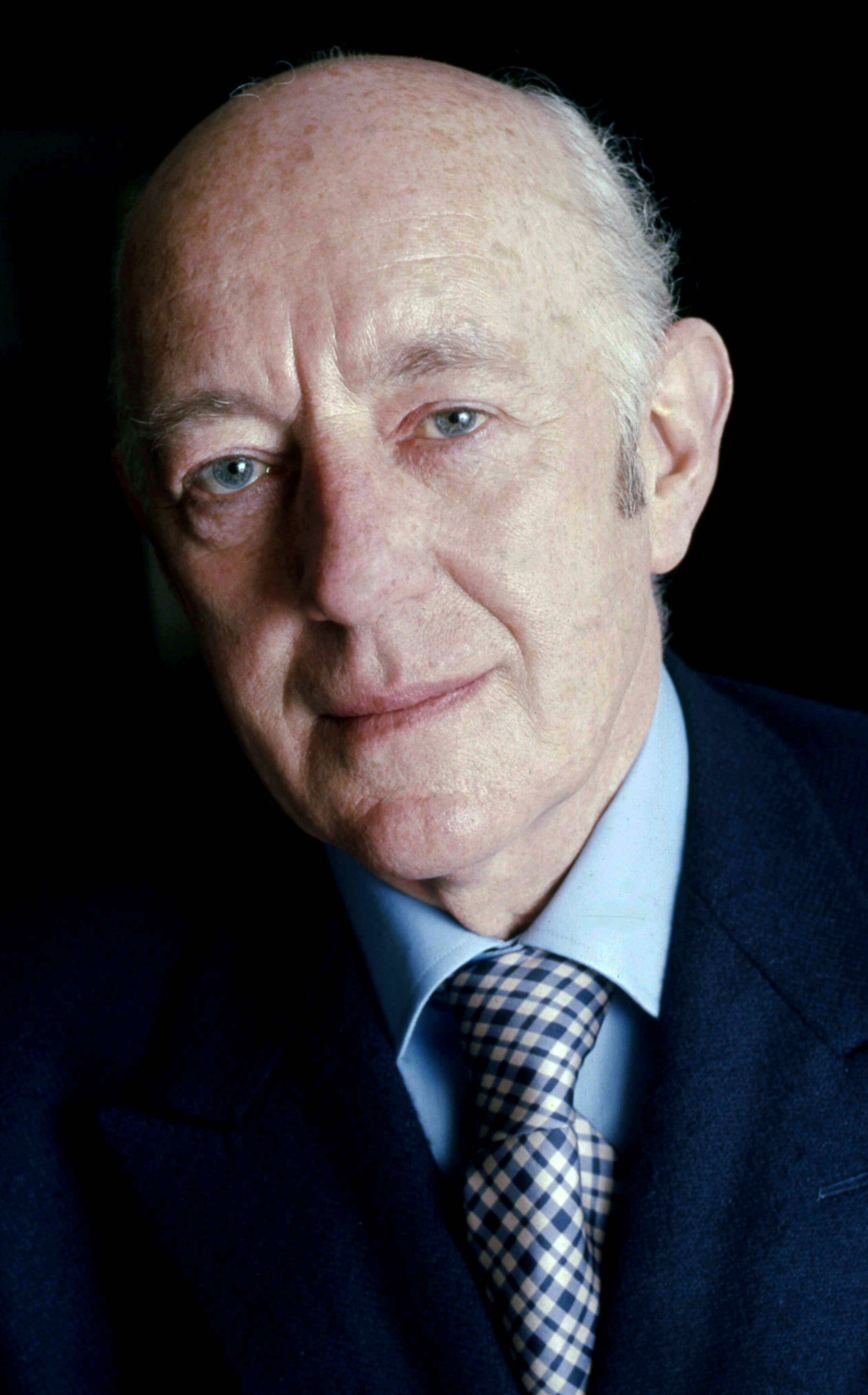
Alec Guinness, Best Supporting Actor winner

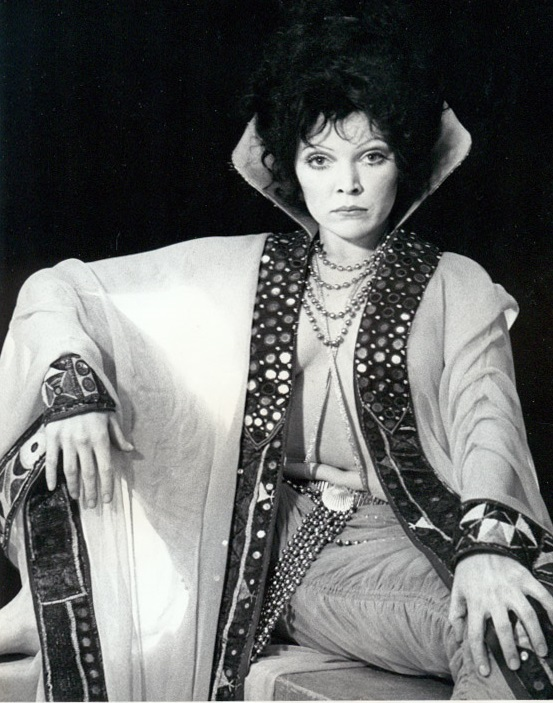
Susan Tyrrell, Best Supporting Actress winner

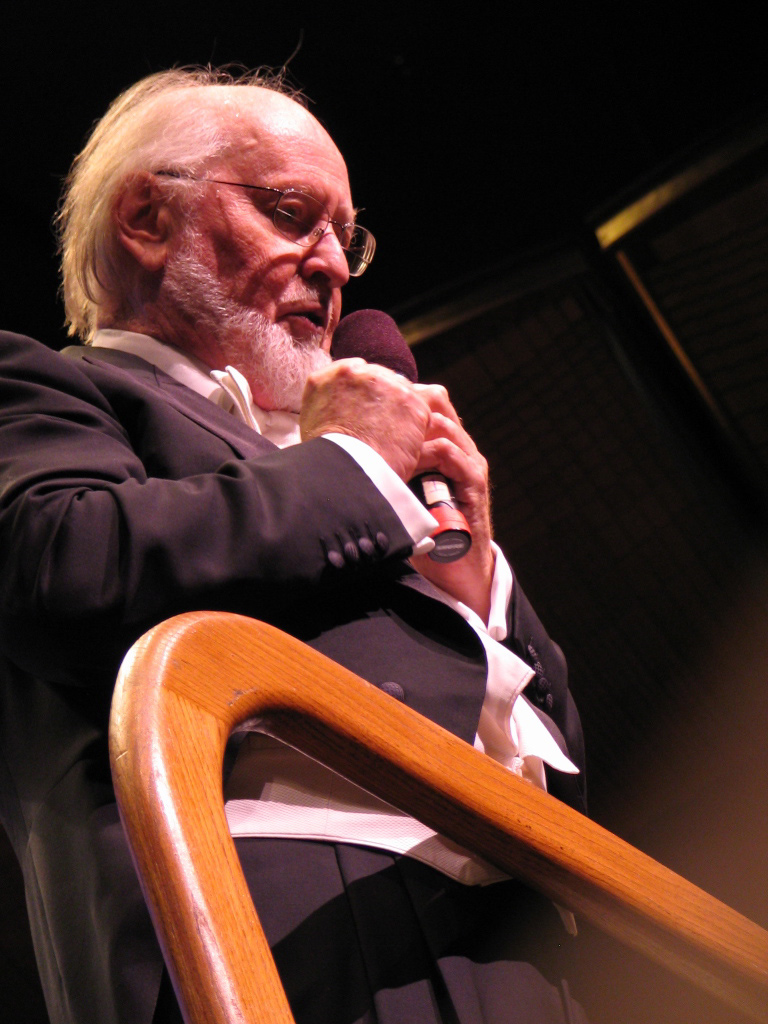
John Williams, Best Music winner

Best Science Fiction Film	Best Fantasy Film
**Star Wars**; Close Encounters of the Third Kind; Demon Seed; The Island of Dr. Moreau; Twilight's Last Gleaming	**Oh, God!**; Pete's Dragon; Sinbad and the Eye of the Tiger; The Slipper and the Rose: The Story of Cinderella; Wizards
Best Horror Film	
**The Little Girl Who Lives Down the Lane**; Dogs; Kingdom of the Spiders; The Sentinel	
Best Actor	Best Actress
**George Burns – Oh, God! as God**; Richard Dreyfuss – Close Encounters of the Third Kind as Roy Neary; Harrison Ford – Star Wars as Han Solo; Mark Hamill – Star Wars as Luke Skywalker; William Shatner – Kingdom of the Spiders as Dr. Robert "Rack" Hansen; Michael York – The Island of Dr. Moreau as Andrew Braddock	**Jodie Foster – The Little Girl Who Lives Down the Lane as Rynn Jacobs**; Julie Christie – Demon Seed as Susan Harris; Joan Collins – Empire of the Ants as Marilyn Fryser; Melinda Dillon – Close Encounters of the Third Kind as Jillian Guiler; Carrie Fisher – Star Wars as Princess Leia Organa
Best Supporting Actor	Best Supporting Actress
**Alec Guinness – Star Wars as Ben Obi-Wan Kenobi**; Red Buttons – Pete's Dragon as Hoagy; Peter Cushing – Star Wars as Grand Moff Tarkin; Burgess Meredith – The Sentinel as Charles Chazen; Woody Strode – Kingdom of the Spiders as Walter Colby	**Susan Tyrrell – Bad as Mary Aiken**; Joan Bennett – Suspiria as Madame Blanc; Teri Garr – Close Encounters of the Third Kind as Veronica Neary; Alexis Smith – The Little Girl Who Lives Down the Lane as Cora Hallet; Margaret Whiting – Sinbad and the Eye of the Tiger as Zenobia
Best Director	Best Writing
**George Lucas – Star Wars (TIE)**; **Steven Spielberg – Close Encounters of the Third Kind (TIE)**; Nicolas Gessner – The Little Girl Who Lives Down the Lane; Carl Reiner – Oh, God!; Don Taylor – The Island of Dr. Moreau	**George Lucas – Star Wars**; Larry Gelbart – Oh, God!; Laird Koenig – The Little Girl Who Lives Down the Lane; Jeffrey Konvitz and Michael Winner – The Sentinel; Steven Spielberg – Close Encounters of the Third Kind
Best Music	Best Costumes
**John Williams – Star Wars / John Williams – Close Encounters of the Third Kind (TIE)**	**John Mollo – Star Wars**; Julie Harris – The Slipper and the Rose: The Story of Cinderella; Chuck Keehne and Emily Sundby – Pete's Dragon; Richard La Motte – The Island of Dr. Moreau; Cynthia Tingey – Sinbad and the Eye of the Tiger
Best Make-up	Best Special Effects
**Rick Baker and Stuart Freeborn – Star Wars**; Thomas R. Burman – Demon Seed; John Chambers – The Island of Dr. Moreau; Dick Smith – The Sentinel; Bob Westmoreland, Thomas R. Burman, and Carlo Rambaldi – Close Encounters of the Third Kind	**John Dykstra and John Stears – Star Wars**; Ray Harryhausen – Sinbad and the Eye of the Tiger; Douglas Trumbull – Close Encounters of the Third Kind; Albert Whitlock and Chuck Gaspar (Van der Veer Photo Effects) – Exorcist II: The Heretic
Special awards
Outstanding Art Direction	Outstanding Cinematographer
**Norman Reynolds and Leslie Dilley – Star Wars**	**Gilbert Taylor – Star Wars**
Outstanding Editing	Outstanding Recording
**Paul Hirsch, Marcia Lucas, and Richard Chew – Star Wars**	**Caedmon Records**
Outstanding Set Decoration	Outstanding Sound
**Roger Christian – Star Wars**	**Ben Burtt, Don MacDougall, and Sam F. Shaw – Star Wars**
Outstanding Stop Motion Animated Film	Outstanding Television Performance
**Sinbad and the Eye of the Tiger**	**Jonathan Harris**
Outstanding Executive Achievement	Outstanding Publicist
**Richard Albain Jr.**	**Charley Lippincott**
Life Career Award	Honorary Award
**Carl Laemmle Jr.**	**Donald A. Reed**
Hall of Fame Award
**George Pal** / **The War of the Worlds** (for its 25th anniversary)
