= Saturn Award for Best Writing =

Screenplay award

- Awarded for: Best writing of the year for a genre film
- Country: United States
- Presented by: Academy of Science Fiction, Fantasy and Horror Films
- First award: 1973
- Currently held by: James Cameron, Rick Jaffa and Amanda Silver for Avatar: Fire and Ash (2024/2025)
- Website: www.saturnawards.org

The Saturn Awards for Best Writing is a Saturn Award presented by the Academy of Science Fiction, Fantasy and Horror Films.

Unlike most awards rewarding writing in films, it recognizes only the writer(s) of the screenplay, and not those of the story.

== Winners and nominees ==
=== 1970s ===
Year	Writer(s)	Motion Picture
1973 (2nd)	William Peter Blatty	The Exorcist
1974/1975 (3rd)	Harlan Ellison (for his career)	
1974/1975 (3rd)	Ib Melchior (for his career)	
1976 (4th)	Jimmy Sangster (for his career)	
1977 (5th)	George Lucas	Star Wars
1977 (5th)	Larry Gelbart	Oh, God!
1977 (5th)	Laird Koenig	The Little Girl Who Lives Down the Lane
1977 (5th)	Steven Spielberg	Close Encounters of the Third Kind
1977 (5th)	Michael Winner and Jeffrey Konvitz	The Sentinel
1978 (6th)	Elaine May and Warren Beatty	Heaven Can Wait
1978 (6th)	Heywood Gould	The Boys from Brazil
1978 (6th)	Cliff Green	Picnic at Hanging Rock
1978 (6th)	Rosemary Ritvo and Alfred Sole	Alice, Sweet Alice (Communion)
1978 (6th)	Anthony Shaffer	The Wicker Man
1979 (7th)	Nicholas Meyer	Time After Time
1979 (7th)	Jerry Juhl and Jack Burns	The Muppet Movie
1979 (7th)	Robert Kaufman	Love at First Bite
1979 (7th)	Dan O'Bannon	Alien
1979 (7th)	Jeb Rosebrook and Gerry Day	The Black Hole

=== 1980s ===
Year	Writer(s)	Motion Picture
1980 (8th)	William Peter Blatty	The Ninth Configuration
1980 (8th)	Sidney Aaron	Altered States
1980 (8th)	Leigh Brackett (posthumous nomination) and Lawrence Kasdan	The Empire Strikes Back
1980 (8th)	Lewis John Carlino	Resurrection
1980 (8th)	John Sayles	Alligator
1981 (9th)	Lawrence Kasdan	Raiders of the Lost Ark
1981 (9th)	David Eyre and Michael Wadleigh	Wolfen
1981 (9th)	Peter Hyams	Outland
1981 (9th)	John Landis	An American Werewolf in London
1981 (9th)	Michael Palin and Terry Gilliam	Time Bandits
1982 (10th)	Melissa Mathison	E.T. the Extra-Terrestrial
1982 (10th)	Jay Presson Allen	Deathtrap
1982 (10th)	Terry Hayes, George Miller and Brian Hannant	Mad Max 2
1982 (10th)	Tom Karnowski, John Stuckmeyer and Albert Pyun	The Sword and the Sorcerer
1982 (10th)	Jack B. Sowards	Star Trek II: The Wrath of Khan
1983 (11th)	Ray Bradbury	Something Wicked This Way Comes
1983 (11th)	Jeffrey Boam	The Dead Zone
1983 (11th)	William Condon and Michael Laughlin	Strange Invaders
1983 (11th)	Lawrence Kasdan and George Lucas	Return of the Jedi
1983 (11th)	Lawrence Lasker, Walter F. Parkes	WarGames
1984 (12th)	James Cameron and Gale Anne Hurd	The Terminator
1984 (12th)	Chris Columbus	Gremlins
1984 (12th)	Alex Cox	Repo Man
1984 (12th)	Willard Huyck and Gloria Katz	Indiana Jones and the Temple of Doom
1984 (12th)	Earl Mac Rauch	The Adventures of Buckaroo Banzai Across the 8th Dimension
1985 (13th)	Tom Holland	Fright Night
1985 (13th)	Woody Allen	The Purple Rose of Cairo
1985 (13th)	Tom Benedek	Cocoon
1985 (13th)	Chris Columbus	Young Sherlock Holmes
1985 (13th)	Terry Hayes and George Miller	Mad Max 3: Beyond Thunderdome
1986 (14th)	James Cameron	Aliens
1986 (14th)	Howard Ashman	Little Shop of Horrors
1986 (14th)	Nick Castle	The Boy Who Could Fly
1986 (14th)	Paul Hogan, Ken Shadie and John Cornell	"Crocodile" Dundee
1986 (14th)	Steve Meerson, Peter Krikes, Harve Bennett and Nicholas Meyer	Star Trek IV: The Voyage Home
1987 (15th)	Edward Neumeier, Michael Miner	RoboCop
1987 (15th)	Michael Cristofer	The Witches of Eastwick
1987 (15th)	James Dearden	Fatal Attraction
1987 (15th)	William Goldman	The Princess Bride
1987 (15th)	Bob Hunt	The Hidden
1987 (15th)	Alan Parker	Angel Heart
1988 (16th)	Gary Ross and Anne Spielberg	Big
1988 (16th)	David Cronenberg and Norman Snider	Dead Ringers
1988 (16th)	Don Mancini, John Lafia and Tom Holland	Child's Play
1988 (16th)	Michael McDowell and Warren Skaaren	Beetlejuice
1988 (16th)	Alan B. McElroy	Halloween 4: The Return of Michael Myers
1988 (16th)	Jeffrey Price and Peter S. Seaman	Who Framed Roger Rabbit
1989/90 (17th)	William Peter Blatty	The Exorcist III
1989/90 (17th)	Jerry Belson	Always
1989/90 (17th)	Jeffrey Boam	Indiana Jones and the Last Crusade
1989/90 (17th)	James Cameron	The Abyss
1989/90 (17th)	Don Jakoby and Wesley Strick	Arachnophobia
1989/90 (17th)	Phil Alden Robinson	Field of Dreams
1989/90 (17th)	Bruce Joel Rubin	Ghost
1989/90 (17th)	Ronald Shusett, Dan O'Bannon and Gary Goldman	Total Recall

=== 1990s ===
Year	Writer(s)	Motion Picture
1991 (18th)	Ted Tally	The Silence of the Lambs
1991 (18th)	Albert Brooks	Defending Your Life
1991 (18th)	James Cameron and William Wisher	Terminator 2: Judgment Day
1991 (18th)	Charles Gale	Guilty as Charged
1991 (18th)	William Goldman	Misery
1991 (18th)	Richard LaGravenese	The Fisher King
1992 (19th)	James V. Hart	Bram Stoker's Dracula
1992 (19th)	Martin Donovan and David Koepp	Death Becomes Her
1992 (19th)	Joe Eszterhas	Basic Instinct
1992 (19th)	David Giler, Walter Hill and Larry Ferguson	Alien 3
1992 (19th)	David Lynch and Robert Engels	Twin Peaks: Fire Walk with Me
1992 (19th)	Nicholas Meyer and Denny Martin Flinn	Star Trek VI: The Undiscovered Country
1992 (19th)	Bernard Rose	Candyman
1993 (20th)	Michael Crichton and David Koepp	Jurassic Park
1993 (20th)	Shane Black and David Arnott	Last Action Hero
1993 (20th)	Brent Maddock, S. S. Wilson, Gregory Hansen and Erik Hansen	Heart and Souls
1993 (20th)	Tim Metcalfe	Kalifornia
1993 (20th)	Danny Rubin and Harold Ramis	Groundhog Day
1993 (20th)	Quentin Tarantino	True Romance
1993 (20th)	Tracy Tormé	Fire in the Sky
1994 (21st)	Jim Harrison and Wesley Strick	Wolf
1994 (21st)	Scott Alexander and Larry Karaszewski	Ed Wood
1994 (21st)	Frank Darabont	The Shawshank Redemption
1994 (21st)	Steph Lady and Frank Darabont	Mary Shelley’s Frankenstein
1994 (21st)	Eric Roth	Forrest Gump
1994 (21st)	Mark Verheiden	Timecop
1995 (22nd)	Andrew Kevin Walker	Se7en
1995 (22nd)	James Cameron and Jay Cocks	Strange Days
1995 (22nd)	George Miller and Chris Noonan	Babe
1995 (22nd)	David Peoples and Janet Peoples	12 Monkeys
1995 (22nd)	Quentin Tarantino	From Dusk till Dawn
1995 (22nd)	Joss Whedon, Andrew Stanton, Joel Cohen and Alec Sokolow	Toy Story
1996 (23rd)	Kevin Williamson	Scream
1996 (23rd)	Dean Devlin and Roland Emmerich	Independence Day
1996 (23rd)	Jonathan Gems	Mars Attacks!
1996 (23rd)	The Wachowskis	Bound
1996 (23rd)	Fran Walsh and Peter Jackson	The Frighteners
1996 (23rd)	Brannon Braga and Ronald D. Moore	Star Trek: First Contact
1997 (24th)	Mike Werb and Michael Colleary	Face/Off
1997 (24th)	James V. Hart and Michael Goldenberg	Contact
1997 (24th)	Jonathan Lemkin and Tony Gilroy	The Devil's Advocate
1997 (24th)	Edward Neumeier	Starship Troopers
1997 (24th)	Matthew Robbins and Guillermo del Toro	Mimic
1997 (24th)	Ed Solomon	Men in Black
1998 (25th)	Andrew Niccol	The Truman Show
1998 (25th)	Brandon Boyce	Apt Pupil
1998 (25th)	Don Mancini	Bride of Chucky
1998 (25th)	Alex Proyas, Lem Dobbs and David S. Goyer	Dark City
1998 (25th)	Gary Ross	Pleasantville
1998 (25th)	Joseph Stefano	Psycho
1999 (26th)	Charlie Kaufman	Being John Malkovich
1999 (26th)	Ehren Kruger	Arlington Road
1999 (26th)	M. Night Shyamalan	The Sixth Sense
1999 (26th)	Stephen Sommers	The Mummy
1999 (26th)	The Wachowskis	The Matrix
1999 (26th)	Andrew Kevin Walker	Sleepy Hollow

=== 2000s ===
Year	Writer(s)	Motion Picture
2000 (27th)	David Hayter	X-Men
2000 (27th)	Toby Emmerich	Frequency
2000 (27th)	David Franzoni, John Logan and William Nicholson	Gladiator
2000 (27th)	Karey Kirkpatrick	Chicken Run
2000 (27th)	Billy Bob Thornton and Tom Epperson	The Gift
2000 (27th)	Wang Hui-ling, James Schamus, Tsai Kuo Jung	Crouching Tiger, Hidden Dragon
2001 (28th)	Steven Spielberg	A.I. Artificial Intelligence
2001 (28th)	Alejandro Amenábar	The Others
2001 (28th)	Stéphane Cabel and Christophe Gans	Brotherhood of the Wolf
2001 (28th)	Ted Elliott, Terry Rossio, Joe Stillman and Roger S. H. Schulman	Shrek
2001 (28th)	Andrew Stanton and Dan Gerson	Monsters, Inc.
2001 (28th)	Fran Walsh, Philippa Boyens and Peter Jackson	The Lord of the Rings: The Fellowship of the Ring
2002 (29th)	Scott Frank and Jon Cohen	Minority Report
2002 (29th)	Brent Hanley	Frailty
2002 (29th)	Hayao Miyazaki; Cindy Davis Hewitt and Donald H. Hewitt	Spirited Away
2002 (29th)	Mark Romanek	One Hour Photo
2002 (29th)	Hillary Seitz	Insomnia
2002 (29th)	Fran Walsh, Philippa Boyens, Stephen Sinclair and Peter Jackson	The Lord of the Rings: The Two Towers
2003 (30th)	Fran Walsh, Philippa Boyens and Peter Jackson	The Lord of the Rings: The Return of the King
2003 (30th)	Michael Dougherty, Dan Harris and David Hayter	X2
2003 (30th)	Alex Garland	28 Days Later
2003 (30th)	Heather Hach and Leslie Dixon	Freaky Friday
2003 (30th)	Andrew Stanton, Bob Peterson and David Reynolds	Finding Nemo
2003 (30th)	Quentin Tarantino	Kill Bill: Volume 1
2004 (31st)	Alvin Sargent	Spider-Man 2
2004 (31st)	Stuart Beattie	Collateral
2004 (31st)	Charlie Kaufman	Eternal Sunshine of the Spotless Mind
2004 (31st)	Steve Kloves	Harry Potter and the Prisoner of Azkaban
2004 (31st)	Brad Bird	The Incredibles
2004 (31st)	Quentin Tarantino	Kill Bill: Volume 2
2005 (32nd)	Christopher Nolan and David S. Goyer	Batman Begins
2005 (32nd)	Steve Kloves	Harry Potter and the Goblet of Fire
2005 (32nd)	David Koepp	War of the Worlds
2005 (32nd)	George Lucas	Star Wars: Episode III – Revenge of the Sith
2005 (32nd)	Ann Peacock, Andrew Adamson, Christopher Markus and Stephen McFeely	The Chronicles of Narnia: The Lion, the Witch and the Wardrobe
2005 (32nd)	Fran Walsh, Philippa Boyens and Peter Jackson	King Kong
2006 (33rd)	Michael Dougherty and Dan Harris	Superman Returns
2006 (33rd)	Andrew Birkin, Bernd Eichinger and Tom Tykwer	Perfume: The Story of a Murderer
2006 (33rd)	Guillermo del Toro	Pan's Labyrinth
2006 (33rd)	Zach Helm	Stranger than Fiction
2006 (33rd)	Neal Purvis, Robert Wade and Paul Haggis	Casino Royale
2006 (33rd)	The Wachowskis	V for Vendetta
2007 (34th)	Brad Bird	Ratatouille
2007 (34th)	Joel and Ethan Coen	No Country for Old Men
2007 (34th)	Neil Gaiman and Roger Avary	Beowulf
2007 (34th)	Michael Goldenberg	Harry Potter and the Order of the Phoenix
2007 (34th)	John Logan	Sweeney Todd: The Demon Barber of Fleet Street
2007 (34th)	Zack Snyder, Kurt Johnstad and Michael B. Gordon	300
2008 (35th)	Jonathan Nolan, Christopher Nolan	The Dark Knight
2008 (35th)	Mark Fergus, Hawk Ostby, Art Marcum and Matt Holloway	Iron Man
2008 (35th)	David Koepp, John Kamps	Ghost Town
2008 (35th)	John Ajvide Lindqvist	Let the Right One In
2008 (35th)	Eric Roth	The Curious Case of Benjamin Button
2008 (35th)	J. Michael Straczynski	Changeling
2009 (36th)	James Cameron	Avatar
2009 (36th)	Neill Blomkamp and Terri Tatchell	District 9
2009 (36th)	David Hayter and Alex Tse	Watchmen
2009 (36th)	Spike Jonze and Dave Eggers	Where the Wild Things Are
2009 (36th)	Roberto Orci and Alex Kurtzman	Star Trek
2009 (36th)	Quentin Tarantino	Inglourious Basterds

=== 2010s ===
Year	Writer(s)	Motion Picture
2010 (37th)	Christopher Nolan	Inception
2010 (37th)	Michael Arndt	Toy Story 3
2010 (37th)	Alex Garland	Never Let Me Go
2010 (37th)	Mark Heyman, Andres Heinz and John J. McLaughlin	Black Swan
2010 (37th)	Peter Morgan	Hereafter
2010 (37th)	Matt Reeves	Let Me In
2011 (38th)	Jeff Nichols	Take Shelter
2011 (38th)	J. J. Abrams	Super 8
2011 (38th)	Woody Allen	Midnight in Paris
2011 (38th)	Mike Cahill, Brit Marling	Another Earth
2011 (38th)	Rick Jaffa and Amanda Silver	Rise of the Planet of the Apes
2011 (38th)	John Logan	Hugo
2012 (39th)	Quentin Tarantino	Django Unchained
2012 (39th)	Tracy Letts	Killer Joe
2012 (39th)	David Magee	Life of Pi
2012 (39th)	Martin McDonagh	Seven Psychopaths
2012 (39th)	Joss Whedon	The Avengers
2012 (39th)	Joss Whedon and Drew Goddard	The Cabin in the Woods
2013 (40th)	Spike Jonze	Her
2013 (40th)	Joel and Ethan Coen	Inside Llewyn Davis
2013 (40th)	Alfonso Cuarón and Jonás Cuarón	Gravity
2013 (40th)	Jennifer Lee	Frozen
2013 (40th)	Simon Pegg and Edgar Wright	The World's End
2013 (40th)	Fran Walsh, Philippa Boyens, Peter Jackson and Guillermo del Toro	The Hobbit: The Desolation of Smaug
2014 (41st)	Jonathan Nolan and Christopher Nolan	Interstellar
2014 (41st)	Wes Anderson	The Grand Budapest Hotel
2014 (41st)	Damien Chazelle	Whiplash
2014 (41st)	James Gunn and Nicole Perlman	Guardians of the Galaxy
2014 (41st)	Christopher Markus and Stephen McFeely	Captain America: The Winter Soldier
2014 (41st)	Christopher McQuarrie, Jez Butterworth and John-Henry Butterworth	Edge of Tomorrow
2014 (41st)	Fran Walsh, Philippa Boyens, Peter Jackson and Guillermo del Toro	The Hobbit: The Battle of the Five Armies
2015 (42nd)	Lawrence Kasdan, J. J. Abrams and Michael Arndt	Star Wars: The Force Awakens
2015 (42nd)	Guillermo del Toro and Matthew Robbins	Crimson Peak
2015 (42nd)	Alex Garland	Ex Machina
2015 (42nd)	Drew Goddard	The Martian
2015 (42nd)	Jane Goldman and Matthew Vaughn	Kingsman: The Secret Service
2015 (42nd)	Rick Jaffa, Amanda Silver, Colin Trevorrow and Derek Connolly	Jurassic World
2015 (42nd)	George Miller, Brendan McCarthy and Nico Lathouris	Mad Max: Fury Road
2016 (43rd)	Eric Heisserer	Arrival
2016 (43rd)	Melissa Mathison (posthumously)	The BFG
2016 (43rd)	Rhett Reese & Paul Wernick	Deadpool
2016 (43rd)	Jon Spaihts, Scott Derrickson and C. Robert Cargill	Doctor Strange
2016 (43rd)	Taylor Sheridan	Hell or High Water
2016 (43rd)	Chris Weitz and Tony Gilroy	Rogue One: A Star Wars Story
2017 (44th)	Rian Johnson	Star Wars: The Last Jedi
2017 (44th)	Ryan Coogler and Joe Robert Cole	Black Panther
2017 (44th)	Guillermo del Toro and Vanessa Taylor	The Shape of Water
2017 (44th)	Hampton Fancher and Michael Green	Blade Runner 2049
2017 (44th)	Scott Frank, James Mangold and Michael Green	Logan
2017 (44th)	Allan Heinberg	Wonder Woman
2017 (44th)	Jordan Peele	Get Out
2018/2019 (45th)	Bryan Woods, Scott Beck and John Krasinski	A Quiet Place
2018/2019 (45th)	Christopher Markus and Stephen McFeely	Avengers: Endgame
2018/2019 (45th)	Drew Goddard	Bad Times at the El Royale
2018/2019 (45th)	Oh Jung-mi and Lee Chang-dong	Burning
2018/2019 (45th)	Christopher McQuarrie	Mission: Impossible – Fallout
2018/2019 (45th)	Jordan Peele	Us
2018/2019 (45th)	S. Craig Zahler	Dragged Across Concrete
2019/2020 (46th)	Quentin Tarantino	Once Upon a Time in Hollywood
2019/2020 (46th)	J. J. Abrams and Chris Terrio	Star Wars: The Rise of Skywalker
2019/2020 (46th)	Mike Flanagan	Doctor Sleep
2019/2020 (46th)	Lauren Hynek, Rick Jaffa, Elizabeth Martin, and Amanda Silver	Mulan
2019/2020 (46th)	Bong Joon-ho and Han Jin-won	Parasite
2019/2020 (46th)	Christopher Nolan	Tenet
2019/2020 (46th)	Todd Phillips and Scott Silver	Joker

=== 2020s ===
Year	Writer(s)	Film
2021/2022 (50th)	Guillermo del Toro and Kim Morgan	Nightmare Alley
2021/2022 (50th)	Scott Derrickson and C. Robert Cargill	The Black Phone
2021/2022 (50th)	Daniel Kwan and Daniel Schienert	Everything Everywhere All at Once
2021/2022 (50th)	Chris McKenna and Erik Sommers	Spider-Man: No Way Home
2021/2022 (50th)	Jordan Peele	Nope
2021/2022 (50th)	Matt Reeves and Peter Craig	The Batman
2021/2022 (50th)	James Vanderbilt and Guy Busick	Scream
2022/2023 (51st)	James Cameron, Rick Jaffa and Amanda Silver	Avatar: The Way of Water
2022/2023 (51st)	Noah Baumbach and Greta Gerwig	Barbie
2022/2023 (51st)	Seth Reiss and Will Tracy	The Menu
2022/2023 (51st)	Erik Jendresen and Christopher McQuarrie	Mission: Impossible – Dead Reckoning Part One
2022/2023 (51st)	Christopher Nolan	Oppenheimer
2022/2023 (51st)	Mia Goth and Ti West	Pearl
2023/2024 (52nd)	Oz Perkins	Longlegs
2023/2024 (52nd)	Alfred Gough and Miles Millar	Beetlejuice Beetlejuice
2023/2024 (52nd)	Shawn Levy, Ryan Reynolds, Rhett Reese, Paul Wernick, and Zeb Wells	Deadpool & Wolverine
2023/2024 (52nd)	Denis Villeneuve and Jon Spaihts	Dune: Part Two
2023/2024 (52nd)	Takashi Yamazaki	Godzilla: Minus One
2023/2024 (52nd)	Josh Friedman	Kingdom of the Planet of the Apes
2023/2024 (52nd)	JT Mollner	Strange Darling
2024/2025 (53rd)	James Cameron, Rick Jaffa and Amanda Silver	Avatar: Fire and Ash
2024/2025 (53rd)	Ryan Coogler	Sinners
2024/2025 (53rd)	Zach Cregger	Weapons
2024/2025 (53rd)	Guillermo del Toro	Frankenstein
2024/2025 (53rd)	Josh Friedman, Jeff Kaplan, Eric Pearson, and Ian Springer	The Fantastic Four: First Steps
2024/2025 (53rd)	Bryan Fuller	Dust Bunny
2024/2025 (53rd)	Erik Jendresen and Christopher McQuarrie	Mission: Impossible − The Final Reckoning

== Multiple nominations ==
8 nominations

- Guillermo del Toro
- James Cameron

7 nominations

- Peter Jackson
- Quentin Tarantino
- Fran Walsh

6 nominations

- Philippa Boyens
- Christopher Nolan

4 nominations

- Lawrence Kasdan
- David Koepp
- George Miller
- Rick Jaffa and Amanda Silver

3 nominations

- J. J. Abrams
- William Peter Blatty
- Alex Garland
- Drew Goddard
- David Hayter
- John Logan
- George Lucas
- Christopher Markus and Stephen McFeely
- Nicholas Meyer
- Jordan Peele
- Andrew Stanton
- The Wachowskis
- Christopher McQuarrie

2 nominations

- Woody Allen
- Michael Arndt
- Brad Bird
- Jeffrey Boam
- C. Robert Cargill
- Joel and Ethan Coen
- Chris Columbus
- Frank Darabont
- Scott Derrickson
- Michael Dougherty
- Scott Frank
- Tony Gilroy
- Michael Goldenberg
- William Goldman
- David S. Goyer
- Michael Green
- Dan Harris
- James V. Hart
- Terry Hayes
- Tom Holland
- Spike Jonze
- Charlie Kaufman
- Steve Kloves
- Don Mancini
- Melissa Mathison
- Edward Neumeier
- Jonathan Nolan
- Dan O'Bannon
- Matt Reeves
- Matthew Robbins
- Gary Ross
- Eric Roth
- Steven Spielberg
- Wesley Strick
- Andrew Kevin Walker
- Joss Whedon
- Rhett Reese
- Paul Wernick
- Jon Spaihts

== Multiple wins ==
5 wins

- James Cameron

4 wins

- Christopher Nolan

3 wins

- William Peter Blatty

2 wins

- Rick Jaffa and Amanda Silver
- Lawrence Kasdan
- Jonathan Nolan
- Quentin Tarantino
