= Konvitz =

Konvitz is a surname. Notable people with the surname include:

- Jeffrey Konvitz (born 1944), American attorney, writer, and film producer
- Milton R. Konvitz (1908–2003), American law professor
