= Tennessee Waltz (film) =

- Directed by: Nicolas Gessner
- Screenplay by: Laird Koenig
- Based on: Minnie oder Ein Fall von Geringfügigkeit by Hans Werner Kettenbach
- Produced by: Peter-Christian Fueter; Bernard Lang
- Starring: Julian Sands; Stacey Dash; Ned Beatty; Denise Crosby; Rod Steiger
- Cinematography: Pio Corradi
- Edited by: Marie-Thérèse Boiché
- Music by: Gabriel Yared
- Production companies: Condor Films; Allianz Filmproduktion; Intermonda; Westdeutscher Rundfunk
- Distributed by: Nelson Entertainment
- Release date: August 6, 1989 (Locarno Film Festival)
- Running time: 105 minutes
- Countries: Switzerland; United States; West Germany
- Language: English

Tennessee Waltz, also known as Tennessee Nights, is a 1989 American thriller film directed by Nicolas Gessner and starring Julian Sands, Stacey Dash, and Ed Lauter. It was adapted for the screen by Laird Koenig from the 1984 novel Minnie oder Ein Fall von Geringfügigkeit ("Minnie, or a Case of Insignificance") by Hans Werner Kettenbach.

== Premise ==
A British lawyer on holiday in Tennessee is blamed for a murder.

== Cast ==
- Julian Sands as Wolfgang Leighton
- Stacey Dash as Minnie
- Ed Lauter as Sheriff Williams
- Ned Beatty as Charlie Kiefer
- Denise Crosby as Sally Lomas
- Brian McNamara as Hewitt
- Rod Steiger as Judge Prescott
- Wallace Wilkinson as Record Producer
- Johnny Cash as himself
- David Hess as Hank
- Gary Grubbs as District Attorney
