= The Little Girl Who Lives Down the Lane (novel) =

1974 novel by Laird Koenig

- Book cover
- Author: Laird Koenig
- Language: English
- Genre: Thriller
- Publisher: Coward McCann
- Publication date: 1974
- Publication place: United States
- Pages: 254 pp

The Little Girl Who Lives Down the Lane is a 1974 novel by Laird Koenig, about a 13-year-old girl named Rynn Jacobs who lives alone in a house, and murders people who threaten her solitary life. The book was adapted into a film by same name in 1976 that starred Jodie Foster as Rynn and Martin Sheen as perverted antagonist Frank Hallet.

== Plot ==
Thirteen-year-old Rynn Jacobs, a British immigrant to America, occupies a small but comfortable house at the end of a lane in rural Long Island, New York with her frequently spoken-of yet absentee father. On Halloween night, Rynn celebrates her 13th birthday alone, but is rudely interrupted by the local town deviant and landlady's son, Frank Hallet, who claims to be out trick-or-treating with his wife's two sons (who lag considerably far behind him). Frank pesters Rynn with questions, and leers at her, attempting to pat her buttocks before she whirls around and stops him, to which he defends the act by claiming that by American custom, he gets to spank her on her birthday, before he leaves, embarrassed.

The next day, Rynn runs her usual errands in town, revealing that she lives off of traveller's cheques left in a joint bank account by her father, and also that she has a fondness for Emily Dickinson poetry. She spots some other girls her own age on the bus, but finds them vapid and annoying. Rynn does, however, make one new friend: Officer Ron Miglioriti, a local policeman and an Italian immigrant with a kindly and humorous disposition. He cautions Rynn to avoid Frank Hallet, who was caught in the bushes in an incident where he molested an underage girl but was never formally convicted of the crime.

Rynn has an altercation with snobbish landlady Cora Hallet, a woman who insists on showing up uninvited and claims to be looking for jelly jars that she keeps stored in the cellar. Mrs. Hallet questions Rynn about her father, demands to know why the girl isn't in school, makes rude ethnic slurs about a local Italian-American family, and hints at the possibility that Rynn is Jewish, making an antisemitic comment about "sweet wine". After Rynn becomes frustrated and mocks Mrs. Hallet for having a sex pervert as a son, the woman slaps the girl harshly across the face, pushes past her and attempts to enter the cellar. Something inside frightens her, causing her to scream, but the cellar door hits her on the head, knocking her unconscious. Rynn attempts to hide the expensive vehicle that Mrs. Hallet left parked in her driveway, but Mario, a local high school student, spots her and becomes curious. Mario reveals that he's a "cripple" (walks with a limp due to not getting his polio vaccine), which often keeps him out of normal high school activities such as sports, and also that he's an amateur magician, earning extra money by doing magic shows for wealthier children in town. Rynn initially distrusts him, but after Mario surprisingly aids her in hiding Mrs. Hallet's car, she lets her guard down and invites the boy for dinner. While the dinner is very formal and proper aesthetically, the children eat with their hands and drink alcohol, and Rynn's father never shows up. As the children get drunk, play and chase one another, Mario finds Mrs. Hallet's umbrella stuffed among the couch cushions, which, to Rynn's shock again, he plays with jokingly for a bit but then hides before anybody can find the item. Officer Miglioriti makes a surprise visit, and Mario reveals that the man is his uncle. The trio laugh and chat, but after Officer Miglioriti is gone, Frank Hallet shows up and harasses the children. He tortures Rynn's pet rat, Gordon, by burning into the animal's eye socket with his cigarette and the tossing its body into the fireplace. He also mocks Mario for being disabled. Mario snaps and attacks Hallet with a concealed knife after Hallet calls him a derogatory term ("wop"), threatening to kill Hallet and calling him a pervert. After Hallet flees, Rynn finally reveals her secret to Mario: her father died by suicide after being diagnosed with a terminal illness, leaving her enough money in cheques to rent her house for 3 years, until she can get a job and support herself. She keeps up the illusion that she is homeschooled and that her father exists but is "working' or "travelling". Rynn's abusive mother had at one point located her, but Rynn poisoned her with potassium cyanide and then preserved her corpse in the cellar (this is what frightened Mrs. Hallet). Mrs. Hallet met the same fate. Mario fears that Rynn might poison him as well, but she doesn't.

As the days go by, Rynn and Mario form a romantic relationship, burying the corpses of Mrs. Hallet and Rynn's mother in the garden, hiding the muddy shovel, and keeping a low profile. Mario gets severely cold after digging in the November rain, so Rynn looks after him and tries to keep him warm, while also evading an obnoxious telephone call from Frank Hallet. Rynn and Mario have their first sexual encounter that night, which turns out awkwardly, but still affectionate. Officer Miglioriti begins to wonder where Rynn's father is, but he is fooled when Mario dresses up as an elderly gentleman with a rough voice, "autographing" a poetry book for the policeman and lifting his concerns. Unfortunately, Rynn's world begins to collapse when Mario falls ill with pneumonia and ends up in the hospital. She sobs and hugs Officer Miglioriti when he reveals that he is being transferred for work. He warns her to be careful around Frank Hallet. She visits Mario in the hospital and kisses him, crying when she learns that he might die. After wandering aimlessly through town, she returns home, but that night, she sees the shadow of a top hat and cape emerging from the cellar, believing it is Mario, fully recovered and playing a trick. She is disgusted when she discovers that it's Frank Hallet, who reveals that he knows about her murders and will tell somebody unless she allows him to rape her and make repeated sexual visits. The prospect horrifies Rynn, but she pretends to accept the offer, brewing tea and allowing the man to stroke her hair. The book ends on the implication, as Frank has a coughing fit, that Rynn has poisoned him with the cyanide as well and will bury him with the other corpses to conceal her life from anybody else.

== Adaptions ==
Koenig adapted his novel into a 1976 film of the same name, directed by Nicolas Gessner and starring Jodie Foster as Rynn with supporting roles from Martin Sheen, Alexis Smith, Mort Shuman, and Scott Jacoby. In 1997, he adapted it into a stage play.

== Reception ==
In 1974, the science fiction magazine Luna Monthly reviewed it as "A light, gripping, smoothly written thriller." The review also assessed the character of Rynn Jacobs as not precisely a villain, but "brilliant" and "warmhearted." However, The Critic journal concluded "This doesn't work", saying Rynn was so clever and effective she did not come across as a teenager, comparing her to "an IBM computer".

In 2015, Rynn was voted the 20th most evil child in literature by Abebooks experts and readers.
