= Laird Koenig =

American author and screenwriter (1927–2023)

- Born: September 24, 1927; Seattle, Washington, U.S.
- Died: June 30, 2023 (aged 95); Santa Barbara, California, U.S.
- Occupation: Novelist; Scriptwriter
- Notable work: The Little Girl Who Lives Down the Lane

Laird Philip Koenig (September 24, 1927 – June 30, 2023) was an American author and screenwriter. His best-known work was The Little Girl Who Lives Down the Lane, a novel published in 1974. The novel was adapted into the 1976 film of the same name starring Jodie Foster. He also wrote a play based on his novel.

Koenig died of natural causes in Santa Barbara, California, on June 30, 2023, at the age of 95.

== Novels ==
- The Children are Watching (w. Peter L. Dixon) (Ballantine, 1970) (filmed as Attention, The Kids Are Watching, 1978)
- The Little Girl Who Lives Down the Lane (Coward-McCann & Geoghegan, Inc., 1974) (filmed 1976)
- Islands (Dell, 1980)
- The Neighbor (Avon, 1978) (filmed as Killing 'em Softly, 1982)
- The Disciple (Bantam, 1983)
- Rockabye (St. Martin's Press, 1981) (filmed 1986)
- The Sea Wife (Warner Books, 1986)
- Rising Sun (1986)
- Morning Sun : The Story of Madam Butterfly's Boy (Prospecta Press, 2012)

== Plays ==
- The Dozens. Dramatist's Play Service, New York 1969
- The Little Girl Who Lives Down the Lane. Dramatist's Play Service, New York 1997, ISBN 0-8222-1571-3

== Screenplays ==
- The Cat (w. William Redlin), 1966
- Flipper (TV series), episodes, 1966–1967
- The High Chaparral (TV series), episodes, 1970
- Red Sun [w. Dene Bart Petitclerc, William Roberts, Lawrence Roman], 1971
- The Little Girl Who Lives Down the Lane, 1976 (from own novel)
- Bloodline, 1979 (from Sidney Sheldon novel)
- Inchon (w. Robin Moore), 1981 (from story by Moore and Paul Savage)
- Rockabye, 1986 (from own novel)
- Stillwatch (w. David E. Peckinpah), 1987 (from Mary Higgins Clark novel)
- The Fulfilment of Mary Gray, 1989 (from LaVyrle Spencer novel)
- Tennessee Nights, 1989 (from Hans Werner Kettenbach novel)
- Lady Against the Odds [w. Bruce Murkoff], 1992 [from Rex Stout novel, The Hand in the Glove]

=== Awards and nominations ===
Award	Category	Nominated work	Result	References
5th Saturn Awards	Saturn Award for Best Writing	The Little Girl Who Lives Down the Lane	Nominated	
3rd Golden Raspberry Awards	Razzie Award for Worst Screenplay	Inchon	Won	

== Adaptations ==
- (Unknown) for "Intrigues" (French TV series), 1985 (probably The Little Girl Who Lives Down the Lane)
