= The Little Girl Who Lives Down the Lane =

1976 film by Nicolas Gessner

- Promotional poster for U.S. release
- Directed by: Nicolas Gessner
- Written by: Laird Koenig
- Based on: The Little Girl Who Lives Down the Lane; 1974 novel by Laird Koenig
- Produced by: Zev Braun
- Starring: Jodie Foster; Martin Sheen; Alexis Smith; Mort Shuman; Scott Jacoby
- Cinematography: René Verzier
- Edited by: Yves Langlois
- Music by: Christian Gaubert
- Production companies: Claremont Productions; Zev Braun Productions; I.C.L. Industries; La Societe Filmel; Ypsilon Films
- Distributed by: Astral Films (Canada); Cinema International Corporation (France); American International Pictures (US)
- Release date: May 1976
- Running time: 91 minutes
- Countries: Canada; France
- Language: English

The Little Girl Who Lives Down the Lane is a 1976 hybrid genre film directed by Nicolas Gessner and starring Jodie Foster, Martin Sheen, Alexis Smith, Mort Shuman, and Scott Jacoby. It was a co-production of Canada and France and written by Laird Koenig, based on his 1974 novel of the same title. The film follows 13-year-old Rynn Jacobs (Foster), a child whose absent poet father and secretive behaviours prod the suspicions of her conservative small-town neighbours.

The adaptation, originally intended as a play, was filmed in Quebec on a small budget. The production later became the subject of controversy over reports that Foster had conflicts with producers over the filming and inclusion of a nude scene, but a 21-year-old body double (Foster's sister) was used. After a screening at the 1976 Cannes Film Festival, a court challenge was launched regarding distribution, and a general release followed in 1977.

Initially released to mixed reviews, with some critics finding the murder mystery plot weak but Jodie Foster's performance more meritorious, the film won two Saturn Awards, including Best Horror Film and Best Actress for Foster. It subsequently attained cult status, with later critics positively reviewing the screenplay. Writers and academics have interpreted it as a statement on children's rights and variously placed it in the thriller, horror, mystery or other genres.

== Plot ==
On Halloween night, in a seaside town, Rynn Jacobs celebrates her thirteenth birthday alone. She and her father, Lester Jacobs, a poet, have recently moved to the village from Britain. Frank Hallet, adult son of their landlady Cora Hallet, visits unexpectedly and, finding her alone, makes sexual advances toward Rynn.

The following day, Cora Hallet comes to the house, first obtrusively poking around the garden, then coming inside and aggressively probing Rynn with pointed questions about herself and her father. Rynn says he is in New York with his publisher and taunts the landlady about her son's intentions. The situation becomes tenser when Mrs. Hallet insists on retrieving jelly glasses she left in the cellar. Rynn makes it obvious she is unwilling to let her landlady go down into the cellar, and Mrs. Hallet finally leaves. She returns later and opens the cellar trapdoor over Rynn's objections. Upset by what she sees there, Mrs. Hallet attempts to flee, but in her haste she knocks down the support. The cellar door falls on her head, killing her.

Attempting to remove evidence of Mrs. Hallet's visit, Rynn goes outside to drive her car away but cannot start it. This attracts the attention of Mario, a teenager passing by. Mario is the nephew of Officer Miglioriti, a village policeman who previously had given Rynn a ride home from town. Mario drives the car back to town, and Rynn rewards him with a dinner she prepares at her house.

Later, Officer Miglioriti stops by and tells them Frank Hallet has reported his mother missing. The officer asks to see Rynn's father, but Mario covers for Rynn by saying her father has gone to bed. Later that night, Frank Hallet makes a surprise visit. Suspicious, and looking for answers about the whereabouts of his mother and Rynn's father, Frank tries to scare Rynn into talking, cruelly killing her pet hamster. Mario chases Frank away.

Rynn now trusts Mario and confesses her actual situation. Rynn's terminally ill father and abusive mother divorced long ago. To protect Rynn from being returned to her mother's custody after his death, her father moved them to America and made arrangements to allow Rynn to live alone, then committed suicide in the ocean when the tides would carry his body out to sea. Her father also left Rynn a jar of potassium cyanide, telling her that it was a sedative to calm her mother if she ever came for her. Rynn coolly recounts how she put the powder in her mother's tea and watched her die.

Trust between Rynn and Mario blossoms into romance. On a cold, rainy day, they bury the bodies behind Rynn's house, but Mario catches cold. Suspicious of Rynn's continued evasions regarding her father's absence, Officer Miglioriti returns to the house one night and demands to see her father. Mario disguises himself as an old man and introduces himself to Miglioriti as Rynn's father. After Miglioriti leaves, Rynn and Mario go upstairs, where they undress and get in bed together.

As winter sets in, Mario is hospitalized after his cold causes pneumonia. Rynn visits an unconscious Mario in the hospital making her feel lonely. That night, as Rynn is going to bed, she is shocked to find Frank emerging from the cellar. Frank thinks he knows what happened to Rynn's parents and his mother, and attempts to blackmail Rynn. He offers to keep his silence and protect Rynn's secrets in exchange for her sexual favours. Rynn, seemingly resigned to Frank's demands, agrees to have tea with him. Frank tells her from the living room, how impressive she was, culminating in "You know how to survive". Rynn answers to herself "I thought I did" and puts cyanide in her own cup. But when she takes the tea and almond cookies into the living room, Frank is suspicious and switches his cup with hers. Rynn watches intently as Frank succumbs to the poison.

== Cast ==
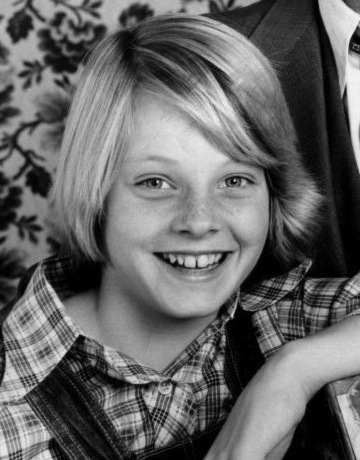
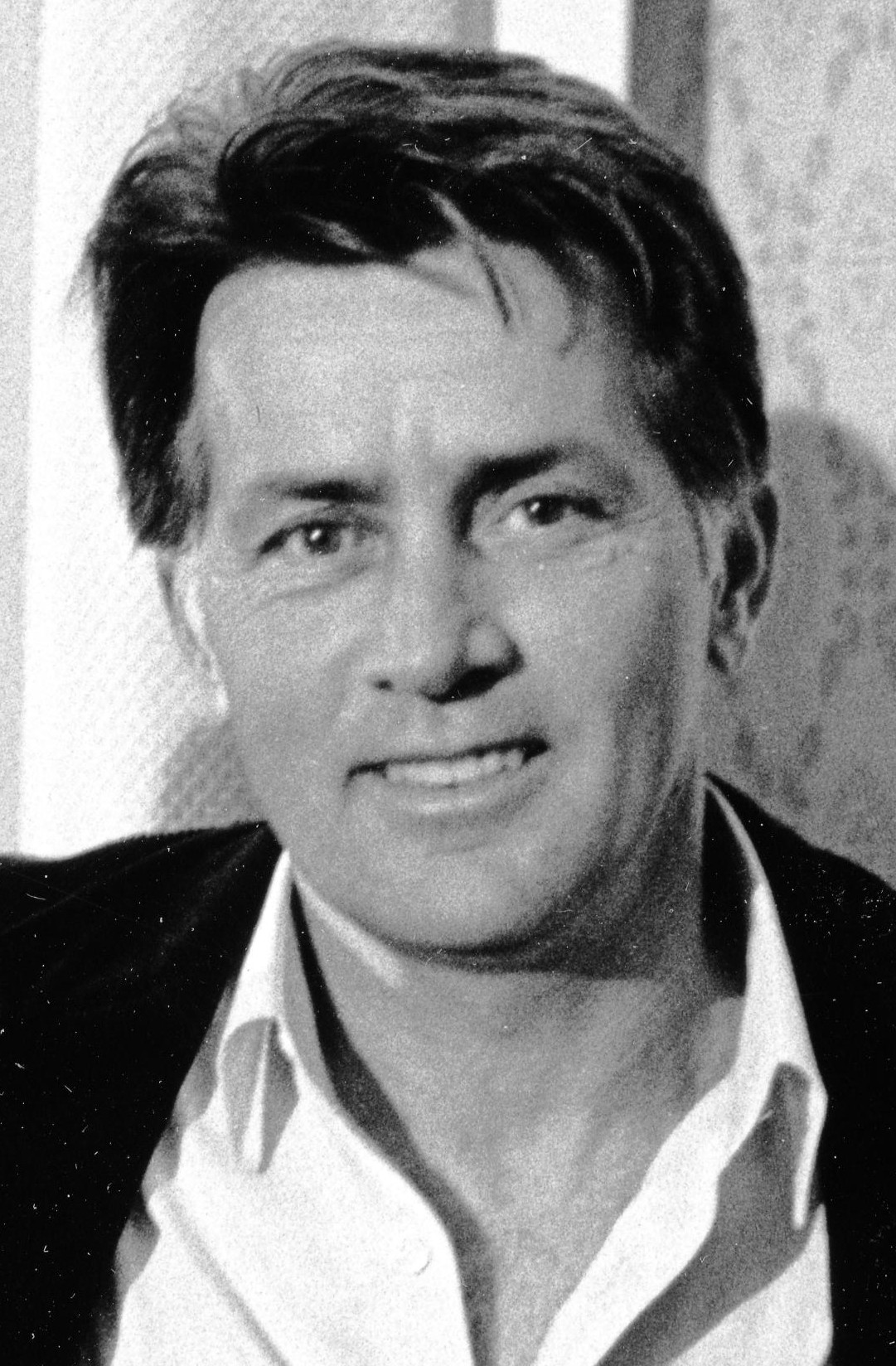
The cast includes Jodie Foster and Martin Sheen
- Jodie Foster as Rynn Jacobs, a girl who lives on her own.
  - Connie Foster, Jodie's 21-year-old sister, serves as Jodie's uncredited body double in a brief nude scene.
- Martin Sheen as Frank Hallet, grown son of Rynn's landlady.
- Alexis Smith as Mrs. Cora Hallet, the mother of Frank Hallet and Rynn's landlady.
- Mort Shuman as Officer Ron Miglioriti, a police officer who often visits Rynn.
- Scott Jacoby as Mario Podesta, the nephew of Officer Miglioriti, who befriends Rynn.

== Themes ==
Felicia Feaster, writing for Turner Classic Movies, found an "unusual theme" in the film, which she interpreted as being one of independence for children. Professor James R. Kincaid read the film as a call for children's rights. T.S. Kord wrote the film argued that a child with money and a home does not need a parent if he or she does not believe it is necessary. The adults who attempt to intrude in Rynn's affairs are a threat, including her mother, her landlord, and the molester.

Writer Anthony Synnott placed The Little Girl Who Lives Down the Lane in a trend of sexualizing children in film, calling Rynn the "murdering nymphet" and comparing her to Foster's character Iris in Taxi Driver (1976). Anthony Cortese also referred to Foster as giving an "encore performance" of Taxi Driver, calling Rynn "a 13-year-old imp of maturing sexuality". Scholar Andrew Scahill described it as fitting a cinematic narrative of children in rebellion, one in which the child appears seemly, as with The Innocents (1961), The Omen (1976), and others.

The genre has been debated, with Feaster arguing it was more psychological thriller than horror. Jim Cullen summed the film up as "a strange hybrid" of genres, being a horror, thriller, and feminist film. Kord listed it among dramas about "Eerie, malevolent or criminal children", distinct from depictions of children in the supernatural horror genre. Martin Sheen said it was a horror film in some ways, but "not overt", with mystery and suspense elements. However, director Nicolas Gessner denied it was horror, characterizing it as "a teenage love story".

== Production ==
=== Development ===
Novelist Laird Koenig adapted his book for the screen. Originally, the script was intended as a play, but this idea was abandoned due to the belief that a young actress would not be available to play Rynn for an extended period. Gessner read the book, only to find rights were optioned to Sam Spiegel, but the project was derailed due to creative differences, allowing Gessner to secure them.

The film followed tax incentives for cinema offered by the government of Canada, beginning in 1974, stimulating a "Hollywood North". It was a co-production of Canada and France, with Zev Braun producing as head of Zev Braun Productions, based in Los Angeles, alongside L.C.L. Industries in Montreal and Filmedis-Filmel in Paris. Canadian producer Denis Héroux, who during the decade specialized in popular cinema with financiers from outside the country, also worked on the project. It was shot on a small budget. Financiers disliked how in the novel, Rynn murdered Mrs. Hallet with poisonous gas, causing the scene to be rewritten so the death is accidental.

=== Casting ===
Director Martin Scorsese was editing Alice Doesn't Live Here Anymore, and Gessner's look at his work led him to discover Jodie Foster. With the guidance of her mother Brandy, Jodie took the role of Rynn, and turned 13 while the film was being shot.

Sheen said he was contacted by Gessner personally about playing Frank Hallet, which Sheen accepted because he found the part intriguing and because he believed Foster had a promising career. Gessner claimed Sheen was initially more interested in playing Mario, but Gessner persuaded Sheen that he was too old for that part. Gessner noted that casting Alexis Smith, who was born in Canada, also helped secure Canadian tax incentives.

=== Filming ===
The Little Girl Who Lives Down the Lane was filmed in Montreal, Knowlton, Quebec and Maine (specifically, Ogunquit, Maine). Sheen described the set as relaxed and as encouraging creativity, and said Foster also built a friendship with his daughter Renée Estevez during shooting.

A producer's desire for "sex and violence" led to a nude scene depicting Rynn being added to the film. Foster strongly objected, later recalling, "I walked off the set". As a result, her older sister Connie acted as the nude double. Her mother had suggested Connie, who was 21 at the time. Following the release of Taxi Driver, the industry shared stories of Foster having conflicts during the production of The Little Girl Who Lives Down the Lane. However, Gessner claimed Foster only regretted the scene after it was shot, and her request that it be deleted was denied by the Canadian producers.

The crew built a false trapdoor for Mrs. Hallet's death scene, but Gessner acknowledged Smith was nervous about the effect. For the scene where Frank Hallet kills the hamster Gordon, Sheen handled a dead and frozen rodent, and attempted to make it seem like it was still alive. Sound effects of squealing were added. The dead hamster was obtained from a hospital which carried out animal research, and the live hamster portraying Gordon in other scenes was given to the costume designer after production.

=== Music ===
Mort Shuman, who played Officer Miglioriti, was a musician in real life, so the crew intended that Shuman would also write the film score. However, Shuman's arranger Christian Gaubert wrote the bulk of the music, giving him the credit of composer, while Shuman was listed as the music supervisor.

Gessner wanted to use the music of Polish composer and pianist Frédéric Chopin, finding his music a good match with the dialogue. He said Chopin's music was intended to symbolize hope and absolution, along with sadness.

== Release ==
After a screening at the Cannes Film Festival in May 1976, Astral Bellevue Pathé Limited sold distribution rights to The Little Girl Who Lives Down the Lane, allowing it to make $750,000 worldwide by June. The film was shown in Paris with a French dub on 26 January and in Toronto on 28 January 1977. According to Variety, Beachfront Properties secured a temporary restraining order which gave it ownership of the film per a contract from September 1976. This order forbade any new sales but did not change the American International Pictures release in April 1977. The film had trial screenings in Albuquerque and Peoria, Illinois, on 18 March 1977. It opened in Los Angeles on 11 May and in New York City on 10 August 1977, with a PG rating.

On its initial release, the film poster depicted The Little Girl Who Lives Down the Lane as a horror film, with an image of a building evoking the 1960 film Psycho and the subtitle "She was only a little girl. She lived in a great big house...all alone. Where is her mother? Where is her father? Where are all the people who went to visit her? What is her unspeakable secret? Everyone who knows is dead."

A VHS release of the film removed the nudity, but it was re-added to the DVD. StudioCanal published a DVD in Region 2 on 20 October 2008. Kino Lorber released the film on Blu-ray in Region A on 10 May 2016. Hulu and Amazon Prime also made the film available to their customers in November 2016.

== Reception ==
=== Overall critical reception ===
The film has a 93% approval rating on Rotten Tomatoes, based on 15 reviews. Metacritic, which uses a weighted average, assigned the film a score of 53 out of 100, based on nine critics, indicating "mixed or average" reviews. Foster's biographer Louis Chunovic referred to the film as "much maligned" in his 1995 biography of the star.

=== Contemporary American reviews ===
Janet Maslin for The New York Times wrote this was Foster's most natural portrayal of a child and that Sheen was frightening, and found the romance to be the greatest strength. In The Washington Post, Gary Arnold called the film engaging, but claimed the murder plot is "too glib, too immorally contrived, to be satisfying."

Kathleen Carroll gave the film a two-star rating out of four, and, in her review of it for the New York Daily News, stated that "Jodie Foster plays Rynn with her usual aplomb, but it seems a dreadful waste of her talent. What makes the movie even more reprehensible is that it shows her stripping off her blouse and casually getting into bed with a 17-year-old boy. As such, the movie appears to condone teenage sex, and, for that reason, parents should use great discretion in allowing young people to see it in spite of the mild PG rating."

Charles Champlin of the Los Angeles Times called it "the exact movie equivalent of one of those slim, swift novels that are read on rainy Sundays or late at night or on vacation, for their pleasurable unimportance." Variety's review stated that the story was unbelievable, and that the romance was one of the few positive aspects.

Time's Christopher Porterfield felt the film failed to address the most interesting mysteries, and that doing so, combined with Foster's acting, would have made the film memorable. Judith Crist's review in the New York Post judged it to be "a better-than-average thriller".

=== Contemporary Canadian reviews ===
Clyde Gilmour of The Toronto Star said that "Jodie Foster alone emerges from this wishy-washy production with her renown intact. She handles her complex role with the cool adult professionalism that is her trademark. But the character itself is thinly developed in the script and remains an enigma at the obligatory freeze-frame fadeout." Martin Malina of the Montreal Star wrote that "this odd little adolescent love story-cum-murder mystery depends very heavily for its effectiveness on the playing of its principal character, and Miss Foster doesn't disappoint."

Julie Maskoulis of The Gazette wrote that "without her unbelievable cool and calm self-sufficiency as the unusual adolescent of the story, the film would not be nearly as penetrating. It is hard to say how much of Foster's stunning performance can be credited to director Nicolas Gessner, who brilliantly manipulates a build-up of suspense by insinuation and suggestion using Laird Koenig's screenplay (based on his novel). He spares us visually gruesome details, thus making the impact of their retelling, within the film much more forceful."

Frank Daley of the Ottawa Journal called the film "very slight" but said it "might do business in the U.S. on the strength of Foster's name." Noel Taylor of the Ottawa Citizen called the film "a modest thriller with conventionally scarey [sic] moments", adding that "director Nicholas Gessner builds his tension gently and is decently wary of sensationalism."

=== Retrospective reviews ===
Felicia Feaster of Turner Classic Movies remarked that The Little Girl Who Lives Down the Lane became a cult film, noting Danny Peary profiled it in his Guide for the Film Fanatic. Peary also listed it in his book Cult Horror Movies.

In 1992, James Monaco gave the film three and a half stars, assessing it as disturbing and complimenting the performances and writing. In their DVD and Video Guide 2005, Mick Martin and Marsha Porter awarded it three and a half stars, commenting it was "remarkably subdued".

Author David Greven praised Foster for a performance "achingly" suggesting "adolescent anomie". In his 2015 Movie Guide, Leonard Maltin gave the film three stars, declaring it as a "Complex, unique mystery".

=== Accolades ===
Year	Award	Category	Nominee(s)	Result	Ref.
1978	Saturn Award	Best Horror Film		Won	
1978	Saturn Award	Best Actress	Jodie Foster	Won	
1978	Saturn Award	Best Director	Nicolas Gessner	Nominated	
1978	Saturn Award	Best Supporting Actress	Alexis Smith	Nominated	
1978	Saturn Award	Best Writing	Laird Koenig	Nominated	
2017	Saturn Award	Best DVD or Blu-ray Classic Film Release		Nominated	

== See also ==
- List of films set around Halloween
