= The Sentinel (Konvitz novel) =

1974 novel by Jeffrey Konvitz

- First edition cover
- Author: Jeffrey Konvitz
- Language: English
- Genre: Horror
- Publisher: Ballantine Books
- Publication date: 1974
- Publication place: United States
- Pages: 278
- ISBN: 978-0345304377

The Sentinel (1974) is a novel written by Jeffrey Konvitz.

== Plot ==
Alison Parker, a beautiful but troubled fashion model, moves into a gorgeous New York City brownstone house that is divided into apartments. The house is inhabited on the top floor by Father Francis Matthew Halloran, a reclusive blind Catholic priest who spends his time sitting at his open window.

Alison is romantically involved with Michael Farmer, a lawyer and former prosecutor. Alison's life is beset for a number of reasons. She had a horrible relationship with her recently deceased father and survived at least one suicide attempt. Michael is under suspicion in the death of his former wife. A determined New York City Police Department detective named Gatz is sure that Michael murdered her and soon comes to suspect Alison as well.

Alison suffers sleep loss and horrible nightmares involving her father and soon begins to suffer blinding headaches.

Looking for distraction, she tries to ingratiate herself with the building's other occupants - but finds that they are bizarrely eccentric and obnoxious. Alison complains about them to the building's real estate agent. The agent is confused, telling a shocked Alison that there are no neighbours - besides herself and Father Halloran, no one else lives there.

Looking for answers, Michael breaks into a records archive of the Roman Catholic Church. Researching the past of Father Halloran, Michael learns that the man has none. Rather, Halloran's life "began" the day that another man's life apparently ended, leading Michael to believe that the two men are one and the same. He also finds similar records for a woman, a nun named Sister Therese who is to reside in Alison's building. Michael soon concludes that Sister Therese is actually the woman that Alison is meant to become.

Rushing to her building, he confronts the blind priest, only to be killed. Returning to the building, her headaches having returned and her skin beginning to desiccate, Alison finds Michael seemingly unhurt. He reveals that he is actually dead and also damned for killing his wife. He also explains that the house is actually positioned over the gateway between our world and Hell and that there must be a gatekeeper to protect the world from the denizens of the Underworld. Until now, that gatekeeper, or Sentinel, had been Father Halloran, but Alison is now expected to succeed him. Her troubled past, especially her suicide attempt, make her the appropriate choice. The inhabitants of Hell are actually her fellow "neighbours" and they know that they have one chance to escape the Abyss - pressuring Alison to complete her suicide. At the last minute, Father Halloran appears and saves Alison, driving the "neighbours" back to hell.

The book ends with Alison becoming the new Sentinel, Sister Therese, who is blind like Father Halloran before her.

== Film adaptation ==
The book was adapted into a film, also titled The Sentinel and also written by Konvitz. Konvitz wrote a sequel novel titled The Guardian (1979) which, as yet, has received no film adaptation.
