= Diamonds Are Brittle =

1965 French romantic crime thriller film by Nicolas Gessner

- Directed by: Nicolas Gessner
- Written by: Nicolas Gessner; Charles Spaak
- Produced by: Hanns Eckelkamp
- Starring: Jean Seberg; Claude Rich
- Cinematography: Claude Lecomte
- Music by: Georges Garvarentz
- Release date: 1965
- Countries: France; Italy; West Germany
- Languages: German, French
- Box office: $7.3 million

Diamonds Are Brittle (French: Un milliard dans un billard) is a 1965 French romantic crime film directed by Nicolas Gessner.

== Cast ==
- Jean Seberg as Bettina Ralton
- Claude Rich as Bernard Noblet
- Elsa Martinelli as Juliette
- Pierre Vernier as Roger
- Jacques Morel as Amédée de St. Leu
- Jean-Paul Moulinot as Le bijoutier
- Jacques Balutin as Un agent
- Elisabeth Flickenschildt as Madame Ralton
- France Rumilly as La dame à la bague
- Daniel Ceccaldi as Le capitaine du bateau
- Claude Darget as L'inspecteur cantonal
- Henri Virlojeux as Picard
- Annette Poivre as Une femme de ménage
- Jacques Dynam as Le commissaire
- Pierre Mirat as Un brigadier
- Günther Ungeheuer as Prof. Schmoll
