= The Sentinel (1977 film) =

Film by Michael Winner

- Theatrical release poster by Bill Gold
- Directed by: Michael Winner
- Screenplay by: Michael Winner
- Based on: The Sentinel by Jeffrey Konvitz
- Produced by: Michael Winner; Jeffrey Konvitz
- Starring: Chris Sarandon; Cristina Raines; Martin Balsam; John Carradine; José Ferrer; Ava Gardner; Arthur Kennedy; Burgess Meredith; Sylvia Miles; Deborah Raffin; Eli Wallach; Christopher Walken
- Cinematography: Dick Kratina
- Edited by: Bernard Gribble; Terence Rawlings
- Music by: Gil Mellé
- Distributed by: Universal Pictures
- Release date: February 11, 1977
- Running time: 92 minutes
- Country: United States
- Language: English
- Budget: $3.5 million
- Box office: $4 million

The Sentinel is a 1977 American supernatural horror film directed by Michael Winner, and starring Chris Sarandon, Cristina Raines, Ava Gardner, Burgess Meredith, Sylvia Miles, and Eli Wallach. The plot focuses on a young woman who moves into an old brownstone that has been subdivided into apartments, and finds that the building is a gateway to Hell. It is based on the 1974 novel of the same name by Jeffrey Konvitz, who also co-wrote the screenplay with director Winner. It also features Christopher Walken, Jeff Goldblum, John Carradine, Jerry Orbach, and Beverly D'Angelo in supporting roles.

The film was released by Universal Pictures in 1977.

== Plot ==
In northern Italy, a small group of Catholic priests from various orders gathers. A cardinal leads them in a prayer derived from Book IV of Paradise Lost:

Gabriel, to thee thy course by lot hath given
Charge and strict watch that to this happy place
No evil thing approach or enter in.

An American monsignor in the gathering announces, "There is danger."

In New York City, Alison Parker is a successful fashion model. She has a past history of suicide attempts stemming from childhood trauma: her father was an indiscreet serial adulterer. She has been living happily with her boyfriend, attorney Michael Lerman, but she feels the need for her own space. This feeling is intensified by the death of her father; her mother confides she never left him because she "had nowhere else to go." As Alison tours apartments, she is unaware she is being stalked by the American monsignor.

Alison chooses an antique Brooklyn Heights brownstone. The top floor apartment is occupied by a blind, reclusive priest, Father Francis Halliran, who spends his time sitting at his open window.

Alison immediately suffers physical problems, including headaches and fainting spells, and has insomnia due to loud noises. She meets her odd neighbors, including the elderly Charles Chazen and oversexed lesbian couple Gerde Engstrom and Sandra; she is disgusted when Sandra masturbates in front of her. She attends a bizarre birthday party for Chazen's cat. The other neighbors are just as strange. When Alison complains to the rental agent, Miss Logan, she is told that Alison and Halliran are the only occupants; the rest of the building is being renovated. Michael instructs a detective friend, James Brenner, to investigate.

Brenner goes to Alison's building at night. Investigating the noises independently, Alison encounters her father's animated corpse. She stabs it and flees screaming into the street in her underwear, attracting a crowd. She is hospitalized for a nervous breakdown. Police detectives Gatz and Rizzo, who have a history with Michael and suspect him of having murdered his wife two years ago, investigate but find nothing. Brenner is later found dead in an abandoned car, with wounds corresponding to Alison's description of her attack on her father's corpse. Gatz learns that Alison's "neighbors" are all long-deceased murderers.

Alison, who now sees Latin texts in ordinary books, visits a Catholic church and confesses her abandonment of Christ and her adultery with Michael to Monsignor Franchino, the priest who has been stalking her.

Because the Catholic Diocese owns the brownstone, Michael visits the Diocesan office for answers but is stonewalled by Franchino. Michael and a safecracker break into the office at night and learn Halliran is the latest of a series of individuals who attempted suicide in laity, then became clergy with a new identity on the date of their predecessor's death. Alison is listed as the next in the series, slated to become "Sister Teresa" the next day, the date of Halliran's death. Michael fears for Alison's safety and explores the brownstone in her absence. He discovers a hidden inscription derived from Inferno Canto III, and confronts Father Halliran, who confirms that the building is the gateway to Hell. When Halliran trails off chanting in Latin, Michael attempts to strangle him but is killed by Franchino.

Returning to the brownstone, Alison is confronted by Chazen and the disfigured minions of Hell. Michael is one of them, damned for adultery and for hiring Brenner to murder his wife. They explain that Halliran is the Sentinel, who ensures that nothing escapes Hell; Alison has been chosen as the new Sentinel to save her soul. Chazen tries to convince Alison to join Michael in Hell instead. Franchino appears supporting the frail Halliran, and they push through the horde bearing a large cross which the damned try to seize. Alison takes the cross from them, and the defeated horde recedes from view.

The brownstone is demolished and replaced with a modern apartment building shortly thereafter. Miss Logan shows the building to a young couple. She explains that there are only two neighbors: a retired violinist and a reclusive nun. Alison, now blind and wearing a habit, sits looking out a window.

== Cast ==
- Chris Sarandon as Michael Lerman
- Cristina Raines as Alison Parker
- Martin Balsam as Professor Ruzinsky
- John Carradine as Father Francis Matthew Halliran
- José Ferrer as robed figure
- Ava Gardner as Miss Logan
- Arthur Kennedy as Monsignor Franchino
- Burgess Meredith as Charles Chazen
- Sylvia Miles as Gerde Engstrom
- Deborah Raffin as Jennifer
- Eli Wallach as Detective Gatz
- Christopher Walken as Detective Rizzo
- Jerry Orbach as film director
- Beverly D'Angelo as Sandra
- Hank Garrett as James Brenner
- Nana Visitor as girl at end (credited as Nana Tucker)
- Tom Berenger as man at end
- William Hickey as Perry
- Jeff Goldblum as Jack

== Production ==
=== Development ===
Universal Pictures purchased the film rights to the novel The Sentinel in 1974 and originally hired its author Jeffrey Konvitz to write the screenplay. It later replaced Konvitz with Richard Alan Simmons as screenwriter and hired Don Siegel as director. Although location scouting for this version of the film was done in New Orleans in 1975, it was abandoned in favor of a screenplay co-written by Konvitz and the new director Michael Winner, who was offered the project by Universal executive Ned Tanen after they met at a party in Los Angeles.

=== Casting ===
Winner cast Cristina Raines in the lead role of Alison Parker, having directed her previously in The Stone Killer (1973), though her scenes were ultimately cut from the finished version of that film. In the role of Michael Lerman, Alison's attorney boyfriend, Winner hired Martin Sheen, but Universal disagreed with this casting decision, as executives felt Sheen had "done too much television" and did not have a wide enough appeal to film audiences. As an alternative, Winner cast Chris Sarandon, whom he had been impressed by in his role in Dog Day Afternoon (1975) as well as several Broadway theatre productions. Sarandon later commented that he regretted accepting the role: "When I first read it, I thought it had a chance of being a first-rate picture. I liked the book a lot... but I had no fun making it... It was the only picture I've done that I felt was not a success on any level, personally or professionally."

A number of Golden Age Hollywood stars were cast in supporting roles, including Ava Gardner, Martin Balsam, John Carradine, José Ferrer, Arthur Kennedy, Eli Wallach, and Sylvia Miles. Christopher Walken was given a minor supporting role as Detective Rizzo, while the film marked Beverly D'Angelo's first feature screen appearance; Winner later stated that he felt Walken and D'Angelo should have portrayed the lead roles of Alison and Michael. Richard Dreyfuss also appears in an uncredited role toward the beginning of the film.

Winner chose to cast Gardner in the role of the realtor, Miss Logan, because he felt "every time I rent an apartment in New York, I get it from a realtor who looks just like Ava. She keeps saying she's a lousy actress, but she's very good." After working with Gardner on the film, Winner became a lifelong friend of hers.

=== Filming ===
Principal photography began in New York City on May 21, 1976 with a budget of $3.5 million. The external views of the house were taken from the block built at the west end of Remsen Street in Brooklyn and many of the film's locations are in Brooklyn Heights.

Winner was visually inspired by the depictions of the creatures of Hell as they appear in the works of Christopher Marlowe, Dante's Inferno, and the paintings of Hieronymus Bosch. Shortly after the film's release, Winner revealed that many of the deformed persons featured in the finale were actually people with physical disabilities and abnormalities, whom he cast from hospitals and sideshows.

After the film's completion, Winner screened the final cut for Universal Pictures executives, whom he stated "almost committed suicide by doing a two-foot fall from their padded leather chairs."

== Music ==
John Williams was originally hired to compose the film's score before being replaced with Gil Mellé.

== Release ==
=== Box office ===
The Sentinel was released theatrically by Universal Pictures on February 11, 1977, and was a mild box-office success. It grossed a total of $4 million in the United States, and was the 57th highest-grossing film of the year.

=== Critical response ===
==== Contemporaneous ====
By director Winner's account, The Sentinel received reviews that were "on the whole, very good." Kevin Thomas praised the film's performances and entertainment value, but noted that it lacked originality, writing: "Whether intended or not, The Sentinel seems above all a parody of every chiller dealing with the supernatural from Rosemary's Baby through The Exorcist to The Omen. Indeed, the material is so derivative and therefore essentially unconvincing that it's hard to imagine how else it could have been played." Critic Peter Travers described the film as "one of those all-star movies featuring actors who give the impression of being in-between jobs... The shocking thing to me about The Sentinel is why actors such as Ferrer, Gardner, Kennedy, Meredith, Carradine, and Martin Balsam lend their names to it."

Variety gave the film a negative review, writing "The Sentinel is a grubby, grotesque excursion into religioso psychodrama, notable for uniformly poor performances by a large cast of familiar names and direction that is hysterical and heavy-handed." The New York Times called the film "dull", criticizing the film for its long stretches, but commended Raines' performance. John Simon of the National Review described The Sentinel as "dreadful". Film scholar Robert Bookbinder wrote in his 1982 book The Films of the Seventies the final sequence in which the "armies of Hell" terrorize Alison "is undoubtedly one of the most terrifying interludes in seventies cinema."

==== Modern ====
As of December 2025, The Sentinel holds an approval rating of 48% on the review aggregator Rotten Tomatoes based on 23 reviews. Anthony Arrigo from Dread Central gave the film 3.5 out of 5 stars, writing, "The Sentinel might be devoid of any big, memorable showstopper moments but it maintains enough of a chilling atmosphere to keep fright fans engaged." Brett Gallman from Oh, the Horror! gave the film a positive review, stating that, although it was not the best of the "demonic horror" subgenre, it was just as entertaining. Gallman also commended the film's script, performances and effective imagery.

David Pirie in Time Out was quite negative in his review, claiming The Sentinel was "just a mass of frequently incomprehensible footage, acted so badly that even the most blatant shocks count for little". Pirie criticised the movie for being derivative of Rosemary's Baby, The Exorcist and The Omen: "The Sentinel seems little more than a pile of outtakes from recent supernatural successes." Robin Wood described The Sentinel as "the worst—most offensive and repressive—horror film of the 70s".

Ian Jane from DVD Talk awarded the film 3.5 out of 5 stars. In his conclusion, Jane wrote, "Michael Winner's The Sentinel is a gleefully perverse slice of seventies horror that makes no qualms about taking things in a few entirely unexpected directions while still sticking to some tried and true genre conventions. It's not a perfect film but it's definitely interesting and always entertaining." The film was ranked #46 on Bravo's The 100 Scariest Movie Moments in 2004.

TV Guide awarded the film 1/5 stars, calling it "a truly repulsive film". Jedd Beaudoin from PopMatters gave the film 1/10 stars, criticizing the film's lack of believability and incoherent plot.

=== Home media ===
The first home media release of this film was in 1985, under the MCA Home Video label. Universal Pictures Home Video released The Sentinel on DVD in 2004. In 2015, Scream Factory issued the film on Blu-ray with new bonus materials, including three audio commentaries.

== Sources ==
- Alleman, Richard (2005). New York: The Movie Lover's Guide: The Ultimate Insider Tour of Movie New York. New York: Broadway Books. ISBN 978-0-767-91634-9.
- Bookbinder, Richard (1993) [1982]. The Films of the Seventies. New York: Citadel Press. ISBN 978-0-806-50927-3.
- Muir, John Kenneth (2007). Horror Films of the 1970s. Jefferson, North Carolina: McFarland. ISBN 978-0-786-49156-8.
- Nowell, Richard (2010). Blood Money: A History of the First Teen Slasher Film Cycle. New York: Continuum. ISBN 978-1-441-14316-7.
- Pirie, David, ed. (2010). Time Out Film Guide 2011. London, England: Time Out. ISBN 978-1-846-70208-2.
- Simon, John (2005). John Simon on Film: Criticism 1982-2001. New York City, New York: Applause Books. ISBN 978-1-557-83507-9.
- Winner, Michael (2004). Michael Winner: Winner Takes All: A Life of Sorts. London, England: Robson Books. ISBN 978-1-909-39621-0.
- Wood, Robin (1986). Hollywood from Vietnam to Reagan. New York City, New York: Columbia University Press. ISBN 978-0-231-05777-6.
