= Cynthia Tingey =

Costume designer for theatre and film

Cynthia Tingey (1931–2005) was a costume designer for theatre and film. She designed thirteen of the London Palladium's pantomimes, and was costume designer on over twenty films from 1956 to 1980.

Tingey was married to farmer David Holt. They lived in Devon, at Waterbrooks Farm, North Molton.

== Career ==
Cynthia Tingey trained in theatre design at the Regent Street Polytechnic, and started working in theatre in 1952. Her career included five years working as in-house designer for Bermans costume house, a business that supplied film, theatre and the growing market of television. At Bermans, Tingey trained younger designers including future Oscar-winner Yvonne Blake. Tingey was featured as a "fashion expert" in the BBC Television talent show It's Up to You (1957), which sought new variety acts in the north of England.

Tingey became best known as a designer for pantomime and variety theatre in London, and she produced the costumes for the Palladium's annual Christmas pantomimes for many years, dressing well-known stars of the time in spectacular and humorous costumes. Her designs often spoofed contemporary style, for example dressing Cinderella's Ugly Sisters in flower-power fashions and giving Mrs Crusoe horn-rimmed spectacles. In 1978, Tingey's "luscious" costumes for Aladdin included black helmeted Jedi knights in a reference to the year's hit film Star Wars.

From the late 1950s to the 1970s, Tingey designed costumes for cabaret and nightclub performers in London, including a large number of costumes for drag performer Danny La Rue. These were worn at venues including the Winston Club Cabaret, and from 1964 to 1972, at La Rue's own nightclub in Central London. In his memoir, La Rue credited Tingey with "an acute eye for detail, [she] devised some very clever outfits". Another of Tingey's long-running collaborations was with the popular singer and entertainer Cilla Black. Tingey designed Cilla's costumes for her West End debut in Way Out In Picadilly (1966) and for subsequent performances in panto and variety.

Tingey's film credits as costume designer include science fiction, comedy and horror films, as well as period dramas. Early titles included raft of low-budget British films dressed from Bermans, including Fire Maidens of Outer Space (1956), Behind The Mask (1958), and Tommy Steele vehicle Tommy the Toreador (1959).

In 1962, Cynthia Tingey worked with manufacturers David Gibson Fashion Group on the film Summer Holiday (released 1963); the designer selected clothes for the film's stars from the company's catalogues, and identical versions with Summer Holiday branding were then distributed to high streets nationwide and promoted in fashion shows. Cultural historian Matthew Kerry cites this "tie-up" collaboration between a designer and a retail group as a "then-unprecedented ... condensed consumerist push towards the youth market".

Later in her career, as a freelance costume designer, Tingey worked on British and American productions. For the 1968 Western movie Shalako, Tingey created a wardrobe of costumes for Brigitte Bardot that were later included in Megan Hess's list of 100 iconic moments in fashion, which acknowledged Bardot's "stylish clothes fit for the arid landscape".

Tingey's designs for Sinbad and the Eye of the Tiger (1977) were nominated for a Saturn Award for Best Costume Design.

In 1980, Tingey designed the costumes for The Martian Chronicles, a science fiction television series starring Rock Hudson and Bernadette Peters. In an interview to promote the show, Tingey explained that Hudson required "12 complete outfits for the Year 2020", which had to be designed and made over five days.

=== Design drawings ===
Tingey's design process involved stylised, precise drawings, usually on dark backgrounds to highlight the colours of the costumes. Yvonne Blake recalled that Cynthia "always painted with goache colours on Canson papers".

Nearly 200 of Tingey's designs for theatre and pantomime are held in the collection of the Victoria & Albert Museum, London, and a further group, relating to the Royalty Folies, are held in the University of Bristol Theatre Collection.

=== Pantomimes at the London Palladium ===
Working with Bermans Costume House, Cynthia Tingey costumed thirteen London Palladium pantomimes, managing ten consecutive years from 1964 to 1973.

- 1964: Aladdin and His Wonderful Lamp
- 1965: Babes in the Wood
- 1966: Cinderella
- 1967: Robinson Crusoe
- 1968: Jack and the Beanstalk
- 1969: Dick Whittington
- 1970: Aladdin
- 1971: Cinderella
- 1972: Babes in the Wood
- 1973: Jack and the Bean Stalk
- 1976: Cinderella
- 1978: Aladdin
- 1980: Dick Whittington and His Cat
