= Hans Werner Kettenbach =

German journalist and writer (1928–2018)

- Born: 20 April 1928; Bendorf, Rhine Province, Germany
- Died: 5 January 2018 (aged 89); Cologne, North Rhine-Westphalia, Germany
- Occupations: Journalist; Writer (crime fiction)
- Children: 2

Hans Werner Kettenbach (20 April 1928 – 5 January 2018) was a German journalist and writer.

He also wrote crime fiction under the pseudonym Christian Ohlig.

== Life ==
Born in Bendorf, across the river from Koblenz, Kettenbach grew up in Cologne. On passing his school final exams he began a study course covering Newspaper and Theatre studies, but his studies were cut short in 1953 by his father's death, after which he found himself taking over the running of his father's advertising agency. A succession of jobs, along with broken periods of further study followed.

Between 1954 and 1956, and again between 1958 and 1964, he worked as a Literary editor for radio and television plays with the Cologne-based broadcaster, Westdeutscher Rundfunk. From 1956 to 1958, he worked on a voluntary basis for the news editorial department of the mass-circulation Kölner Stadt-Anzeiger newspaper. In 1958, he embarked on a more sustained period of study, covering subjects that included Philosophy and East-European History. Eventually, in 1964 or 1965, he received a doctorate from Cologne University. His dissertation concerned Lenin's Theory of Imperialism.

== Published output ==
- Der lange Marsch der Bundesrepublik, Düsseldorf 1971
- Grand mit Vieren, Bergisch Gladbach 1978
- Der Pascha, Wien 1979
- Hinter dem Horizont, Wien 1981
- Glatteis, Bergisch Gladbach 1982
- Minnie oder Ein Fall von Geringfügigkeit, Zürich 1984
- Sterbetage, Zürich 1986
- Schmatz oder Die Sackgasse, Zürich 1987
- Der Feigenblattpflücker, Zürich 1992
- Davids Rache, Zürich 1994
- Die Schatzgräber, Zürich 1998
- Willy Millowitsch als Kommissar Klefisch, Köln 1999
- Die Konkurrentin, Zürich 2002
- Kleinstadtaffäre, Diogenes Verlag, Zürich 2004, ISBN 3-257-06385-7
- Zu Gast bei Dr. Buzzard, Zürich 2006
- Das starke Geschlecht, Diogenes Verlag, Zürich 2009, ISBN 978-3-257-06688-3
- Tante Joice und die Lust am Leben. Geschichten und anderes. Diogenes Verlag, Zürich 2010, ISBN 978-3-257-06740-8

In 1964, Kettenbach joined the editorial team on the Kölner Stadt-Anzeiger; between 1966 and 1968 he was a chief reporter for the newspaper, and from 1968 he was employed as correspondent and head of its Bonn office. In 1974/75, he served as chairman of the Bundespressekonferenz in Bonn. In 1978, he was sent abroad as his newspaper's New York correspondent. Following his return, between 1988 and his retirement in 1992, he was deputy managing editor of the Kölner Stadt-Anzeiger. As a journalist, he also contributed frequently to other newspapers, notably the Zürich based Tages-Anzeiger and the Frankfurter Allgemeine Zeitung, as well as regularly contributing reports on radio channels including DLF and WDR.

Hans Werner Kettenbach embarked on his career as a writer while still a working journalist, in the 1970s, producing psychological crime fiction. The manuscript for his first novel, Grand mit Vieren (1976) was reportedly written in just fourteen days. Subsequently, he has become one of Germany's top crime fiction writers. He has also written a succession of radio and television plays, notably for the television crime drama series Klefisch in which his fellow Rhinelander Willy Millowitsch starred as the eponymous police commissioner between 1990 and 1996.

Kettenbach was a member of the important German branch of PEN International. He died on 5 January 2018, at the age of 89.

== Awards and honours ==
Possibly the most prestigious of the literary awards he has received was the German crime fiction award, received in 1988 for Schmatz oder Die Sackgasse.
