= Nicolas Gessner =

Hungarian-born filmmaker (1931–2023)

- Born: 17 August 1931; Budapest, Hungary
- Died: 22 August 2023 (aged 92); Caen, France
- Occupations: Film director, screenwriter
- Known for: The Little Girl Who Lives Down the Lane

Nicolas Gessner (17 August 1931 – 22 August 2023) was a Swiss film director and screenwriter, born in Hungary. After early work in theatre and film, he began his international film career in 1965 and went on to direct around twenty productions for cinema and television. His films included Someone Behind the Door (1970) and The Little Girl Who Lives Down the Lane (1976), and he later worked in computer animation.

== Life and career ==
Nicolas Gessner was born on 17 August 1931 in Budapest to Martin Gessner, a lawyer, and Luise Benes, a special-needs educator, both from Hungary. His family settled in Zurich in 1939. Gessner studied Romance languages at the University of Zurich and completed a doctorate in the humanities, with a dissertation on Samuel Beckett. He lived in Zurich until 1976, when he moved to Paris.

While still at secondary school, Gessner volunteered at Condor Films. At the Schauspielhaus Zürich, Gessner worked as an assistant to Oskar Wälterlin and Leopold Lindtberg. He also assisted Jean-Louis Barrault in Paris and Henry Koster in Hollywood in 1957. Early in his career, Gessner worked with screenwriter Richard Schweizer, an experience he later described as useful preparation for his subsequent work. He worked as a director at the Stadttheater Luzern.

From 1958 to 1965, Gessner directed short films for Condor Films. Diamonds Are Brittle (1965), whose screenplay Gessner co-wrote with Charles Spaak, marked the beginning of his international film career. The film brought him considerable attention in Switzerland. With Someone Behind the Door (1970), his fourth feature film, Gessner departed from comedy for the first time. The psychological thriller starred Anthony Perkins and Charles Bronson.

Gessner's 1976 film The Little Girl Who Lives Down the Lane, a Canadian-French co-production, later acquired cult status. He selected Jodie Foster after seeing her in Alice Doesn’t Live Here Anymore. The international version included a nude scene performed by Foster’s older sister, Connie. Foster later recalled that, at age 12, she walked off the set when Gessner called for a nude scene. The film won Saturn Awards for Best Horror Film and for Foster as Best Actress.

Over the course of his career, Gessner made around twenty feature-length productions for cinema and television, many in a style influenced by American filmmaking. In 1996, he turned to computer animation with Spaceship Earth, a 52-part television production inspired by his interest in astronomy. He died in Caen on 22 August 2023.

== Selected filmography ==
A selection of Gessner's films as director includes:

- Diamonds Are Brittle (1965)
- The Blonde from Peking (1967)
- The Thirteen Chairs (1969)
- Someone Behind the Door (1970)
- The Little Girl Who Lives Down the Lane (1976)
- It Rained All Night the Day I Left (1980)
- Herr Herr (1982)
- The Sad Killer (1983)
- Quicker Than the Eye (1988)
- Tennessee Waltz (1989)
