= Jeffrey Konvitz =

American novelist

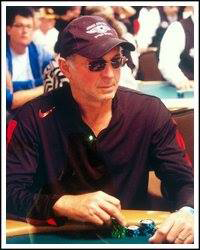
- Jeffrey Konvitz
- Born: July 22, 1944 (age 82); New York City, New York, U.S.
- Education: Cornell University; Columbia University School of Law
- Occupations: Writer, film producer, attorney
- Spouse: Jillian “Jill” McWhirter

Jeffrey Konvitz (born July 22, 1944) is an American attorney, writer, and film producer. He was raised in Woodmere, New York and graduated from Hewlett High School in 1962. He continued his education at Cornell University (BA 1966) and the Columbia University School of Law (1969). Konvitz is probably best known for writing the novel The Sentinel, published in 1974. It was followed by a film adaptation in 1977, which he produced and adapted from the novel.

He married model Vicki Peters in 1980, but they were divorced after parenting one child, Kristen Nicole (1983) who is a motion pictures packaging agent in Los Angeles. Later, he married actress Jillian McWhirter in 1998 and fathered a second child with her, Katherine Arielle (2002). He is Jewish.

Konvitz was Managing Partner of VX119, a financing company in the entertainment industry.

== Film career ==
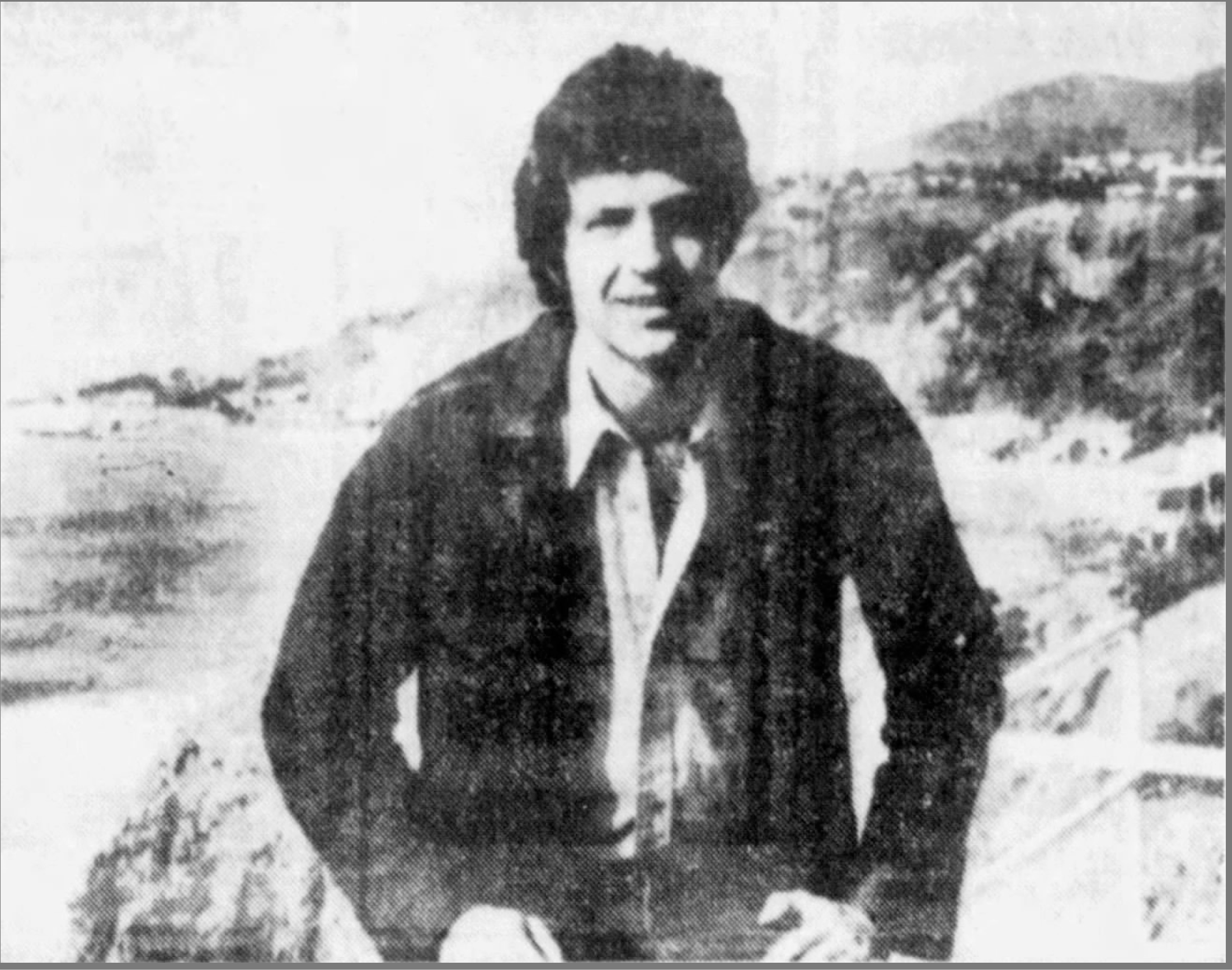
Jeffrey Konvitz 1974

Konvitz worked as an agent for CMA, general counsel for the Jerry Lewis theatre chain, a production executive for MGM, and as a film producer. As a producer, it would have been usual for Konvitz to option properties and put a package together. Konvitz saw that anything good was being snapped up by studios before it was ever seen by him, so Konvitz set out to create original projects. Konvitz wrote the screenplay for Silent Night, Bloody Night (1972), which he also produced. Konvitz showed the treatment to the financier on a Friday and told them the screenplay was being typed. The financiers asked to see the script but Konvitz didn't have a script or a writer, so he wrote the script himself in three days.

Konvitz first pitched The Sentinel as a movie, but was turned down by several studios, so he decided to write it as a novel, staying up writing until 4 am each night while he practiced law in New York during the day. Simon & Schuster bought the rights to The Sentinel in September 1973, and within six months he received an offer of $200,000 for the paperback rights and $500,000 for the movie rights from Universal. A first-time author had never before been hired by a major studio to adapt and produce a film from the author's own novel before. The novel would go on to sell over 7 million copies.

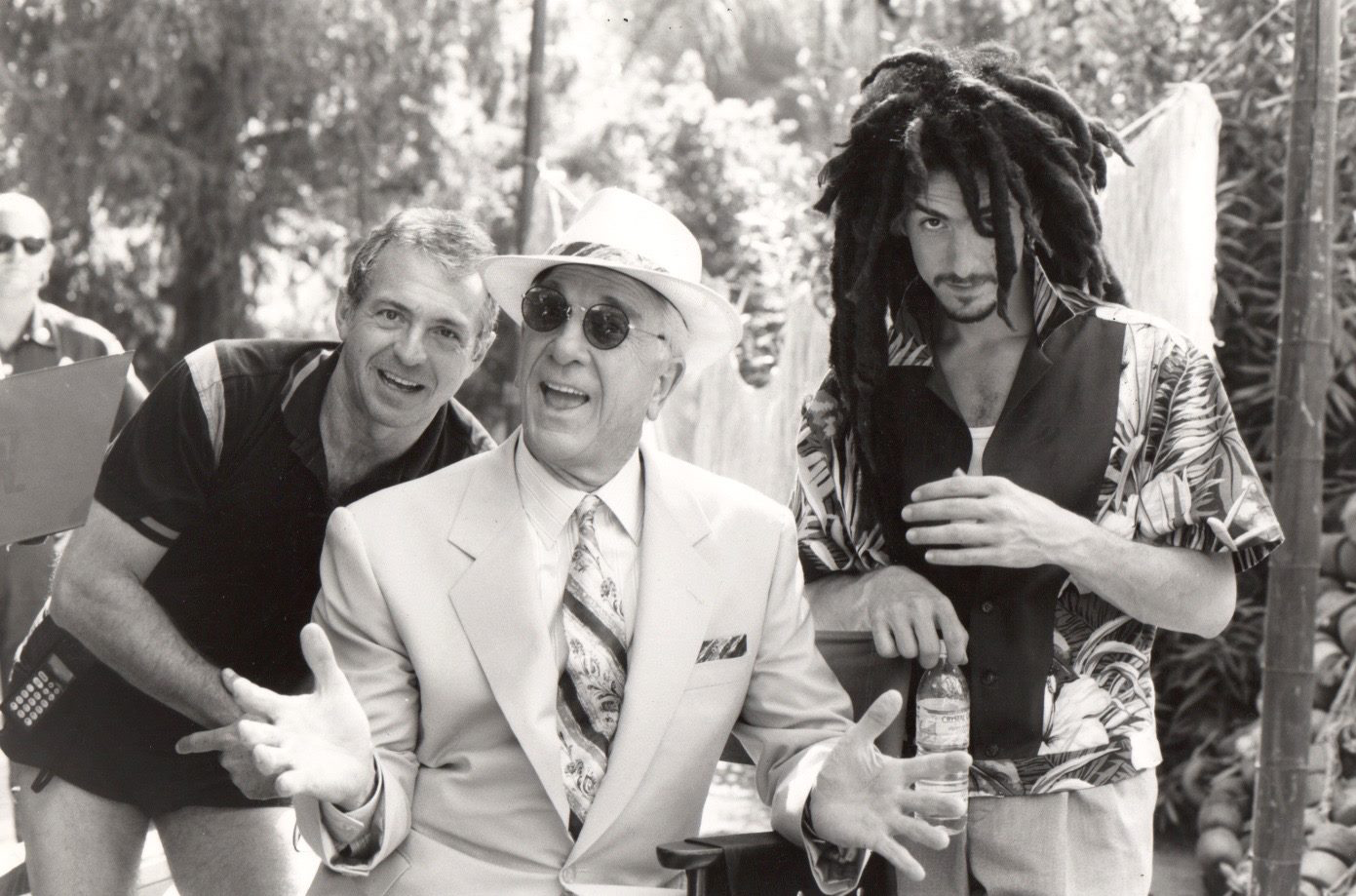
Konvitz & Nielsen - Spy Hard 1996

Konvitz's sequel to The Sentinel, The Guardian, sold out entirely in 10 days. Its publisher, Bantam, went back to immediately print a million extra copies. Konvitz dedicated The Guardian to "Rufus," who he credited with editing Chapter 27. Rufus was Konvitz's 170-Pound Great Pyrenees who ate the problematic chapter, forcing Konvitz to successfully rewrite it.

Konvitz rose to become one of the top independent production executives in Hollywood in the 1980s and 90's, leading two Nasdaq-listed Entertainment companies: Kings Road Entertainment, and Communications and Entertainment Corp./Odyssey Entertainment Konvitz was at the forefront of a new wave of film financing in the 1980s. This effective new model, structured financing including gap financing, quickly spread through Hollywood and abroad, and remains a popular strategy for independent film production even today.

== Works ==
=== Novels ===
- The Sentinel, 1974
- The Guardian, 1979 (the sequel to The Sentinel)
- The Apocalypse, 1979
- Monster: A Tale of Loch Ness, 1982

=== Screenplays ===
- Silent Night, Bloody Night, 1972
- The Sentinel, 1977
- Gorp, 1980

=== Producer ===
- Silent Night, Bloody Night, 1974
- The Sentinel, 1977
- Gorp, 1980
- Cyborg 2, 1993
- Bolt, 1994
- Bloodsport 2, 1996
- Spy Hard, 1996
- 2001: A Space Travesty, 2000
- O Jerusalem, 2006
- The Flock, 2007
- Spinning Man, 2018
- Under the Silver Lake, 2018
- City of Lies, 2018
- Berlin, I Love You, 2018

== Legal career ==
=== General ===
Konvitz was admitted to the State Bar of California on October 27, 1983. He is, and has been, an active member in good standing since 1983. His practice consists of entertainment finance law and business and entertainment litigation. He has also written major articles on tax shelter film financing for various legal publications

=== Major Litigation ===
In 1997, Konvitz was retained by Regent Entertainment as lead finance counsel and the lead litigation council in a dispute with Showtime over the financing of the motion picture Gods and Monsters. The dispute addressed whether or not Showtime could force Regent, under the terms of its domestic license agreement, to release the film directly to television as a Showtime premiere instead of the planned theatrical release. Konvitz and Regent prevailed and the picture was released theatrically. Gods and Monsters went on to garner dozens of awards including an Oscar, and became an LGBTQ+ film classic for its portrayal of openly gay film director James Whale.

On August 24, 1998, Konvitz as Plaintiff and co-counsel/pro-se, commenced a lawsuit in the United States District Court, California Central District in Los Angeles against Canadian investment bank, Midland Walwyn Capital, for fraud in a busted public merger. The jury found for Konvitz and judgement was entered against Midland and its successors-interest, Merrill Lynch Canada and Bank of America.

Commencing in 2002, Konvitz was retained as lead trial defense counsel representing The Ave Maria Foundation and Thomas Monaghan, the founder of Domino's Pizza, in a motion picture financing collapse wherein defendants Ave Maria and Monaghan were sued in the United States District Court, Central District in Los Angeles. The case was entitled Fulcrum Entertainment and Williams v. The Ave Maria Foundation et al. Defendants Ave Maria and Monaghan prevailed on all counts against it.

In 2009, Konvitz represented Regent Entertainment and Here Network, the preeminent LGBTQ+ streaming service, in a complicated German Tax shelter arbitration before IFTA.

In 2011, Konvitz filed a bank fraud lawsuit in Los Angeles Superior Court on behalf of Blue Rider Finance Inc., ("Blue Rider") a Konvitz-represented, transactional film finance company, against Harbor Bank and various individuals on allegations of bank fraud. Konvitz oversaw companion cases in Illinois and Maryland while securing a judgment against the defendants in this Los Angeles action.

In 2015 Konvitz filed a lawsuit in Los Angeles Superior Court on behalf of plaintiff Foreign Language Center Inc. et al. v. National Geographic, 20th Century Fox and David Hasselhoff et al. The case, which concerned a breach of contract and interference with contract for an ongoing film about the fall of the Berlin Wall, was settled in 2017 before trial.

Since at least 2017, Konvitz has represented Malek Media Group LLC (MMG) and Matthew Malek in a business dispute with AXQG Corp. and Anita Gou, among others. Malek is the principal of MMG, and Gou owns AXQG. The two companies had agreed to start a film production company, Foxtail Entertainment, LLC, but the relationship quickly soured. The parties arbitrated their dispute, AXQG won, and the Los Angeles Superior Court confirmed the arbitration award and entered judgement. The arbitration was a JAMS arbitration. Konvitz proceeded to file an appeal on behalf of his client. The appeal of the Superior Court's confirmation judgement of Arbitrator Huebner's final award was partially grounded on the improper exclusion of evidence. The primary challenge, however, arose under Code of Civil Procedure Section 1286.2(6), which requires a potential arbitrator to disclose "grounds for disqualification of which the arbitrator was then aware". The Court of Appeal affirmed the Superior Court judgement. The State Bar was supplied with all the Appellate Briefs, which were reviewed by State Bar trial counsel. No action was taken. The State Bar closed the file in June 2021.

On December 18, 2013, Blue Rider was sued by Geringer Capital Inc. ("GFI") in Los Angeles Superior Court with respect to a busted financing arrangement on the motion picture, Boot Camp. Blue Rider cross-complained. Konvitz successfully filed a summary judgement motion for Blue Rider against GFI in the trial court but Blue Rider's cross-complaint was dismissed. GFI appealed the summary judgement against it to the Court of Appeal, Second Appellate Division. Blue Rider cross-appealed the dismissal. Konvitz was not only trial counsel, but also appellate counsel. The Court of Appeal affirmed the judgement for Blue Rider and overturned the dismissal of the cross complaint. The case continued, but just before trial, the court disqualified Konvitz as trial counsel as he was also Blue Rider's key witness. The Court's decision was based on California's attorney/witness rule. Blue Rider appealed. Konvitz wrote the appellate briefs as appellate counsel. The Court of Appeal overturned the trial court in a landmark published decision and reinserted Konvitz as trial counsel, Appellate Opinion: B316718. Upon remand, the case was settled.

Konvitz is currently Plaintiff's trial counsel on the ongoing Los Angeles Superior Court film finance litigation, among other cases, entitled Trinity Media Financing International Ltd, a film finance company, v. Every Breath LLC et al.
