= The Guardian (disambiguation) =

The Guardian is a British daily newspaper founded in 1821, with sister publications in Australia and the United States.

The Guardian(s) may also refer to:

== Media and entertainment ==
=== Newspapers ===
==== Australia ====
- The Guardian (Swan Hill), a local newspaper, founded in 1888, serving Swan Hill, Victoria, and the surrounding areas.
- The Guardian (1844 Australian newspaper), a defunct weekly Australian newspaper.
- The Guardian: The Workers' Weekly, a bulletin of the Communist Party of Australia (1971).

==== Canada ====
- The Guardian (Charlottetown), a daily newspaper of Prince Edward Island, Canada

==== United Kingdom ====
- theguardian.com, the online resource of The Guardian
  - Guardian Australia, the online publication of the paper in Australia
  - Guardian US, the online publication of the paper in the United States
- The Guardian (1713), founded in 1713 and running only briefly
- The Guardian (Anglican newspaper), an Anglican newspaper published 1846–1951
- Cornish Guardian, a local weekly newspaper in Cornwall, England
- Farmers Guardian, a weekly newspaper aimed at the British farming industry
- Glasgow University Guardian, the student newspaper of the University of Glasgow
- Neath Guardian, a local weekly newspaper published 1925–2009 in Neath, Wales
- South Wales Guardian, a local newspaper in Ammanford, Wales

==== United States ====
- The American Guardian (published 1931–1942), a socialist newspaper in Oklahoma City, Oklahoma
- Boston Guardian (published 1901–1950), an African-American newspaper in Boston, Massachusetts
- National Guardian, a New York weekly newspaper founded in 1948 renamed The Guardian in 1967 and running until 1992
- San Francisco Bay Guardian, a free alternative newspaper published weekly in San Francisco, California
- UCSD Guardian, the student newspaper at the University of California, San Diego

==== Other countries ====
- Ashburton Guardian, a daily newspaper published in Ashburton, New Zealand
- The Guardian (Belize), the official print organ of the United Democratic Party
- The Guardian (Nigeria), an independent daily newspaper published in Lagos, Nigeria
- The Sunday Guardian, an Indian weekly newspaper based in New Delhi
- Trinidad and Tobago Guardian, a daily newspaper in Trinidad and Tobago
- Enniscorthy Guardian, a newspaper part of Mediahuis Ireland

=== Books and comics ===
- The Guardian, a 1979 novel by Jeffrey Konvitz, the sequel to his 1974 novel The Sentinel
- The Guardian, a 1995 novel by Bill Myers, the fifth volume in the Forbidden Doors series
- The Guardian, a 1997 novel by Joan Wolf
- The Guardian, a 1998 novel by Angus Wells
- The Guardian, a 1999 novel by Bethany Campbell
- The Guardian, a 2001 novel by Dee Henderson, the third volume in the O’Malley Series
- The Guardian, a 2002 novel by Anita Stansfield, the first volume in the Gables of Legacy series
- The Guardian (novel), a 2003 novel by Nicholas Sparks
- The Guardian, a 2008 novel by Linda Winstead Jones, the fifth volume in the Last Chance Heroes series
- The Guardian, a 2011 novel by Sherrilyn Kenyon, the 33th chronological installment in the Dark Hunter Universe series of novels and the 21st overall published
- The Guardian, a 2012 novel by Gerald N. Lund
- The Guardian, a 2013 novel by Linda McNabb, the first volume in the Realm of Shadows trilogy
- The Guardian, a 2013 novel by Beverly Lewis, the third volume in the Home to Hickory Hollow series
- "The Guardians", a 1955 short story by Irving Cox, Jr., first published in the June 1955 issue of Astounding Science Fiction
- The Guardians, a 1955 novel by J. I. M. Stewart
- The Guardians, a 1964 novel by John Farris, written as Steve Brackeen
- The Guardians (Christopher novel), a 1970 novel by John Christopher
- The Guardians (Abbey novel), a 1982 novel by Lynn Abbey
- The Guardians, a 1985–90 series of military science fiction novels by Richard Austin
- The Guardians, a 2007 novel by Ana Castillo
- The Guardians, a 2007 novel by Mandy M. Roth
- The Guardians, a 2011 novel by Andrew Pyper
- The Guardians: An Elegy, a 2012 non-fiction book by Sarah Manguso
- The Guardians, a 2012 omnibus of the first three Guardians of Childhood novels by William Joyce
- The Guardians, a 2015 novel by Paul Collins and Sean McMullen, the sixth volume in The Warlock's Child series

=== Card, computer, and video games ===
- The Guardian, an alien being in the Ultima series
- The Guardian, the main and player character of The Guardian Legend, a 1988 video game

=== Films ===
- The Guardian (1990 film), a horror film directed by William Friedkin
- The Guardian (2006 film), a drama starring Kevin Costner and Ashton Kutcher
- The Guardians (2017 film), a French film
- Guardians (2017 film), a Russian film
- The Guardian, also known as Ana (2020 film), a film starring Andy García
- The Guardian (2026 film), a Korean-Philippine action-drama film

=== Music ===
- The Guardian (album), a 2024 album by Chinese singer-songwriter Joker Xue

=== Television ===
==== Characters ====
- The Guardian, a character in the 1999 television series The Tribe
- The Guardians, a group of characters in the 1984 TV series Challenge of the GoBots

==== Episodes ====
- "The Guardian", American Housewife season 5, episode 11 (2021)
- "The Guardian", Beastmaster season 1, episode 14 (2000)
- "The Guardian", Dr. Christian season 1, episode 5 (1956)
- "The Guardian", JAG season 2, episode 12 (1997)
- "The Guardian", Lassie (1954 TV series) season 14, episode 4 (1967)
- "The Guardian", Lone Wolf and Cub season 3, episode 24 (1976)
- "The Guardian", Mowgli: The New Adventures of the Jungle Book episode 20 (1998)
- "The Guardian", NCIS: Los Angeles season 10, episode 23 (2019)
- "The Guardian", Nikitaseason 1, episode 5 (2010)
- "The Guardian" (Once Upon a Time), season 7, episode 18 (2018)
- "The Guardian", Please Don't Eat the Daisies season 2, episode 14 (1966)
- "The Guardian" (Sliders), season 3, episode 4 (1996)
- "The Guardian", Temple Houston episode 15 (1964)
- "The Guardian", The Girl in the Woods episode 1 (2021)
- "The Guardian", The Interns episode 21 (1971)
- "The Guardian", The Journey of Allen Strange season 1, episode 8 (1998)
- "The Guardian", The Legend of Prince Valiant season 1, episode 14 (1991)
- "The Guardian", The Lost World season 2, episode 13 (2001)
- "The Guardians", Buck Rogers in the 25th Century season 2, episode 5 (1981)
- "The Guardians", Samurai 7 episode 8 (2004)
- "The Guardians", Sea Princesses season 2, episode 22 (2014)
- "The Guardians", The Adventures of Sinbad season 2, episode 21 (1998)
- "The Guardians", The Magical Adventures of Quasimodo episode 25 (1996)
- "The Guardians", Walker, Texas Ranger season 3, episode 3 (1995)

==== Shows ====
- The Guardian (TV series), a 2001–2004 American drama television series starring Simon Baker that aired on CBS
- The Guardians (British TV series), a 1971 British television drama series
- The Guardians (South Korean TV series), a 2017 South Korea television series

=== Plays ===
- The Guardian (play), a 1633 Caroline era stage play by Philip Massinger

== Other uses ==
- The Guardian (sculpture), a 1995 public artwork by artist Ante Buljan in Redwood City, California, US
- The Guardian (album), a 2024 album by Chinese singer Joker Xue
- The Guardian, a 2.2-metre (7 ft 3 in) tall bronze sculpture at the Bull Ring, Birmingham, England
- Shoghi Effendi, head of the Baha'i Faith from 1921 until 1957, known by his title of 'The Guardian'
- "The Guardian", season 4, episode 8 of the American actual play web series Rivals of Waterdeep (2019)

== See also ==
- Guardian (disambiguation)
- Defender (disambiguation)
- Guard (disambiguation)
- Guardia (disambiguation)
- La Guardia (disambiguation)
- Guarda (disambiguation)
- The Guard (disambiguation)
