= Guardian =

Guardian usually refers to:

- Legal guardian, a person with the authority and duty to care for the interests of another
- The Guardian, a British daily newspaper

(The) Guardian(s) may also refer to:

== Places ==
- Guardian, West Virginia, US, an unincorporated community in Webster County
- Guardian Nunatak, a landform on Antarctica's Dufek Coast
- Guardian Rock, an islet off the Antarctic Peninsula in Bigourdan Fjord
- Guardian telephone exchange, Manchester, England
- Wonder Mountain's Guardian, a roller coaster at Canada's Wonderland, Vaughan, Ontario

== People ==
- GuardiaN (Ladislav Kovács; born 1991), Slovak professional video-game player
- Angel Guardian (born 1998), Filipina actress and singer
- Don Guardian (born 1953), mayor of Atlantic City, New Jersey, US

== Arts, entertainment, and media ==
=== Fictional entities ===
- Guardian (comics), characters from various comics
- Guardian (DC Comics), a superhero
- Guardian (Highlander), a character in the film Highlander: The Source (2007)
- Guardian, a supercomputer in American science fiction thriller film Colossus: The Forbin Project (1970)
- Guardians, player characters in Destiny, a 2014 first-person shooter video game
- Guardians, a playable class in the game The Lord of the Rings Online
- Philosopher kings, also called Guardians, a role hypothesised in Plato's Republic
- The Guardian, the main and player character of The Guardian Legend, a 1988 video game
- The Guardian, an alien being in the Ultima series of role-playing video games
- The Guardians, a group of characters in the 1984 TV series Challenge of the GoBots
- Guardians, police officers in The Handmaid's Tale (TV series)
- Guardians, enemies in The Legend of Zelda: Breath of the Wild

=== Films ===
- Guardian, 2001, directed by John Terlesky
- The Guardian (1917 film), a silent film starring Montagu Love and June Elvidge
- The Guardian (1990 film), a horror film directed by William Friedkin
- The Guardian, a 1997 television film starring Stephanie Niznik
- The Guardian (2006 film), a drama starring Kevin Costner and Ashton Kutcher
- Guardians (2012 film), a German action film
- Guardians (2017 film), a Russian superhero film
- The Guardians (2017 film), a French film directed by Xavier Beauvois
- Guardian (2021 film), a Malayalam-language film directed by Satheesh Paul
- Guardian (2024 film), a Tamil-language horror film directed by Sabari and Guru Saravanan
- The Guardian (2024 film), a South Korean-Philippine action drama directed by Jeong Jang-hwan

=== Games ===
- Guardian (1986 video game), a 1986 beat 'em up for arcades
- Guardians (card game), a collectible card game published in 1995/96
- Guardian (video game), a 1994 3D shoot 'em up for the Amiga CD32 games console
- Guardians (video game), a 1995 coin-operated arcade game

=== Literature ===
- Guardians (play), a 2005 off-Broadway stage play by Peter Morris
- The Guardian (novel), 2003, by Nicholas Sparks
- The Guardian (play), a 1633 Caroline era stage play by Philip Massinger, reworked 1642 by A. Cowley
- The Guardians (Christopher novel), 1970, by John Christopher
- The Guardians (Abbey novel), a 1982 novel by Lynn Abbe
- The Guardians (Grisham novel), a 2019 legal thriller novel by John Grisham
- The Guardians, a series of military science fiction novels published from 1985 to 1990 by Richard Austin
- The Guardians, a 2007 novel by Ana Castillo

=== Music ===
- Guardian (band), an American Christian hard rock/metal band
- Guardians (The Crimson Armada album), 2009
- Guardians (August Burns Red album), 2020
- "Guardian" (song), 2012, by Alanis Morissette from her album Havoc and Bright Lights
- "Guardian", a song by Fates Warning from their 1986 album Awaken the Guardian
- Guardians Drum and Bugle Corps, a drum and bugle corp from Dallas, Texas
- "GUARDIAN", a track from Deltarune Chapters 3+4 (Original Game Soundtrack)

=== News and periodicals ===
==== Australia ====
- Daily Guardian (Sydney), a former newspaper in Sydney
- The Guardian, a bulletin of the Communist Party of Australia (1971)
- One of various newspapers in New South Wales

==== Canada ====
- Brampton Guardian, a free, weekly community newspaper in Ontario
- Etobicoke Guardian, a weekly suburban newspaper in Toronto
- The Guardian (Charlottetown), a daily newspaper on Prince Edward Island

==== United Kingdom ====
- Guardian Media Group, owners of The Guardian, The Observer and The Guardian Weekly
  - The Guardian, formerly Manchester Guardian
  - theGuardian.com, online resource of The Guardian
- Cornish Guardian, a local weekly newspaper in Cornwall, England
- Farmers Guardian, a weekly newspaper aimed at the British farming industry
- Glasgow University Guardian, the student newspaper of the University of Glasgow
- Neath Guardian (published 1925–2009), a local weekly newspaper in Neath, Wales
- South Wales Guardian, a local newspaper in Ammanford, Wales
- The Guardian (1713), a London newspaper founded in 1713 and running only briefly
- The Guardian (Anglican newspaper), founded in 1846 and running until 1951
- Local and regional newspapers published by Newsquest

==== United States ====
- Boston Guardian (published 1901–1950), an African-American newspaper in Boston, Massachusetts
- National Guardian, a New York weekly newspaper founded in 1948, renamed The Guardian in 1967 and running until 1992
- San Francisco Bay Guardian, a free alternative newspaper published weekly in San Francisco, California
- UCSD Guardian, the student newspaper at the University of California, San Diego

==== Elsewhere ====
- Ashburton Guardian, a daily, later tri-weekly, newspaper in Ashburton, New Zealand
- The Guardian (Belize), the official print organ of the United Democratic Party
- Daily Guardian (Iloilo), an English-language newspaper in Iloilo City, Philippines
- The Guardian (Nigeria), an independent daily newspaper published in Lagos, Nigeria
- The Sunday Guardian, a weekly newspaper based in New Delhi, India
- Trinidad and Tobago Guardian, a daily newspaper in Trinidad and Tobago

=== Television and web series ===
==== Series ====
- Guardian (web series), a Chinese web drama released in 2018
- Guardians Evolution, a 2014 claymation series on APTN Kids
- The Guardian (TV series), an American CBS series that first aired in 2001 starring Simon Baker
- The Guardians (South Korean TV series), South Korea
- Guardian: The Lonely and Great God, South Korea
- The Guardians (British TV series), a 1971 British television drama series

==== Episodes ====
- "Guardians" (The Walking Dead), an episode of the television series The Walking Dead
- "The Guardian" (Sliders), an episode of the television series Sliders

=== Visual arts ===
- Guardian (sculpture), a statue in Abertillery, Wales, UK
- The Guardian (sculpture), a public artwork in Redwood City, California, US
- Guardians, artworks by American artist Kris Neely
- Guardians of Traffic, a set of statues on the Hope Memorial Bridge in Cleveland, Ohio, US
- Wächter (Anatol) (Guardian), several monumental outdoor sculpture by Anatol Herzfeld

== Businesses and organizations ==
=== Financial institutions ===
- Guardian Bank, Kenya
- Guardian Building Society, UK
- Guardian Capital Group, a publicly traded asset management company
- The Guardian Life Insurance Company of America, a mutual life insurance company domiciled in New York

=== Other businesses and organizations ===
- Guardian Angels, an international volunteer organization for unarmed crime prevention
- Guardian Industries, a manufacturer of glass, automotive and building products headquartered in Auburn Hills, Michigan
- Mannings, known as Guardian in Indonesia, Malaysia and Singapore, a health care retailer

== Military ==
=== Military vehicles ===
- Boeing AH-64E Apache Guardian, a variant of the AH-64 Apache
- Dassault HU-25 Guardian, a modified Falcon 20 business jet formerly used by the U.S. Coast Guard
- Grumman AF Guardian, a warplane of the U.S. Navy
- HMS Guardian, three ships of the Royal Navy
- USS Guardian, three ships of the U.S. Navy

=== Other military uses ===
- Northrop Grumman Guardian, an anti-missile system for commercial airliners
- Space professionals of the United States Space Force
- Weishi Rockets (Chinese: 卫士; lit. 'Guardian'), a family of Chinese multiple rocket launcher systems

== Religion ==
- Custos (Franciscans) or Guardian, the term used in place of Religious Superior among Franciscans
- Guardian (Baháʼí Faith), a now defunct hereditary office of the Bahá'í Faith
- Guardian angel, assigned to protect and guide a particular person or group
- Guardian deity, a spirit who protects a particular place, person, culture or occupation
- Medusa (meaning "Guardian" or "Protectress"), one of the Gorgons of Greek mythology

== Sports ==
=== Asia ===
- Fubon Guardians, a team in the Chinese Professional Baseball League (CPBL) in Taiwan
- Galle Guardians, a provincial T20 cricket team in Sri Lanka

=== United States ===
- Cleveland Guardians, a team in Major League Baseball (MLB) known as the Cleveland Indians from 1915 through 2021
- Dallas Beer Guardians, an independent supporters group of FC Dallas of Major League Soccer (MLS)
- Golden Guardians, an esports organization
- Orlando Guardians, an American-football team in the XFL, formerly the New York Guardians
- San Diego Guardians, a team in The Basketball League (TBL)

== Technology ==
- Guardian (database), an intel reporting system the FBI use to track threats
- Guardian (polymer), a substrate used in the production of polymer banknotes
- Galaxy (spacecraft), previously Guardian, a cancelled prototype space habitat

== Other uses ==
- Guardian (fireboat), operated in the San Francisco Bay since 1990 in reserve status
- Guardian of Scotland, the de facto head of state of Scotland during the interregnums of 1290–1292 and 1296–1306
- Guardian stones, standing stones at the corners of enclosures around a dolmen
- Guardian temperament, one of the four temperaments according to the Keirsey Temperament Sorter

== See also ==
- Defender (disambiguation)
- Guard (disambiguation)
- Guarda (disambiguation)
- Guardia (disambiguation)
- La Guardia (disambiguation)
- The Guard (disambiguation)
- The Guardian (disambiguation)
- 嘉德 (disambiguation)
