= Guardian II =

Guardian II or Guardians 2, may refer to:

- Guardians of the Galaxy Vol. 2 (film) a.k.a. "Guardians 2", a 2017 film set in the Marvel Cinematic Universe
- Guardians of the Galaxy Volume 2 (book) a.k.a. "Guardians, volume 2", a Marvel Comics compilation comic book; see Guardians of the Galaxy (2008 team)#Volume 2 (Abnett and Lanning)
- Guardian II: Revenge of the Mutants (videogame), a 1990 videogame; see List of Amstrad CPC games and List of ZX Spectrum games
- Guardian II (character), a DC Comics character; see List of Young Justice characters
- Guardian II (character), a Marvel Comics character; see Official Handbook of the Marvel Universe
- Operation Guardian II (military operation), a 2002 Royal Australian Air Force operation
- McCoy Miller Guardian II (vehicle), an ambulance type operated by the Lancaster Volunteer Ambulance Corps

== See also ==
- Guardian (disambiguation)
