= Zone of interaction =

Communication Concept

The Zone of interaction is the area of an audience in which speaker and audience members can make eye contact.

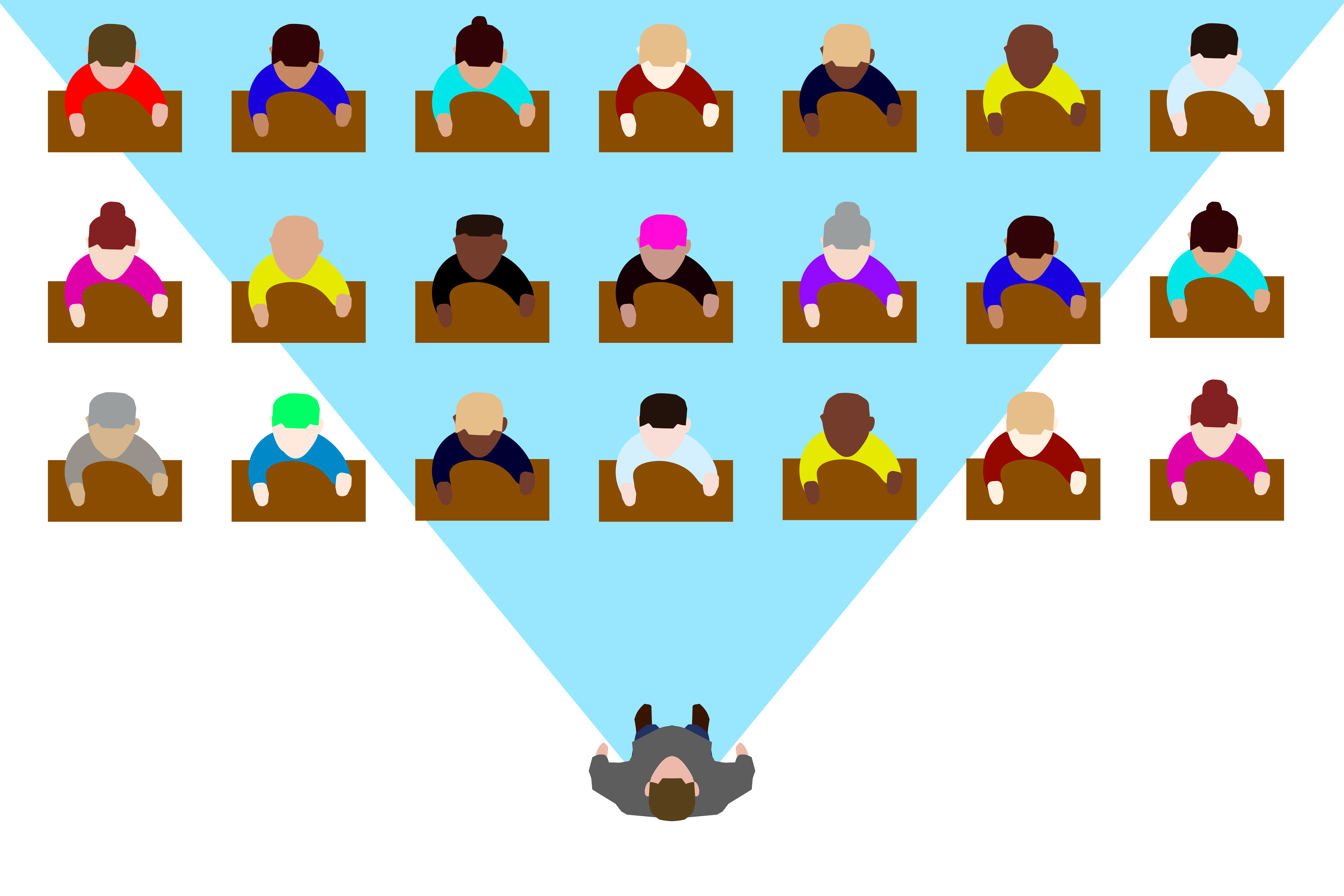
Speaking from a fixed position can limit the zone of interaction

In formal public speaking, eye contact is one of the most important ways a speaker can make connections with their audience. Research has shown that when speakers increased their eye contact with audience members, it significantly increased how credible that audience found them to be. In most formal public speaking situations the ability to make eye contact is dependent on the environment.

In most formal public speaking situations, the ability to make eye contact is dependent on the environment and the range of your peripheral vision. This "zone of interaction" becomes smaller as room size increases and makes it more difficult for a speaker to connect with their audience. There are two ways for a speaker to expand their zone of interaction. When speaking from a fixed position--like from behind a lectern--a speaker can scan the audience looking from side to side. This method can help the speaker make eye-contact with a larger portion of the room, however those audience members who are seated in the front rows to the far left and the far right will be cut off by the limits of your peripheral vision.

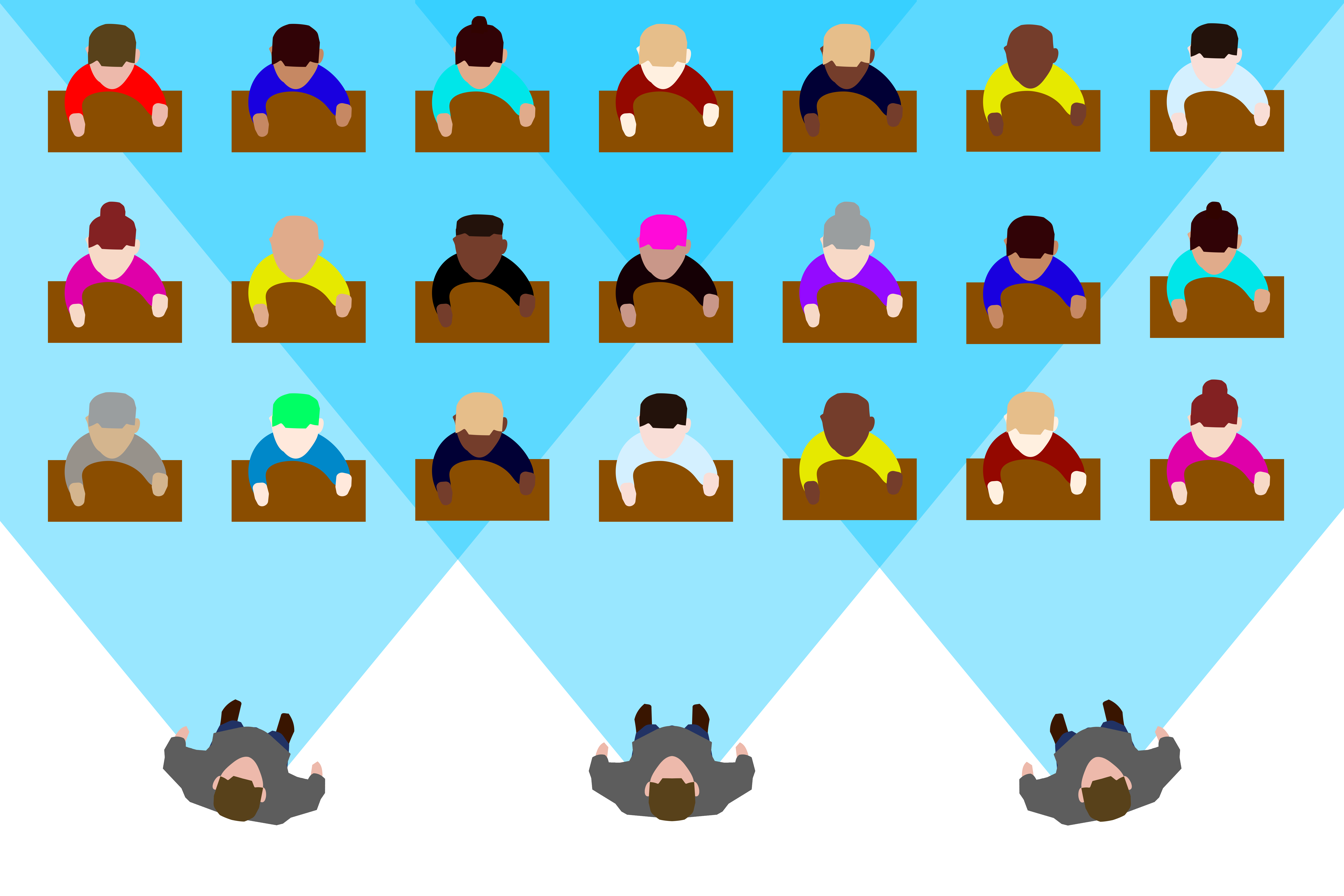
A speaker's stage movement can increase their zone of interaction

An alternative method of increasing the zone of interaction is to abandon a fixed position in favor of moving to different points during the speech. Moving to different stage positions allows the speaker to shift their zone of interaction to include audience members who were previously cut off by the limits of the speakers' peripheral vision. A common method used by speakers to manage this movement is the Speaker's triangle. When using this technique, a speaker moves to a different point on the stage as they transition between main points.
