= Defenders Day =

Defenders Day may refer to one of several public holidays:

- Defenders Day (Maryland)
- Defenders Day (Ukraine)
- Defender of the Fatherland Day (Kazakhstan)
- Defender of the Motherland Day (Uzbekistan)
- Defender of the Fatherland Day (Russia)

== See also ==
- Defender of the Faith (disambiguation)
