= Guardia =

Guardia (Italian and Spanish, 'guard') may refer to:

== People ==
- Guardia (surname), including a list of people with the name
- Rafael Ángel Calderón Guardia (1900–1970), Costa Rican politician
- Francisco Calderón Guardia (1906–1977), Costa Rican politician

== Places ==
=== Argentina ===
- Guardia Mitre, a municipality in Rio Negro Province

=== Italy ===
- Guardia Lombardi, a municipality in the Province of Avellino
- Guardia Perticara, a municipality in the Province of Potenza
- Guardia Piemontese, a municipality in the Province of Cosenza
- Guardia Sanframondi, a municipality in the Province of Benevento
- Villa Guardia, a municipality in the Province of Como

== Police and military forces ==
- Cuerpo Guardia de Infantería, an Argentinian police force
- Guardia Civil, the Spanish gendarmerie
- Costa Rican Civil Guard, a former gendarmerie
- Civil Guard (Peru), a gendarmery
- Guardia de Asalto, the urban police force of Spain during the Second Republic
- Guardia di Finanza, an Italian police force
- Guardia di Rocca, in San Marino
- National Guard (El Salvador), a former gendarmerie
- National Guard (Nicaragua), a Nicaraguan former militia
- Venezuelan National Guard, of the National Armed Forces of Venezuela
- National Republican Guard (Italy), a former gendarmerie
- Republican Guard (Peru), a security force
- Noble Guard, a Vatican former guard unit
- Guardia Rural, a former Mexican force

== Other uses ==
- Gvardia Dushanbe, a Tajikistan football club
- Guardia Republicana, a Peruvian football club

== See also ==
- La Guardia (disambiguation)
- Garda (disambiguation)
- Guarda (disambiguation)
- Guard (disambiguation)
- Guardian (disambiguation)
- Giardia, a genus of parasitic protozoa
