= Rakshak (disambiguation) =

Rakshak is a 1996 Indian Hindi-language action thriller film.

Rakshak may also refer to:

- Rakshakudu, a 1997 Indian film
- Rakshakan, a 2007 Indian Malayalam-language film
- Rakshak, original tentative title of Dhruva (2016 film), an Indian Telugu-language action thriller
- Rakshak, an Indian TV drama broadcast by Life OK
- Rakshak (album), by Indian folk metal band Bloodywood
- Mahindra Rakshak, armoured light military vehicle from Mahindra
- Operation Rakshak, 1994 Indian military anti-terrorist operation in Jammu and Kashmir

== See also ==
- Varudu, a 2010 Indian Telugu-language film, Hindi title Ek Aur Rakshak (lit. 'One More Rakshak [Protector]')
- Protector (disambiguation), an English translation of rakshak
- Defender (disambiguation), an English translation of rakshak
- Savior (disambiguation), an English translation of rakshak
