= Haldimand-Norfolk Housing Corporation =

Social housing organization

The Haldimand-Norfolk Housing Corporation is a social housing organization providing rental housing for senior citizens, adults, and families.

== Summary ==
This housing provider serves Haldimand County and Norfolk County in Ontario, Canada. Eligibility is limited to seniors, adults and families who demonstrate the capabilities of independent living, in addition to heads of families with at least one dependant. Prospective tenants must apply through the Social Housing Department of the Haldimand Norfolk Division of Health & Social Services. Once approved they will be placed on the Centralized Waiting List. The Haldimand Norfolk Housing Corporation also provides property management services to four local non-profit housing corporations all of which provide rent-geared-to-income housing, two of which also offer market rent housing.

HNHC offers both apartments and family housing (detached and semi-detached townhouses) and operates under current municipal and provincial legislation such as the Residential Tenancies Act and the Housing Services Act.

On February 1, 2002, the counties of Haldimand and Norfolk took over responsibilities for social housing from the Government of Ontario's Ministry of Municipal Affairs and Housing. The social housing division under the jurisdiction of the Health and Social Services Department and reports to both the Norfolk and Haldimand county councils through the Health and Social Services Advisory Committee.
