= Guardia (surname) =

Guardia is a surname. Notable people with the surname include:

- Gloria Guardia (1940–2019), Panamanian novelist
- Guillermo Guardia (born 1960), Costa Rican footballer
- Jaime Guardia (1933–2018), Peruvian singer
- Maribel Guardia (born 1959), Costa Rican actress
- Rómulo Guardia (born 1961), Venezuelan film producer
- Tomás Guardia Gutiérrez (1831–1882), Costa Rican politician
- Victoria Guardia Alvarado (born 1939), Costa Rican politician
