= 嘉德 =

嘉德, 嘉徳 or 가덕, meaning 'good, virtue', may refer to:

- China Guardian, a mainland Chinese auction house
- Gadeok of Gojoseon (315 BC died), a Gija Joseon monarch
- Princess Jiade, born name Zhao Yupan (born 1100–1141), the eldest daughter of Song dynasty Emperor Huizong
- Yoshinori Tadokoro (born 1954), Japanese politician

== See also ==
- Yoshinori
