= The Guardian (1844 Australian newspaper) =

Front page of The Guardian, Sydney, 4 March 1844

The Guardian : a weekly journal of politics, commerce, agriculture, literature, science and arts for the middle and working classes of New South Wales is a defunct Australian newspaper that was published in Sydney New South Wales, during 1844 in Sydney, New South Wales, Australia.

== History ==
The newspaper began with the edition of Saturday March 16 1844, and continued in a run of twenty four editions before ceasing publication on 5 October 1844. The newspaper was published by James McEachern, brother of Robert S. McEachern, the proprietor of the Free Press and Commercial Journal and the Sydney Free Press.

== Digitisation ==
The various editions of the paper have been digitised as part of the Australian Newspapers Digitisation Program, a project hosted by the National Library of Australia.

== See also ==
- List of newspapers in New South Wales
- List of newspapers in Australia
