= Gârda =

Gârda may refer to:

- Gârda de Sus, a commune in Alba County, Romania
- Gârda Seacă, a village in Gârda de Sus Commune, Alba County, Romania
- Gârda-Bărbulești, a village in Roșia Montană Commune, Alba County, Romania
- Gârda Seacă, a tributary of the Arieșul Mare River in Romania

== Others ==
- Gârde, a village in Bistra Commune, Alba County, Romania

== See also ==
- Garda (disambiguation)
- Gârdești (disambiguation)
