= Garda =

Garda may refer to:

- Garda Síochána, the police and security service of Ireland
- Garda National Surveillance Unit, the domestic intelligence agency of Ireland
- GardaWorld, a security and protection company headquartered in Montreal, Canada
- Garda, Veneto, a town on the shores of the Italian Lake Garda in the province of Verona
- Garda, Gotland, alternative name for Garde, a settlement on the Swedish island of Gotland
- Garda Financiară, a former Romanian control and tax law-enforcement agency
- Garda hitch, a knot used in rock climbing and rescue
- Lake Garda, a lake in northern Italy
- Idegarda Oliveira, an Angolan singer

== See also ==
- Gârda (disambiguation)
- Garde (disambiguation)
- Guarda (disambiguation)
- Guardia (disambiguation)
- Guard (disambiguation)
