= Erwin Heerich =

German artist

Erwin Heerich (29 November 1922 in Kassel – 6 November 2004 in Meerbusch, Germany) was a German artist.

== Life and work ==
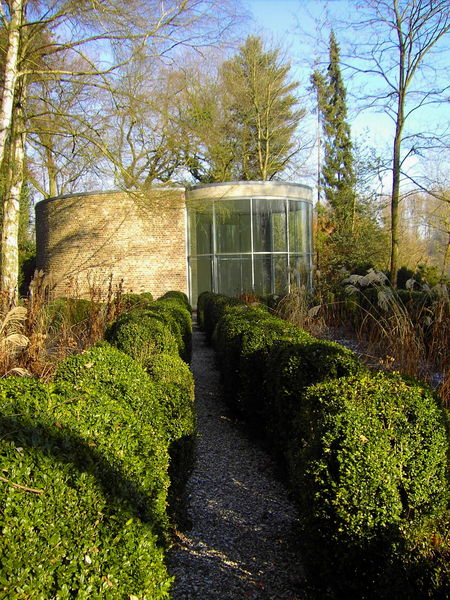
Graubner-Pavillon, Museum Insel Hombroich

From 1945 to 1950 Heerich studied fine arts at the Kunstakademie Düsseldorf under Ewald Mataré. From 1950 to 1954, he belonged, together with Joseph Beuys, to the master class of his professor. At that time, he chiefly produced sculptures representing animals and drawings of plants. In 1954, he left the Düsseldorf academy and worked as an artist and art teacher. Since 1959, he used cardboard as his artistic material. He presented 10 of these "Kartonplastiken" at the documenta IV (1968) in Kassel.

Heerich emphasized that for him, "cardboard, like polystyrene, had no specifically aesthetic or historical connotations, the materials are value-neutral to the largest possible extent." Furthermore, the artist was not primarily "concerned with the manifestation of an art object, but with making an idea material in terms of a specific problem: how space can be presented and formed."

From 1969 to 1988 he was a professor at the Kunstakademie Düsseldorf. In 1974 he became also a member of the Academy of Arts, Berlin.

From 1982 to 1994 he created eleven exhibition pavilions for the Museum Insel Hombroich, which were called "chapels in the landscape". His elemental sculptures became the design base for these gallery pavilions.

In 1978 Heerich received the Will Grohmann Prize in Berlin. In 1987 he received the Max Beckmann Prize in Frankfurt am Main and in 1995 the Anton Stankowski Prize in Stuttgart.
