= Gârdești =

Gârdeşti may refer to several villages in Romania:

- Gârdeşti, a village in Necșești Commune, Teleorman County
- Gârdeşti, a village in Voineşti Commune, Vaslui County

== See also ==
- Gârda (disambiguation)
