= Guardian (comics) =

Guardian, in comics, may refer to:

- Guardian (DC Comics), the alias of Jim Harper, a costumed hero
- Guardian (Marvel Comics), the alias of James Hudson, a superhero
- Guardian, an alias of Heather Hudson, wife of James Hudson, better known as Vindicator
- Guardians, a Marvel Comics series

== See also ==
- Guardian angel (comics), the superhero alias of Hop Harrigan
- Guardians of the Galaxy, two Marvel Comics teams
  - Guardians of the Galaxy (1969 team)
  - Guardians of the Galaxy (2008 team)
- Guardians of the Universe, DC Comics aliens who are behind the Green Lantern Corps
- New Guardians, a DC Comics team picked by the Guardians of the Universe
- Global Guardians, a DC Comics superhero team
- Guardian (Mal Duncan), also known as Vox, Hornblower, and the Herald, a DC Comics superhero

== See also ==
- Guardian (disambiguation)
