= Langen Foundation =

German museum of modern and oriental art near Neuss

Coordinates: 51°09′09″N 6°38′41″E

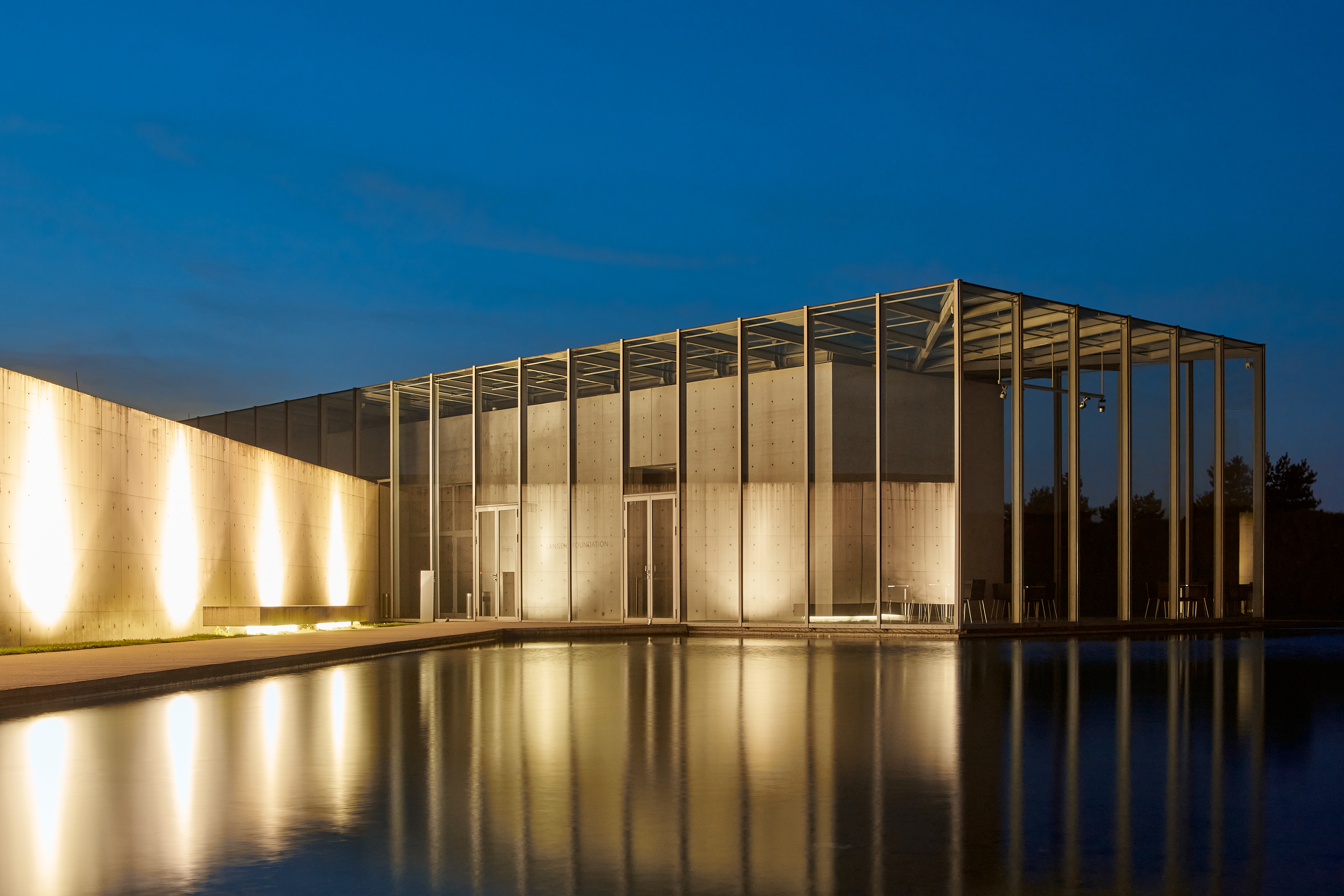
Exhibition Cubus

Langen Foundation near Neuss, North Rhine-Westphalia, Germany is a museum designed by Japanese architect Tadao Ando. The foundation showcases a collection of Oriental Art and Modern Art. It is located on the grounds of the Museum Insel Hombroich.

== History ==
Marianne Langen's collection of Japanese art, once mainly housed in Switzerland, consists of about 500 works dating from the 12th to the 19th century. Her husband, Viktor, who held several patents for technical innovations in automobile production, had traveled regularly to visit customers in Japan, where the couple's collection was formed. The Langen residencies in Meerbusch, Germany, (built by Georg Lünenborg, 1954/55) and Ascona, Switzerland, were full of paintings and sculptures that were periodically interchanged. At its height, the collection comprised around 1,180 pieces, including 300 20th-century works.

In 1979 the collectors erected a private museum in Ascona to house their collection of Japanese picture scrolls. The museum was closed in 2004. Since then the Langen Collection has been situated in the art and exhibition facility of the Langen Foundation. Marianne Langen, who paid weekly visits to the construction site, died in February 2004 without seeing the finished building.

== Architecture ==
The Langen Foundation's building was created on grounds which used to be a NATO rocket base. The building has double-skin volume and two half-buried temporary exhibition wings with a total area of 900 m^{2} (9,700 sq ft); the structure mainly consists of reinforced concrete, glass and steel. The museum offers three exhibition spaces totalling an area of 1,300 m^{2} (14,000 sq ft). Situated within the ground-level concrete slab is the so-called Japan Room – an unusually long and narrow gallery conceptualised by Ando as a space of “tranquillity” especially for the Japanese segment of the Langen Collection. The two subterranean exhibition rooms, with a ceiling height of a surprising eight metres, were in turn designed to accommodate the modern part of the collection. The museum opened to the public in 2004.

== Collection ==
Marianne and Viktor Langen acquired works of Japanese art, Asian art (from India, Cambodia, Thailand, China and Korea) and western modernism since the late 1940s.

The Langen's collection of modern art includes works from major artists such as Paul Cézanne, Max Beckmann, Andy Warhol, Mark Rothko, Jean Dubuffet, Francis Bacon, and Sigmar Polke. In addition, Viktor and Marianne Langen closely followed the Zero movement. Artists like Heinz Mack, Otto Piene, and Günther Uecker from the Langens’ Düsseldorf environment became part of the collection, as did Lucio Fontana and Yves Klein.

=== Deaccessioning ===
While the Japanese and non-European collections remain intact, in 2014 the Langen consigned ten works of art to be auctioned at Christie’s in New York, including Fernand Léger's Grande Nature Morte (1939), Georges Braque's Le Modèle (1939), Picasso's Portrait de femme (Dora Maar) (1942) and Wassily Kandinsky's Strandszene (1909).

== Exhibitions ==
Since 2010, the Langen Foundation has been collaborating with private collections across Germany, including ALTANA Art (founded by German heiress Susanne Klatten) and the Viehof Collection (established by Eugen Viehof).

== Gallery ==
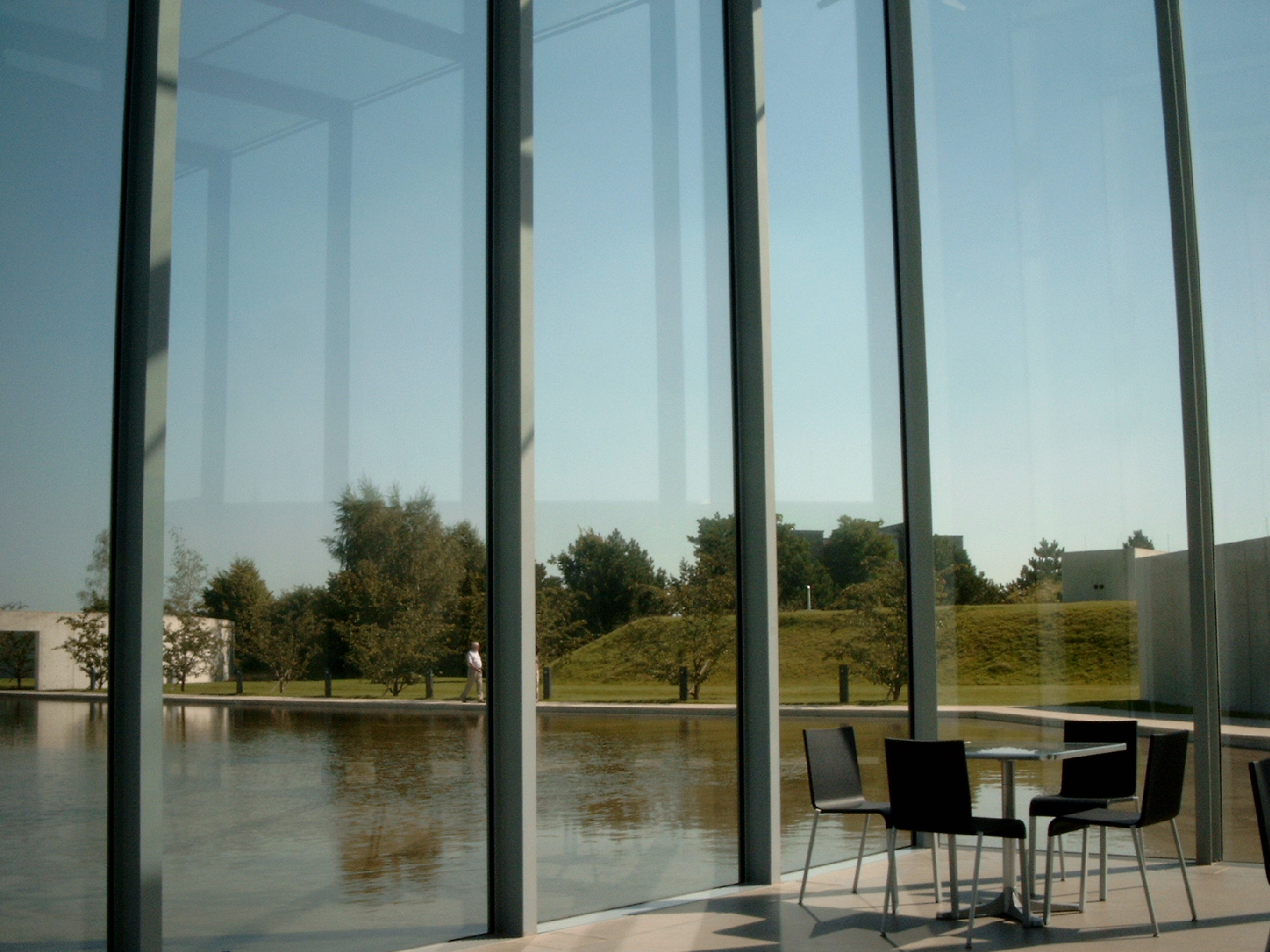
View on entrance

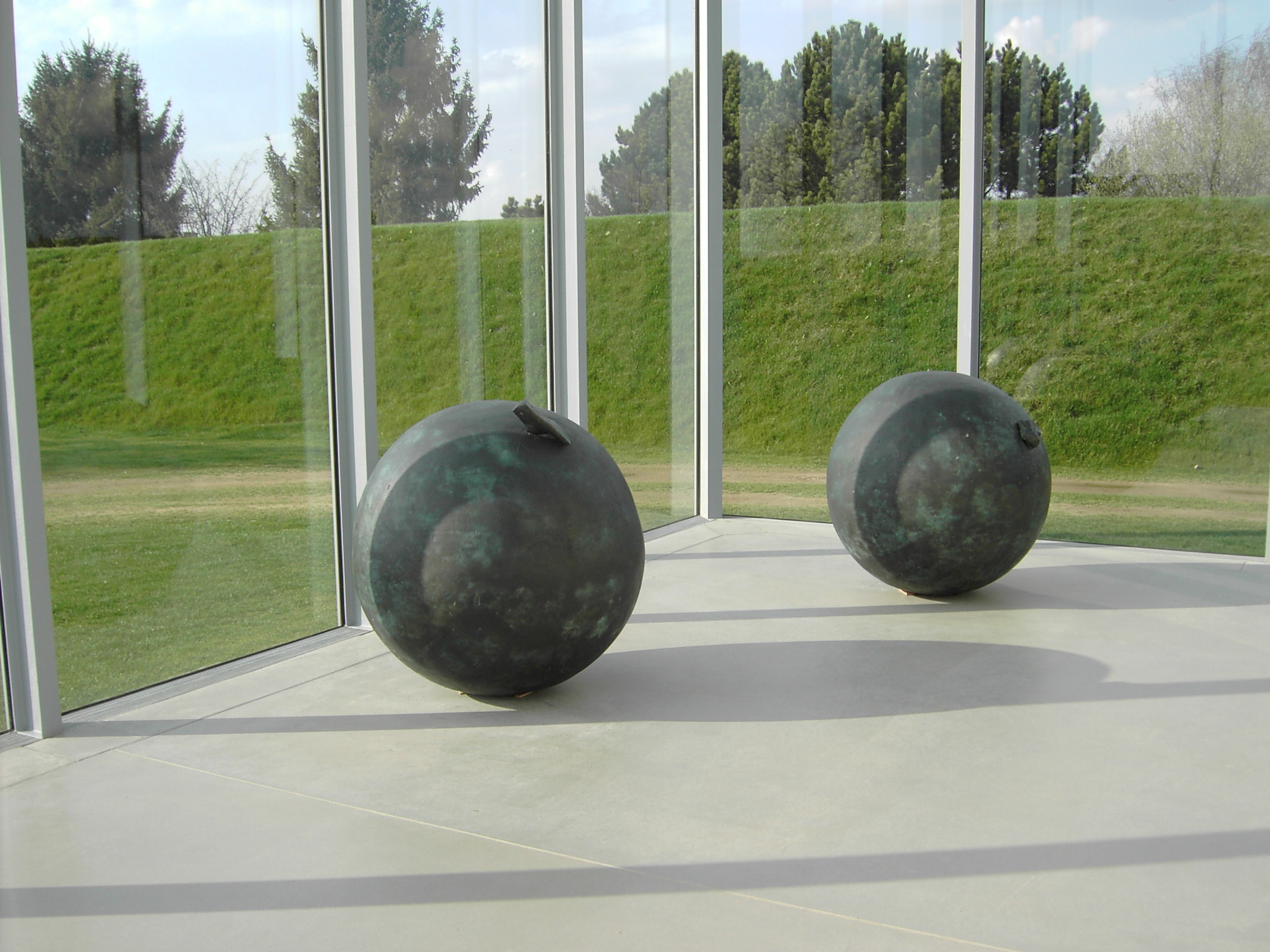
Interior view
