= Anatol Herzfeld =

German sculptor and mixed-media artist (1931–2019)

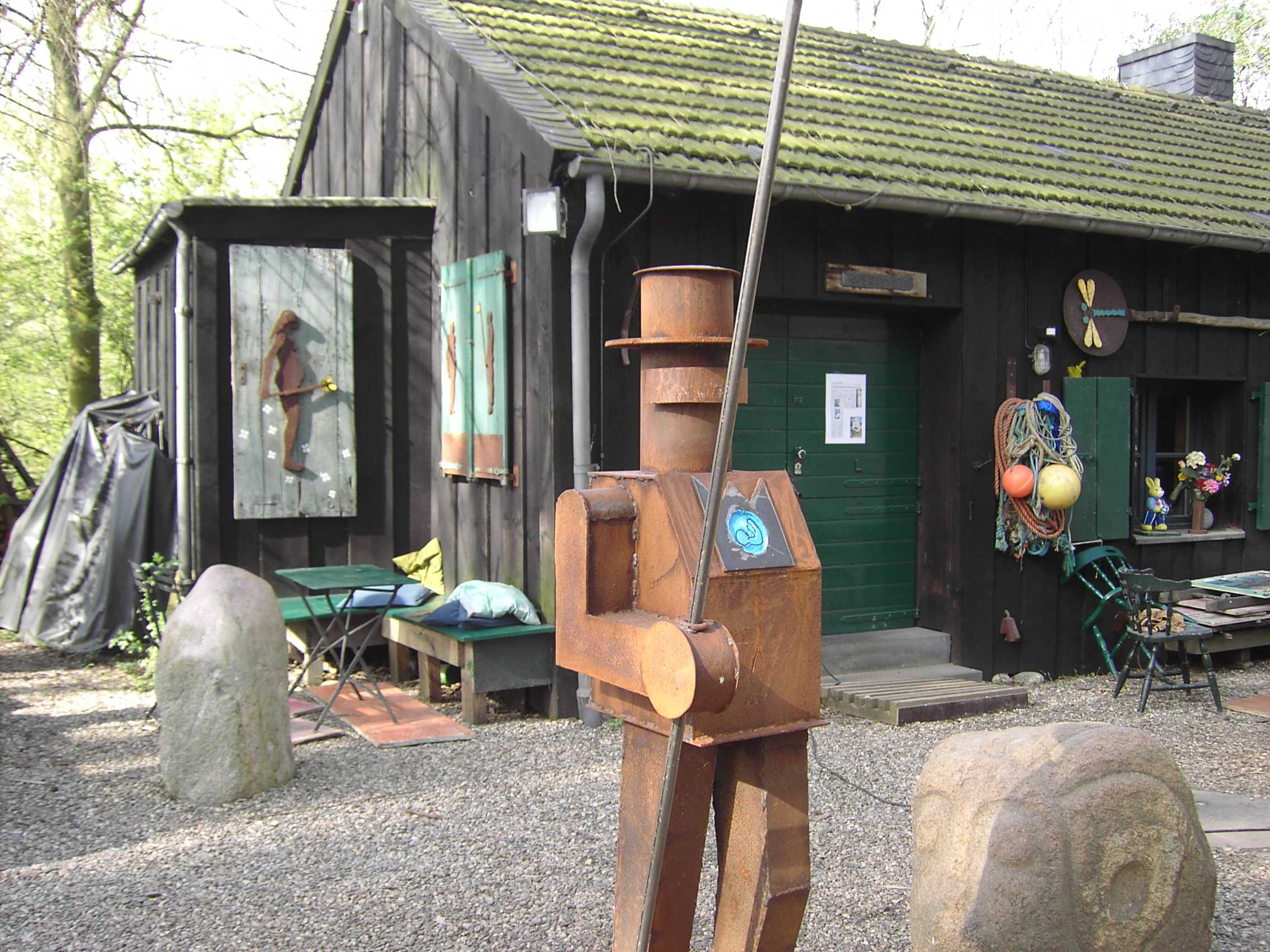
- Anatol's house and studio on the Museum Insel Hombroich
- Born: Karl-Heinz Herzfeld; 21 January 1931; Insterburg, East Prussia
- Died: 10 May 2019 (aged 88); Moers, Germany
- Other names: Anatol
- Education: Kunstakademie Düsseldorf
- Occupations: Policeman; Sculptor; Mixed-media artist; Academic teacher
- Organizations: Freie Akademie Oldenburg; Kunstakademie Düsseldorf; University of South Dakota
- Awards: Order of Merit of the Federal Republic of Germany; Lovis Corinth Prize

Anatol Herzfeld (born Karl-Heinz Herzfeld; 21 January 1931 – 10 May 2019) was a German sculptor and mixed-media artist, and also a policeman. A student of Joseph Beuys, he primarily used wood, iron and stone as materials. As an artist, he simply signed Anatol. He received attention for a happening, crossing the Rhine in a boat he created with Beuys, after Beuys had been expelled from the Kunstakademie Düsseldorf.

Anatol lived and worked on the Museum Insel Hombroich. His monumental sculptures were presented at the documenta in Kassel several times, and at the Nationalgalerie in Berlin, among others. Some of them are at international locations such as the National Assembly in Paramaribo, Suriname. On the occasion of his 80th birthday, two exhibitions were staged in his honour, one about him as an artist, the other as a policeman.

== Life and work ==
Herzfeld was born in Insterburg, East Prussia (now Chernyakhovsk, Russia). During World War II, he and his family escaped to the Rhineland, where he first was a blacksmith, then a policeman. Teaching traffic rules to school children using puppets was one of his specialties.

He studied sculpture at the Kunstakademie Düsseldorf with Joseph Beuys from 1964 to 1972. He was influenced by his professor's ideas, especially by the concept of "social sculpture". Therefore, telling stories, talking about current political themes, and working with his own hands became the basis of his artistic work. He chose his name as an artist, Anatol, after Anatole Kuragin from Tolstoy's War and Peace.

Anatol also created happenings together with Beuys. An action by Beuys and Anatol took place in the pub Creamcheese in Düsseldorf in 1968. Three of Beuys's students, Joachim Duckwitz, Ulrich Meister and Johannes Stüttgen, were shown handcuffed to a steel table made by Anatol and sitting on steel chairs. Red and green signals, operated by Anatol from a corner of the room, directed each sitter as to when they could speak. Beuys stood in the opposite corner of the room, silently making different gestures. After Beuys was expelled from the Kunstakademie in 1972, Anatol protested in an action the following year. On 20 July 1973, he placed Beuys in a dugout canoe that he had built, and they crossed the Rhine from Oberkassel, where Beuys lived, to the Akademie, in a symbolic journey of a return of his master titled Die Heimholung des Joseph Beuys.

For two years, Anatol was also a student of architect Karl Wimmenauer. Furthermore, he regularly participated in ring talks (Ringgespräche) about art theory.

In 1975, he founded the Freie Akademie Oldenburg. From 1979 to 1981, he taught art at the Kunstakademie Düsseldorf. In 1982, he settled on the Museum Insel Hombroich, running a studio in a former barn. In 1996, he was appointed honorary professor of fine arts by the University of South Dakota in Vermillion.

He died in Moers on 10 May 2019 at age 88 after a short illness.

== Exhibitions ==
Anatol's art was presented in exhibitions including:

- 1972: documenta 5, Fridericianum, Kassel
- 1976: „mit-, neben-, gegen“ Beuys und seine Klasse, Frankfurter Kunstverein, Frankfurt
- 1977: documenta 6, Fridericianum, Kassel
- 1982: documenta 7, Karlsaue, Kassel
- 1983: Nationalgalerie, Berlin
- 1985: Antonius Höckelmann / Anatol Herzfeld, Kunstverein für die Rheinlande und Westfalen, Düsseldorf
- 2002: Städtische Galerie im Park Viersen, Viersen
- 2011: Exhibition on the occasion on his 80th birthday, Museum Bochum
- 2014: Anatol. Arbeiten aus der Sammlung Gertz., Museum Ratingen

== Works ==
- Die Schule, Museum Insel Hombroich, Neuss
- Die Jade (1975), Dangast
- Das Traumschiff Tante Olga (1976), documenta 5 in Kassel, then Heinrich-Schütz-Schule there
- Die Neue Jade (1979), Dangast
- Die Kirche (1988), Museum Insel Hombroich, Neuss
- Triptychon (1991), St. Agnes, Cologne
- Das Parlament (1991), Museum Insel Hombroich, Neuss
- Eisenmänner / Wächter (1993), Museum Insel Hombroich, Neuss
- Die Wächter der Goitzsche (2000), Bitterfeld
- Die Wächter der Kinder (2002), Viersen
- Ur-Haus (2004), Busan, South Korea
- Heilkunst (2005), Graz, Austria
- Head of Joseph Beuys (2008), Meerbusch-Büderich
- Wächter (2010/2011), Selm-Bork
- Demokratie, National Assembly in Paramaribo, Suriname

== Awards ==
- 1991 Cross of the Order of Merit of the Federal Republic of Germany
- 1992 Lovis Corinth Prize

== Gallery ==
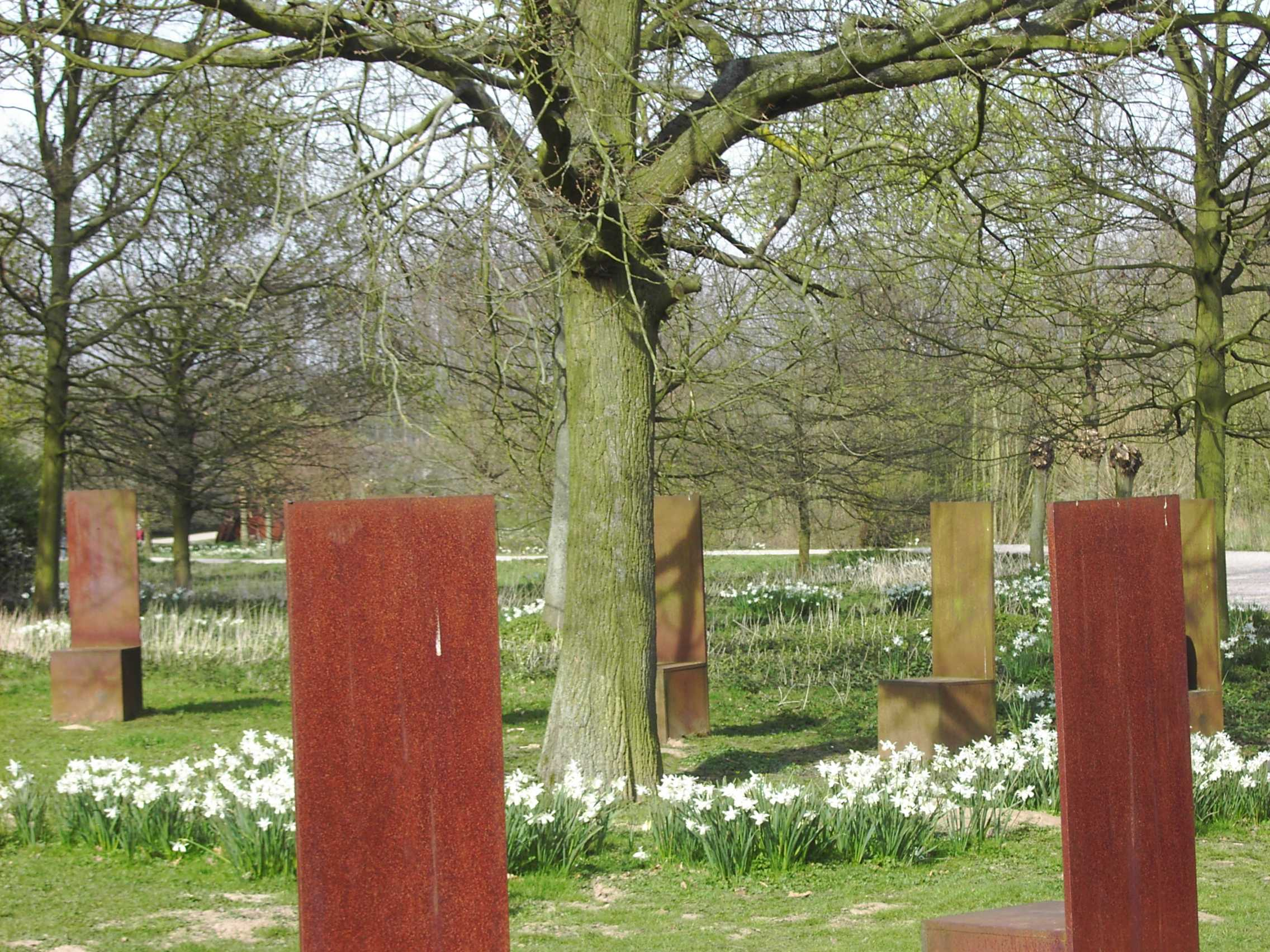
Parlament, Museum Insel Hombroich

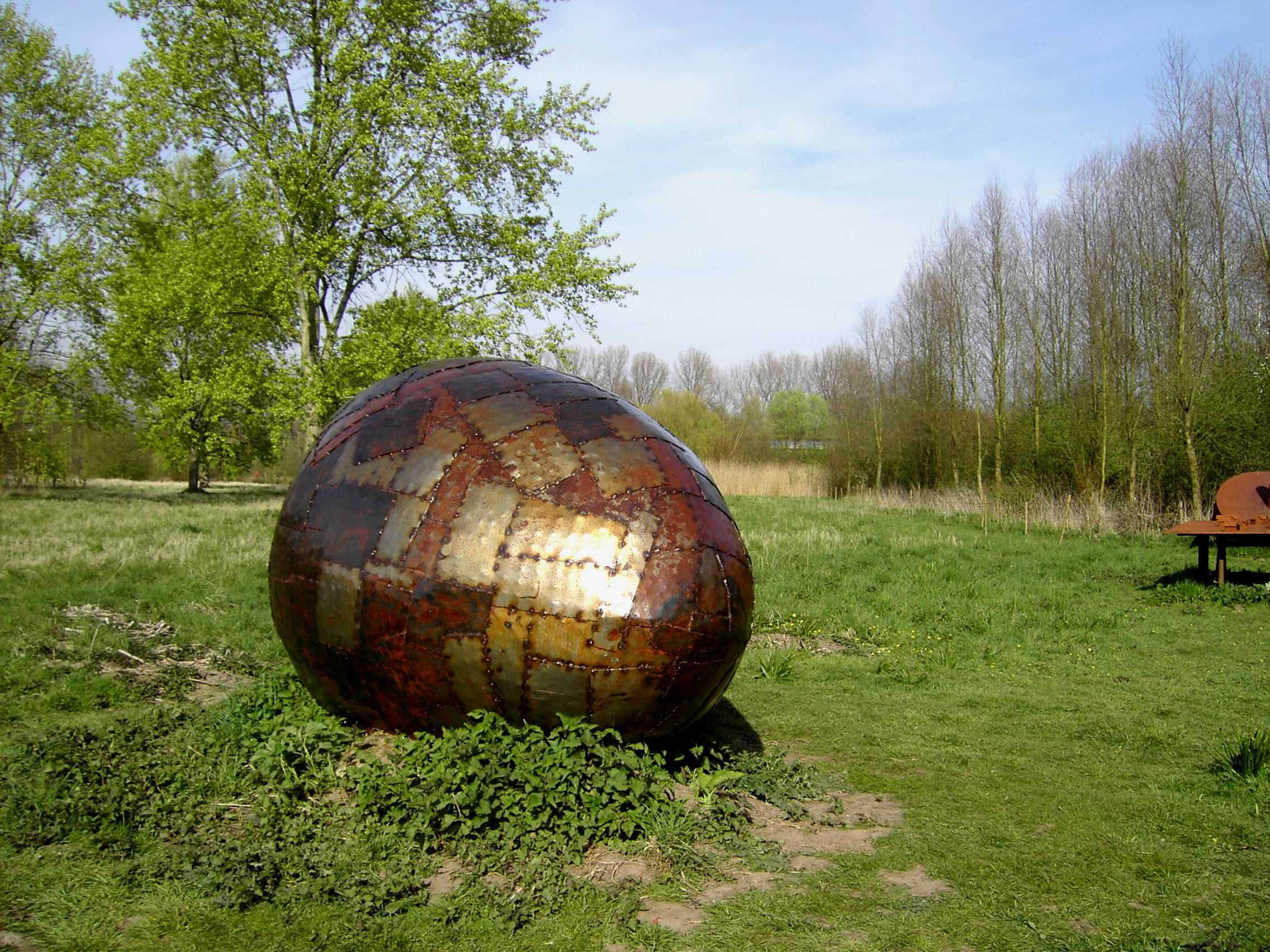
Osterei, Museum Insel Hombroich

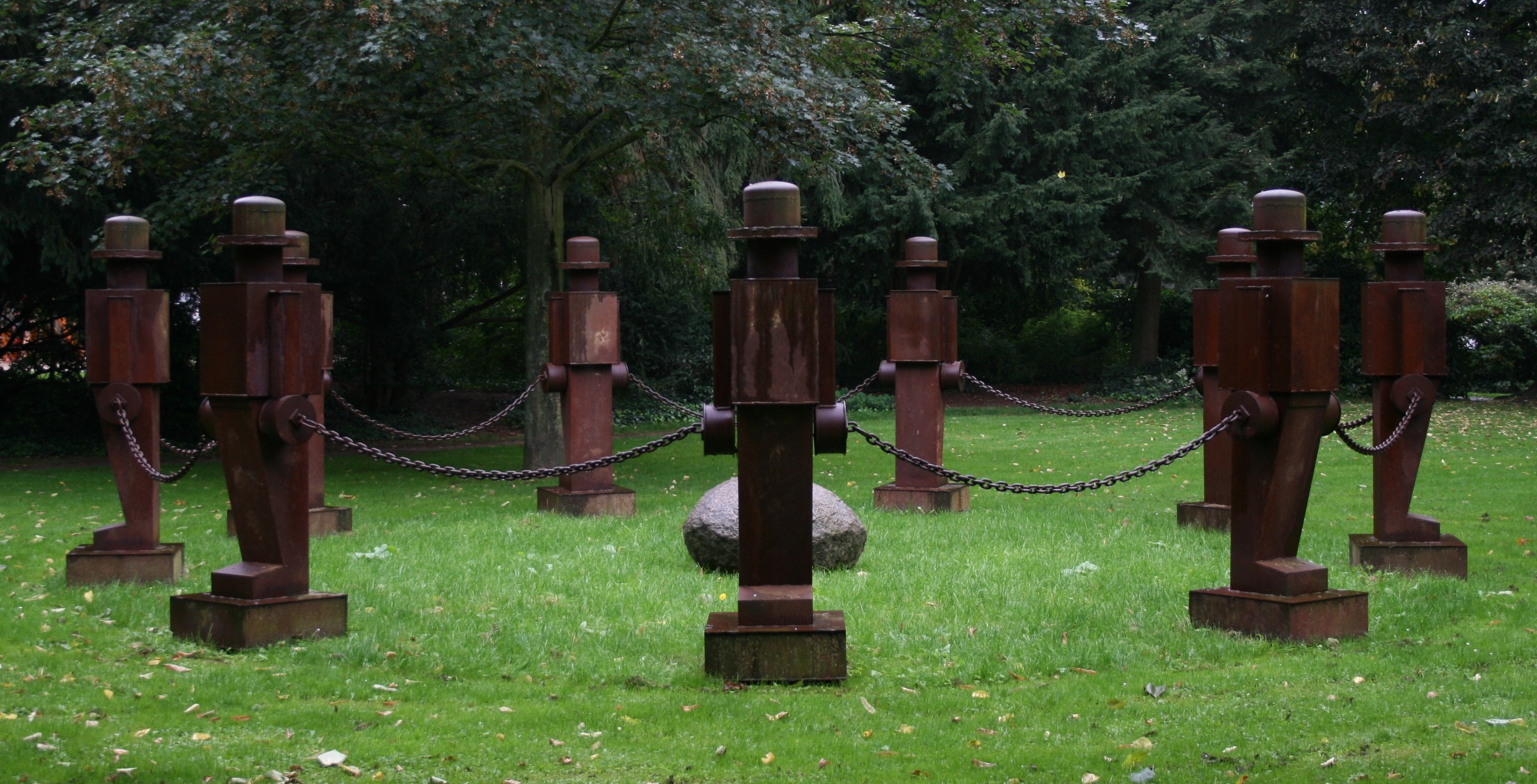
Die Wächter der Kinder, Viersen

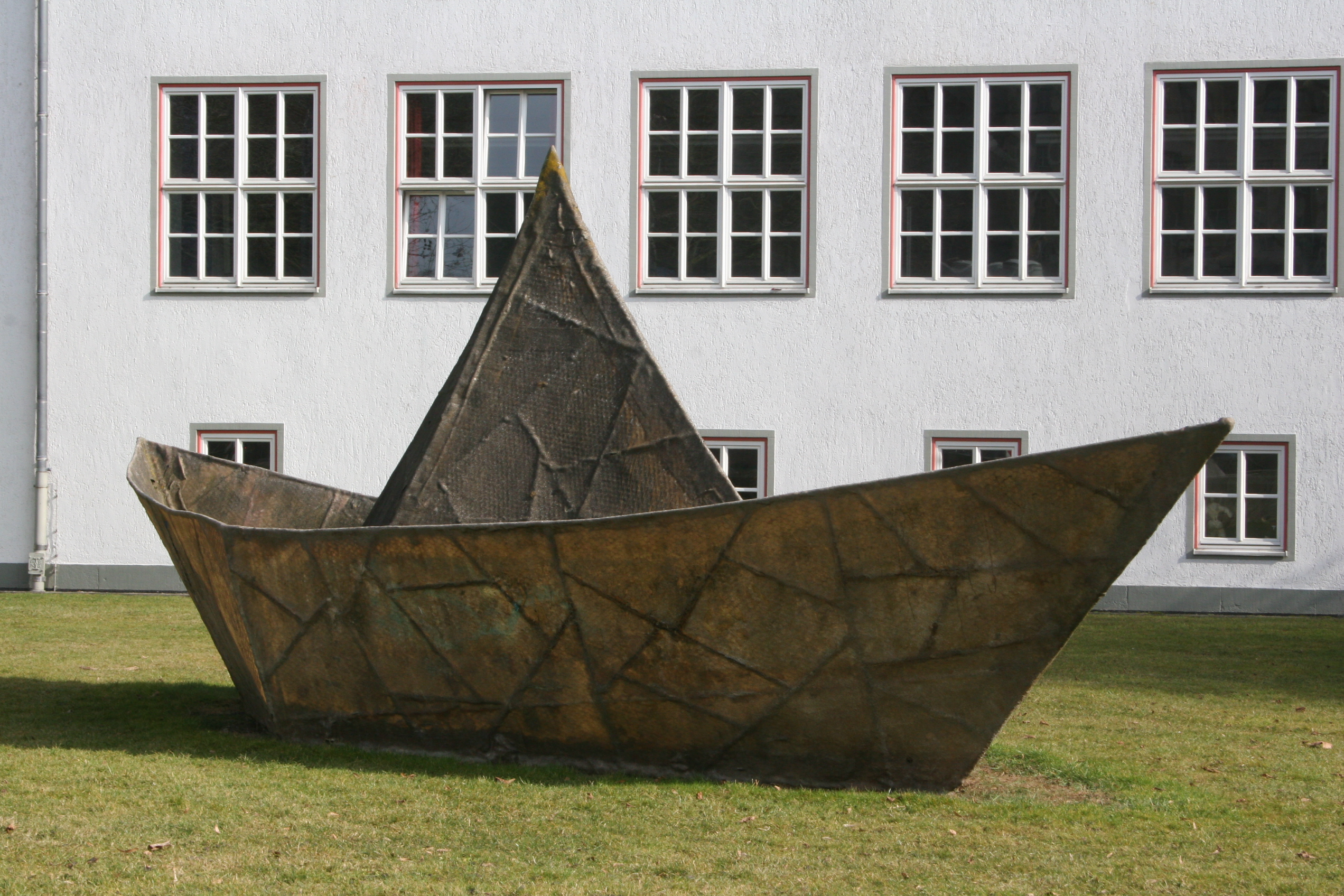
Traumschiff Tante Olga, Kassel

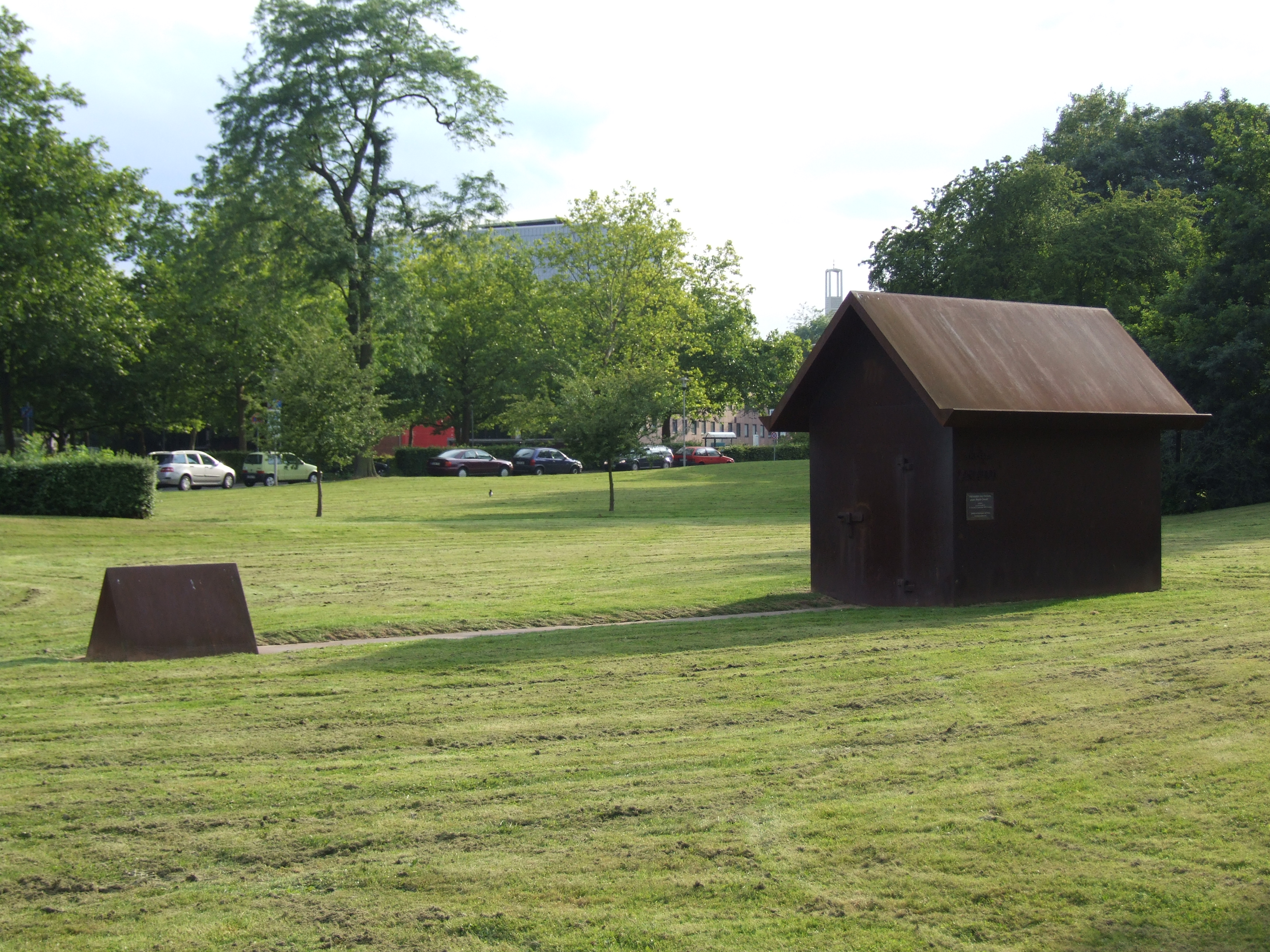
Wachstation des Denkens gegen illegale Gewalt, Kassel

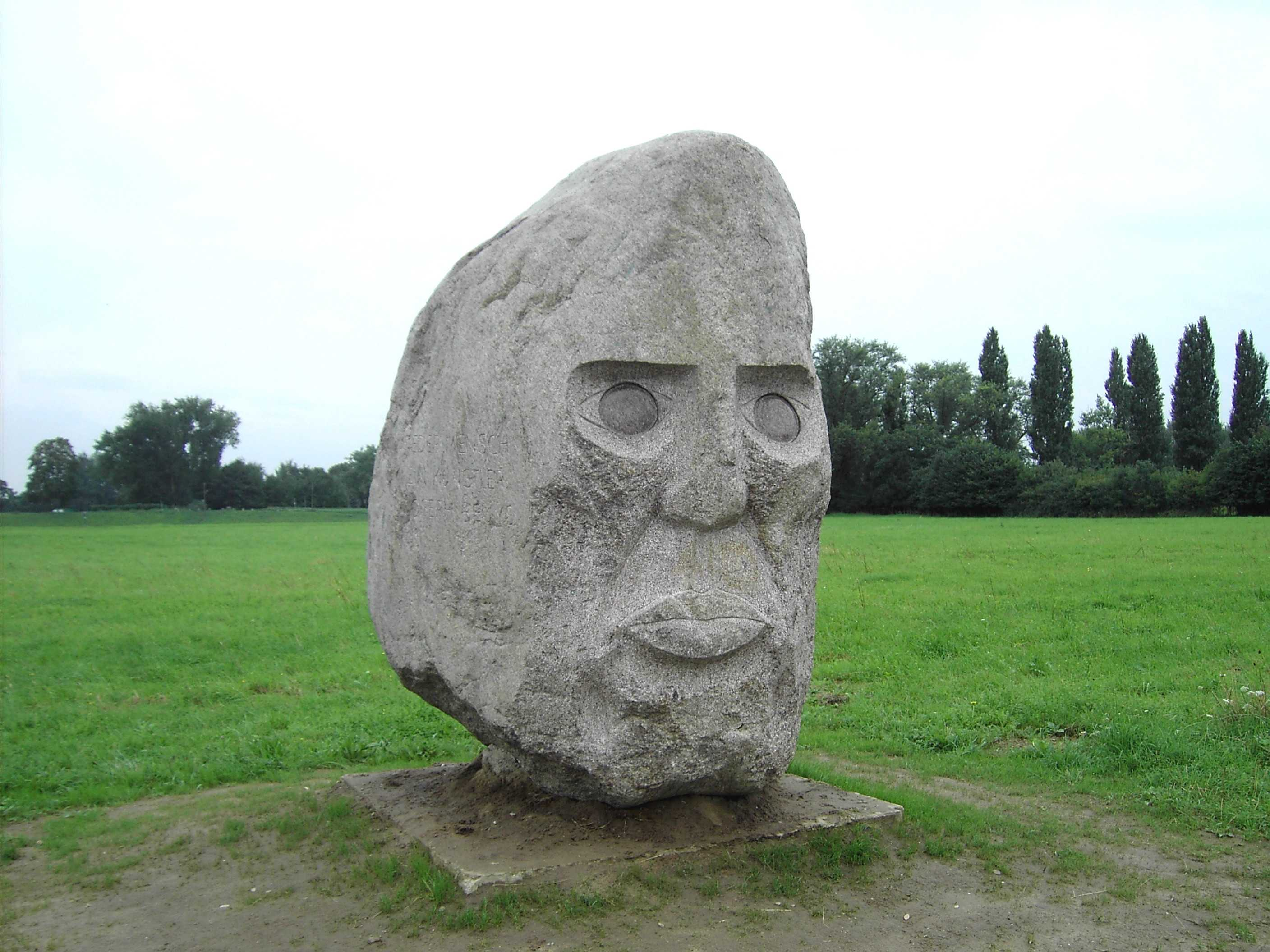
Head of Joseph Beuys, Meerbusch-Büderich
