= Wächter (Anatol) =

Sculpture series by Anatol Herzfeld

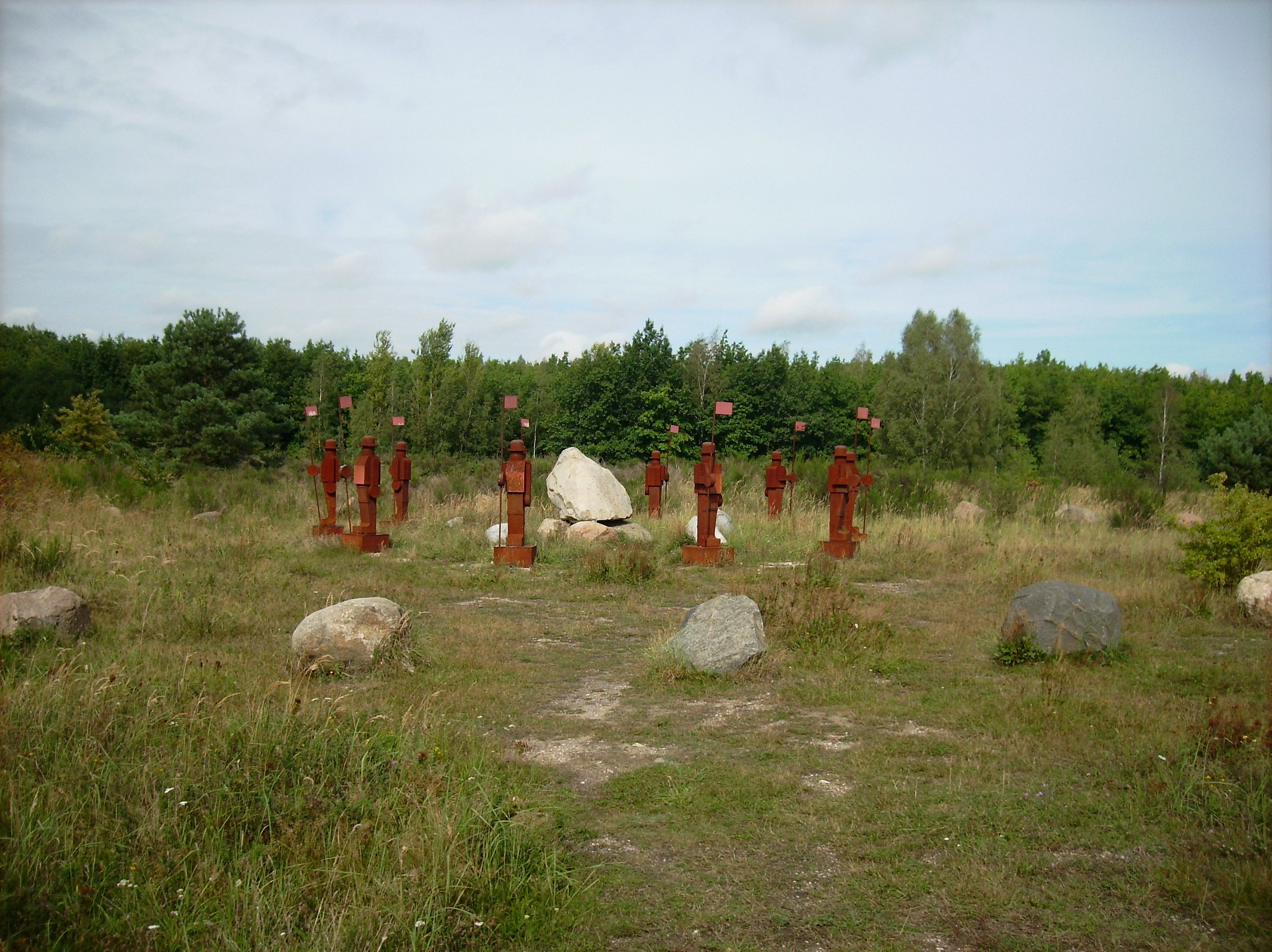
- Wächter der Goitzsche
- Artist: Anatol
- Year: 2000
- Type: Sculpture
- Medium: Iron
- Subject: Guardians
- Dimensions: 9271 x 8915 x 10236
- Location: Bitterfeld, Saxony-Anhalt

Wächter (German: [ˈvɛçtər], Guards or Guardians, also singular) is a series of large outdoor iron sculptures by Anatol Herzfeld, a student of Joseph Beuys who was both a traffic policeman and an artist, with a recurring theme. The sculptures are located at various places in Germany. One of them watches over a positive change in the environment, another is a monument to policemen killed in the line of duty.

== Background ==
Anatol Herzfeld was born in Insterburg, East Prussia (now Chernyakhovsk, Russia) on 21 January 1931. During World War II, he and his family escaped to the Rhineland, where he first was a blacksmith and then a policeman. Teaching traffic rules to school children using puppets was one of his specialties. He studied sculpture at the Kunstakademie Düsseldorf with Joseph Beuys from 1964 to 1972. As an artist, he was known as Anatol. In 1982, he settled on the Museum Island of Hombroich near Düsseldorf, running a studio in a former barn.

In a radio feature about Anatol, the function of the Wächter has been described as watching, defending and enlightening. Anatol is quoted:

Ich war ja Verkehrspolizist. Und wenn Sie draußen sind, da sehen Sie diese Eisenkerle, das sind die Wächter. Und der Wächter hat ja was mit dem Beruf des Polizeibeamten nicht nur zu tun, sondern der Polizeibeamte ist ja ein Wächter. Der Wächter wird hingestellt, um das Geschehen zu beobachten und Gefahren abzuwehren und die Verdunkelung einer Sache zu verhüten. Es darf nicht nach einer Tat verdunkelt werden. Sondern aufgeklärt werden. Für uns alle.

I was actually a traffic policeman. And when you are outside, you see those iron guys; they're guardians. And a guardian is not just someone with something in common with the profession of police officers; the police officer is a guardian. A guardian is placed there to observe what is happening, ward off dangers and prevent something from being concealed. After a crime is committed, it must be cleared up, not covered up. For all of us.

— Anatol Herzfeld

== Sculptures ==
Several of Anatol's monumental outdoor sculptures are called Wächter (Guards or Guardians), early ones also Eisenmänner (Iron Men):

- Eisenmänner / Wächter (1993), Museum Insel Hombroich, Neuss
- Wächter der Goitzsche (2000), Bitterfeld
- Die Wächter der Kinder (2002), Viersen
- Wächter, Neuss, inner court of the town hall
- Wächter (2010/2011), Selm-Bork

=== Wächter der Goitzsche ===
Wächter der Goitzsche (Guards of the Goitzsche) is the title of a group of up to ten large figures by Anatol. The group is one of 14 art installations at the Landschaftspark Goitzsche in Bitterfeld, Saxony-Anhalt, and is located on the western shore of the Paupitzscher See. The park was renaturalised from a former brown coal mining area, and the Wächter watch over the process.

=== Die Wächter der Kinder ===
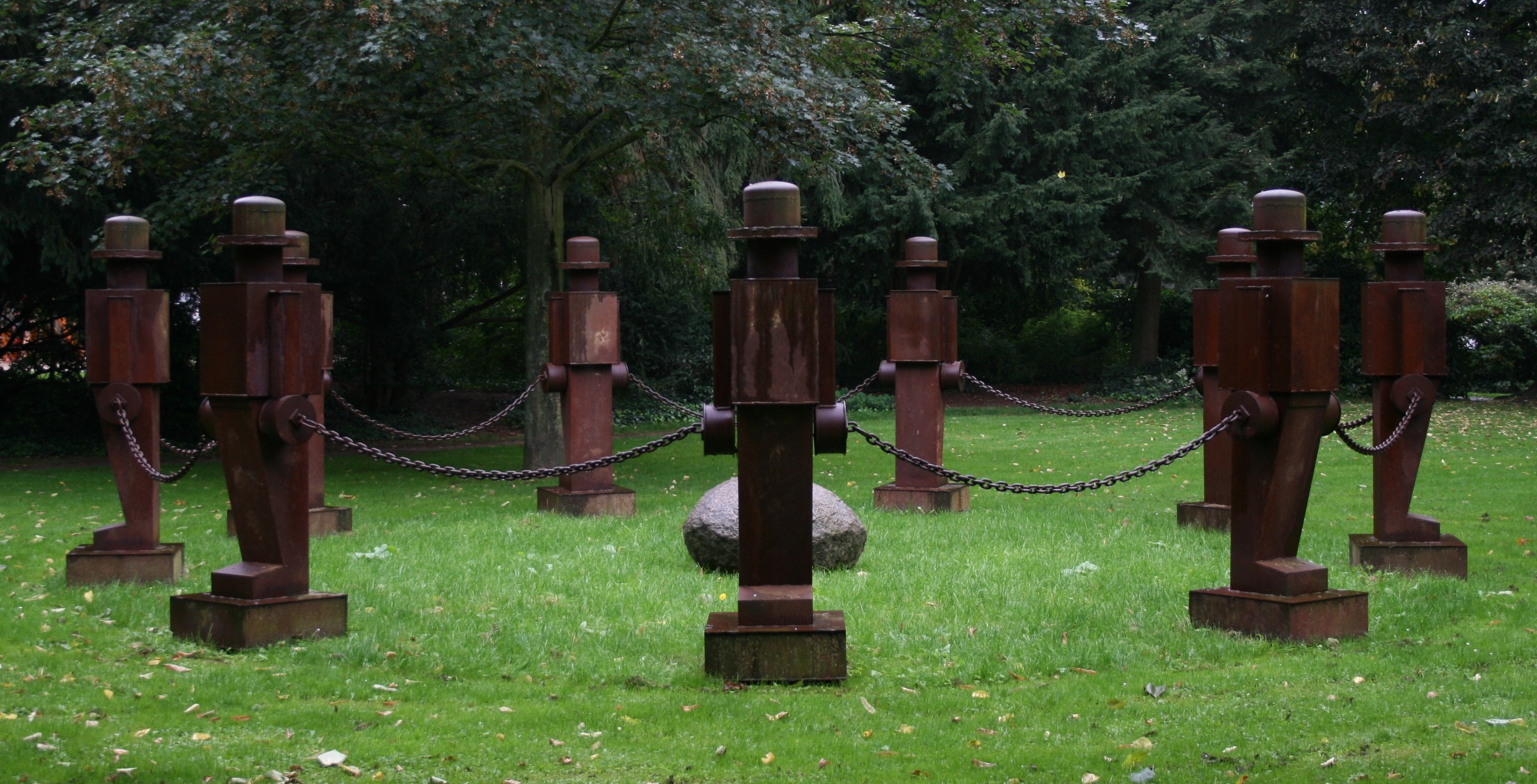
- Die Wächter der Kinder
- Year: 2002
- Subject: The Guardians of the Children
- Location: Viersen

Die Wächter der Kinder (The Guardians of the Children) is a group of iron figures located at the Casinogarten park in Viersen.

=== Wächter ===
Wächter (Guard) is an iron sculpture of one large figure with surrounding glacial erratics (Findlinge), placed in 2011 at the Landespolizeischule in Selm-Bork, a training and convention centre for the police, as a monument for police officers from North Rhine-Westphalia who were killed in the line of duty.

== See also ==
- Guardian stones
