= Dependant =

Person who relies on another as a primary source of income

A dependant (US spelling: dependent) is a person who relies on another as a primary source of income and usually assistance with activities of daily living. A common-law spouse who is financially supported by their partner may also be included in this definition. In some jurisdictions, supporting a dependant may enable the provider to claim a tax deduction.

In the United Kingdom, a full-time student in higher education who financially supports another adult may qualify for an Adult Dependant's Grant.

== Taxation ==
In the United States, a taxpayer may claim exemptions for their dependants.

== See also ==
- Military dependent
- Independent
- Guardian
- Minor
