= Lancaster Volunteer Ambulance Corps =

- Established: 1953
- Headquarters: 40 Embry Place, Lancaster, NY 14086
- Jurisdiction: Town of Lancaster, New York, Village of Lancaster, New York, Village of Depew, New York, Village of Alden, New York, Town of Alden, New York
- BLS or ALS: ALS
- Ambulances: 8
- Chief: 4 Supervisors
- Medical director: Joseph Bart, DO
- Responses: 6,000
- Website: lancasterambulance.org

The Lancaster Volunteer Ambulance Corps, also known as the LVAC and simply as Lancaster Ambulance, is a not-for-profit (501c3) EMS agency in Lancaster, New York. The Corps primary response area is the Village & Town of Lancaster, the Village of Depew and the Village & Town of Alden, New York. It also responds to areas via mutual aid agreements and requests for service. LVAC responds 24 hours a day, 365 days a year. The LVAC is a combination EMS agency, having a career staff on duty 24/7 and supplemented by a volunteer staff. Lancaster Ambulance covers a population of about 90,000 people in a geographic area of approximately 83 square miles and responds to over 6,000 EMS requests a year. The Lancaster Volunteer Ambulance Corps is dispatched by the Lancaster Police Department and receives online medical direction through the Erie County Medical Center.

== History ==
The Lancaster Volunteer Ambulance Corps was formed initially as the Lancaster Town Police Ambulance Service. Residents at the time were concerned due to delayed response times of ambulances coming from the nearby city of Buffalo, New York. Initially, the Dresser Railcar Factory in Depew donated a used 1947 Mercury ambulance to be used for the new ambulance service. On duty police officers were summoned when a rescue call came in, and they would drive to the police station to pick up the ambulance and go to the call. However, the Auxiliary police officers were invaluable to this operation as well. They would be called at home or spend time at the garage where the ambulance was quartered. Generally during daytime hours the active police would respond and at night the auxiliary police would respond to requests for the ambulance. The last surviving founding member, former Auxiliary police officer and former Director At Large Paul Welker is still active in the Corps. In those initial years, the ambulance fleet included over the years a 1955 Cadillac ambulance, a 1955 Ford Emergency Truck and a 1962 Pontiac ambulance to just name a few.

In the early 1970s the Lancaster Town Police Department, no longer wishing to be in the ambulance service, allowed its members to form the Lancaster Volunteer Ambulance Corps. In 1975, the Lancaster Volunteer Ambulance Corps was incorporated as a separate entity. However, the police department & ambulance corps have an excellent working relationship till this day. The original ambulance corps was housed behind Lancaster Town Hall on Clark Street in a cramped two bay garage until 1996.

Lancaster Ambulance responds with the Lancaster Police Department as well as the Depew Police Department to all EMS calls within the Village boundaries. Both the Lancaster & Depew Fire Departments only respond if requested by EMS (such as a lift assist or a motor vehicle accident). Day to day EMS calls are not handled by either village's fire departments. Within the Town of Lancaster, Lancaster Ambulance responds with the Bowmansville Volunteer Fire Association, Town Line Fire Department, Twin District Fire Company & the Millgrove Volunteer Fire Department.

As of the summer of 2016, due to AMR (American Medical Response) cancelling their contracts, the Town of Alden and Village of Alden are now covered by the LVAC. LVAC is the primary ambulance service for the Town of Alden and primary ALS backup for the Village of Alden as their Fire Department operates two BLS ambulances. In late 2017, Lancaster Ambulance became the primary EMS response service to the New York State Thruway from the Transit Road (Depew) ramp to the Erie County Line eastbound.

== Fleet ==
The Corps currently operates eight (8) ambulances: one (1) 2005 Braun type-3 ambulance, one (1) 2006 Braun type-3 ambulance, one(1)2009 Road Rescue type-3, one (1)2012 McCoy Miller Guardian II Type II van ambulance, (2) McCoy Miller Guardian Type II van ambulances, and (2) Ford Transit Van Ambulances 802,803,824,826, 827 culminate our frontline apparatus with 800 and 801 and 825 as our spare/reserve apparatus.

Also available as a response vehicle is a 2010 Chevrolet Tahoe ALS flycar (700). 700 is also utilized as a Special Services vehicle for transport of the Emergency Bicycle Unit & SWAT Medics. A Special Operations trailer is available for transport of equipment, EBU Bicycles, and other items for Special Events.

The Director of Operations has their own response vehicle, (900). This vehicle was the prior 700 flycar vehicle. Previously, the Corps did operate a BLS flycar (701) and an assistant DO vehicle (901), but were sold to streamline finances and lower worker's comp costs. Also available in the fleet are (4) Smith & Wesson Tactical Mountain Bikes. The designated ambulance numbers for the LVAC are 800,801,802,803,824,825,826 and 827.

== Ambulance Station ==
In 1996, the Lancaster Volunteer Ambulance Corps relocated to a new, more modern and much larger ambulance station located at 40 Embry Place. This site was chosen due to it being centrally located within the vast ambulance district. The station is equipped with 5 apparatus bays which houses the 6 ambulances and 1 flycar. A living room (squad room), kitchen, dispatch center, training room, as well as offices and sleeping quarters for crews. As the station houses crews 24/7/365, the station is always staffed by personnel at any given time. With an increased call volume & increasing population, the Corps is looking in the future at expansion of bays & office/ training and community space to the current headquarters.

== Standard Equipment ==
Standard equipment on each ambulance includes some of the following: a Life Pak LP 15/ Zoll M Series cardiac monitor; epinephrine auto-injectors (Epi-Pen); oxygen administered via nasal cannulas; non rebreathing masks and bag valve masks; various length splints; stairchair; oral glucose; sterile gauze bandages and medical tape; blood pressure cuffs; oral suction device. Various immobilization equipment such as backboards, topdecks, KED's are on board each ambulance as well. As well ALS providers carry various medications such as Zofran, Albuterol, Nitroglycerin, Aspirin, Morphine, Epinephrine etc. In addition, 700 has a RAD-57 CO detector, which is invaluable at a medical scene to rule out possible Carbon Monoxide poisoning. The RAD-57 is used to measure CO levels in a patient's bloodstream. Again, this tool is unheard of in local EMS agencies.
