= Museum Insel Hombroich =

Park and museum in Neuss, Germany

Coordinates: 51°08′38″N 6°39′29″E

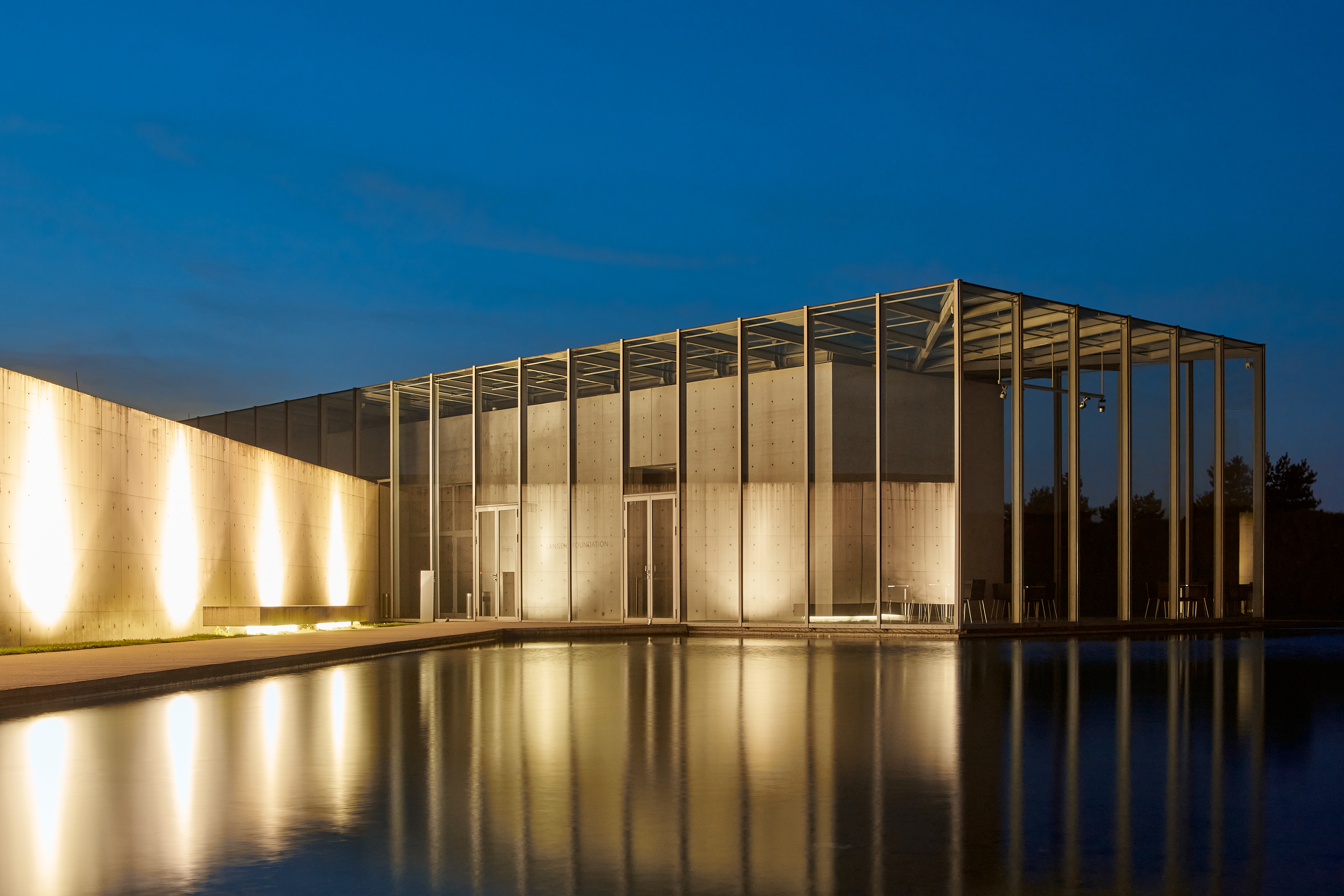
Exhibition Cubus of the Langen Foundation, Museum Insel Hombroich

The Museum Insel Hombroich (Museum Island Hombroich), Neuss, North Rhine-Westphalia, Germany, is both a park and a museum combining architecture, art and nature on over 62 acres (25 ha) of meadowland. The park includes the "Kirkeby-Feld" and the "Raketenstation" ("rocket station"), a disused NATO missile base. The museum located on the Museum Island is called "Museum Insel Hombroich". It presents both antique art from Asia and modern art. The Museum and the grounds around it are part of the "Stiftung Insel Hombroich", which was founded in 1996.

The inception of the Museum Insel Hombroich occurred in 1982 when real estate agent and art collector Karl Heinrich Müller purchased Rosa Haus ("Pink House"), an overgrown industrialist's villa with a garden, which was built in 1816. Müller's intended to support local artists and architects. Landscape architect Bernhard Korte, who was commissioned to redesign the park, restored the old gardens and created minimalist landscapes. From 1982 to 1994 sculptor Erwin Heerich created eleven exhibition pavilions, which Müller called "chapels in the landscape". Heerich's elemental sculptures became the design base for these gallery pavilions.

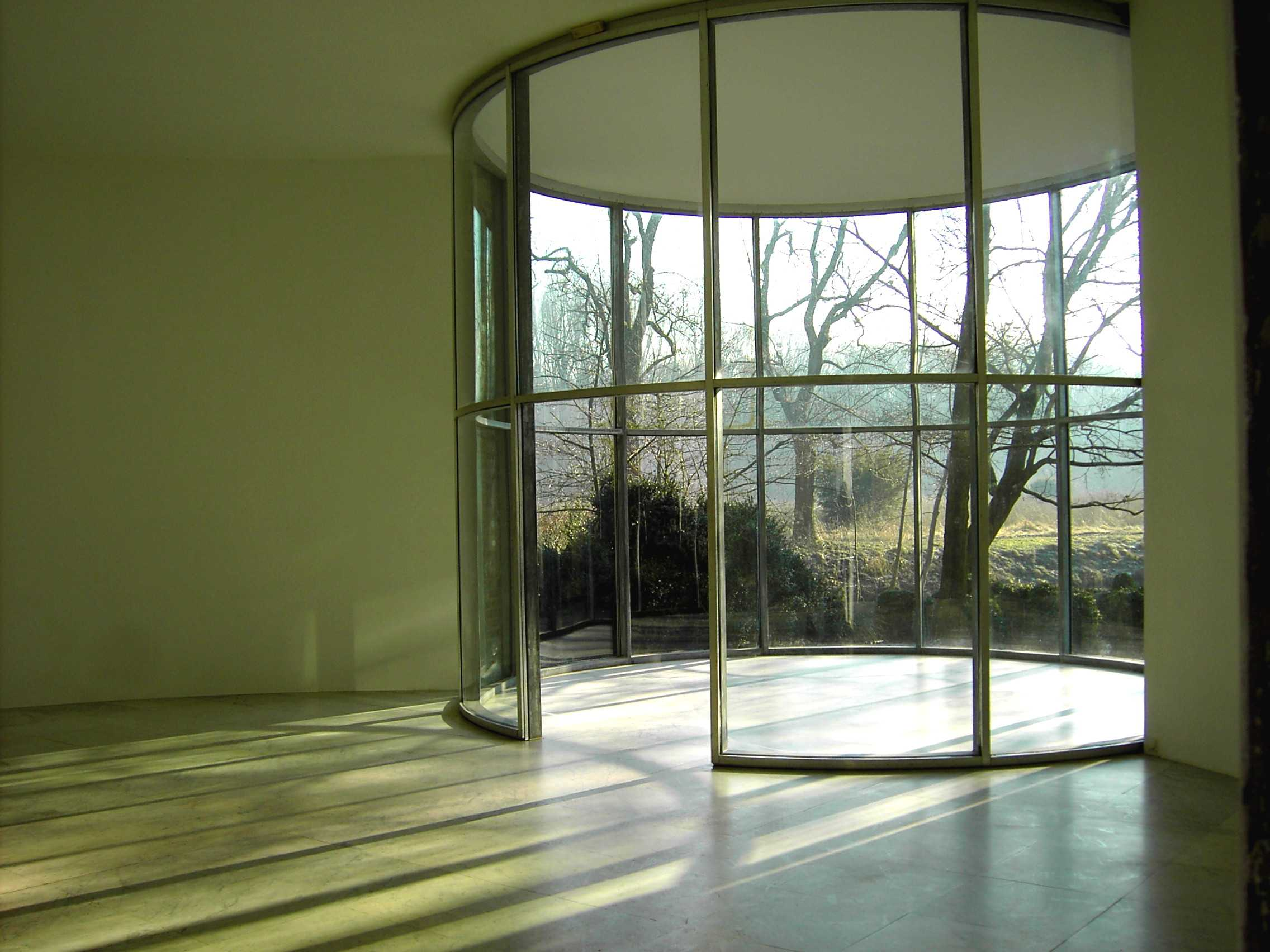
Erwin Heerich, Graubner Pavilion

The buildings include artworks from the collection of Karl Heinrich Müller, among them works by Hans Arp, Alexander Calder, Paul Cézanne, Eduardo Chillida, Lovis Corinth, Jean Fautrier, Alberto Giacometti, Yves Klein, Gustav Klimt, Henri Matisse, Francis Picabia, Rembrandt, Kurt Schwitters, and works from early China.

Artists retired from the Kunstakademie Düsseldorf took up residence on the Museum Island, among them Anatol, who set up his studio in a former barn, and the late Gotthard Graubner.

Between 1995 and 2009, Portuguese architect Álvaro Siza Vieira has been working on an architecture museum on Hombroich island, completed in collaboration with Rudolf Finsterwalder.

In 2015, the Danish-Icelandic artist Ólafur Elíasson exhibited some 40 of his works from the Boros Collection in the rooms of the Langen Foundation.
