= Yoshinori =

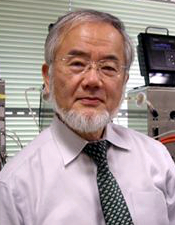
- Yoshinori Osumi, Japanese cell biologist, 2016 Nobel Prize winner
- Pronunciation: joɕinoɾi (IPA)
- Gender: Male

Origin
- Origin: Japanese
- Meaning: Different meanings depending on the kanji used

Other names
- Alternative spelling: Yosinori (Kunrei-shiki) Yosinori (Nihon-shiki) Yoshinori (Hepburn)

Yoshinori is a masculine Japanese given name.

== Written forms ==
Yoshinori can be written using many different combinations of kanji characters. Here are some examples:

- 義徳, "justice, virtue"
- 義憲, "justice, constitution"
- 義法, "justice, method"
- 義教, "justice, teach"
- 義典, "justice, law code"
- 義紀, "justice, chronicle"
- 義礼, "justice, manners"
- 佳規, "skilled, measure"
- 佳徳, "skilled, virtue"
- 佳憲, "skilled, constitution"
- 善載, "virtuous, to carry"
- 吉紀, "good luck, chronicle"
- 吉典, "good luck, law code"
- 良紀, "good, chronicle"
- 恭徳, "respectful, virtue"

The name can also be written in hiragana よしのり or katakana ヨシノリ.

== Notable people with the name ==
- Yoshinori Abe (阿部 良則; born 1972), Japanese footballer
- Yoshinori Fujita (藤田 圭宣, born 1976), Japanese voice actor
- Yoshinori Ishigami (石神 良訓; born 1957), Japanese footballer
- Yoshinori Kanada (金田 伊功, 1952–2009), Japanese animator
- Yoshinori Kitase (北瀬 佳範, born 1966), Japanese game producer
- Yoshinori Kobayashi (小林 善範, born 1953), Japanese conservative author and manga artist
- Yoshinori Kumada (熊田 喜則; born 1961), Japanese footballer and manager
- Yoshinori Muto (武藤 嘉紀, born 1992), Japanese footballer
- Yoshinori Oguchi (大口 善徳, born 1955), Japanese politician
- Yoshinori Ohno (大野 功統, born 1935), former Japanese Minister of Defense
- Yoshinori Osumi (大隅 良典, born 1945), Japanese cell biologist
- Yoshinori Tokura (十倉 好紀, born 1954), Japanese physicist
- Yoshinori Shimizu (清水 義範; born 1947), Japanese writer
- Yoshinori Shimizu (basketball) (清水 良規; born 1949), Japanese basketball player, coach and executive
- Yoshinori Shirakawa (白川 義則, 1869–1932), general in the Imperial Japanese Army
- Yoshinori Suematsu (末松 義規, born 1956), Japanese politician of the Democratic Party of Japan
- Yoshinori Sunahara (砂原 良徳, born 1969), Japanese DJ and club programmer
- Yoshinori Watanabe (渡辺 芳則, born 1941), kumicho of the Yamaguchi-gumi, Japan's largest yakuza organization
- Yoshinori Ashikaga (足利 義教, 1394–1441), Ashikaga shogunate
- Yoshinori Koguchi (古口 美範, born 1969), Japanese professional drifting driver
- Yoshinori Maeda (前田 吉徳, 1690–1745), Japanese daimyō
- Yoshinori Natsume (夏目 義徳, born 1975), Japanese manga artist
- Yoshinori Okada (岡田 義徳, born 1977), Japanese actor
- Yoshinori Sato (佐藤 由規, born 1989), Japanese professional baseball player
- Yoshinori Taguchi (田口 禎則, born 1965), Japanese footballer
- Yoshinori Tateyama (建山 義紀, born 1975), Japanese baseball player
- Yoshinori Yamaguchi (山口 祥義; born 1965), Japanese politician
- Yoshinori Kanemoto (金本 芳典; born 2000), Korean-Japanese singer, member of South Korean band Treasure.
