= Guardian Nunatak =

Guardian Nunatak (83°49′S 173°14′E) is a rock exposure, 210 metres (700 ft) high, on the ice-covered spur that descends from Mount Robert Scott east-northeastward toward the western edge of Hood Glacier, near the juncture with Ross Ice Shelf. It is, as it were, guarding the entrance to the glacier, hence the name given by the New Zealand Alpine Club Antarctic Expedition, 1959–60.
