= USS Guardian =

USS Guardian may refer to the following ships of the United States Navy:

- USS Guardian (YAGR-1), launched as the Liberty ship SS James G. Squires in 1945; placed in reserve at the end of World War II, converted to a radar picket ship and recommissioned as USS Guardian in 1955, decommissioned in 1965, and scrapped in 1971
- Motor Torpedo Boat PT-809, a PT boat under the Potomac River Naval Command; named USS Guardian in November 1959 (official designation remained PT-809)
- USS Guardian (MCM-5), an Avenger-class mine countermeasures ship that was launched in 1987, commissioned in 1989, and grounded on a reef and decommissioned in 2013.
