= Victoria Guardia Alvarado =

Costa Rican politician and diplomat

Victoria Guardia Alvarado (born in 1939) is a Costa Rican politician and diplomat. She is the present Ambassador of Costa Rica in the FAO in Malta.

She was born in San José, Costa Rica, in 1939. She studied at universities in Mexico and at the Diplomatic School of Spain. She entered the Ministry of External Relations on June 15, 1966. She has held numerous diplomatic positions, including First Secretary of the Embassy of Costa Rica in Madrid, head of Cabinet of the Minister, assistant director of International Organizations.

She has also been professor of the diplomatic Institute of the Costa Rican Chancellery.

She is married to Manuel Antonio Hernández Gutiérrez, also an Ambassador of Costa Rica.
