= Guardia Mitre =

Coordinates: 40°26′S 63°41′W

- Municipality and village
- Country: Argentina
- Province: Río Negro Province

Government
  - Type: Mayor
  - Mayor: Angel Zingoni
- Time zone: UTC−3 (ART)
- Postal code: R8505
- Climate: BSk

Guardia Mitre is a village and municipality in the Río Negro Province of Argentina, founded in 1862. Between 1881 and 1946, it was called Coronel Pringles.
