= The Guard =

The Guard may refer to:

- The Guard (TV series), a Canadian drama series portraying about the Canadian Coast Guard
- The Guard (1990 film), a 1990 Soviet film about a soldier who kills his entire unit
- The Guard (2001 film), a 2001 experimental Indian Malayalam film about a forest guard
- The Guard (2011 film), a 2011 Irish buddy cop comedy
- The Guard (novel), a 2008 Arabic-language novel by Ezzat el Kamhawi, about a presidential guard being subsumed into the system

== See also ==
- Guard (disambiguation)
- Guardian (disambiguation)
