= HMS Guardian =

Three ships of the Royal Navy have been named HMS Guardian:

- HMS Guardian (1784) was a 44-gun fifth rate launched in 1784, and converted to a transport ship in 1789. She struck an iceberg in the Southern Ocean that year, but was successfully sailed back to Cape Town before being wrecked in a gale.
- HMS Guardian (1932) was a net-laying and photographic ship launched in 1932 and scrapped in 1962.
- HMS Guardian (P245) was a support ship bought for service in the Falkland Islands. She had originally been the civilian Seaforth Champion. She was sold in 1987.
