= Commercial Journal and Advertiser =

Defunct newspaper in Sydney, Australia

Title page of Commercial Journal and Advertiser, 6 July 1835.

The Commercial Journal and Advertiser is a defunct Australian newspaper that was published in Sydney New South Wales, from the 1830s and continued publication through to the mid 1840s, under various names in Sydney, New South Wales, Australia.

== History ==
The earliest existent copy of the paper, found in an Australian library, is no. 19, July 1835. The newspaper was published two to three times a week, and was marketed with the boast of being "The Cheapest Newspaper in the Colony". From 6 January 1841 to 30 June 1841, the paper was published as the Free Press and Commercial Journal, and began with new numbering sequence, which continued up to no. 51. From July 1841, to June 1842, the paper was published as the Sydney Free Press, and the numbering of the paper continued on from that of the Free Press and Commercial Journal, starting at no. 52. The publication of the Sydney Free Press continued until 30 June 1842. From July 1842 to April 1845, the publication of the paper was suspended. On 5 April 1845 the publication recommenced, under the name Commercial Journal, General Advertiser and Odd Fellows' Advocate, with a new numbering sequence. On April 16, 1845, the title was simplified to the Commercial Journal and General Advertiser, and was again changed to the Examiner on August 9. The Examiner is believed to have ceased publication after the 1 November 1845 issue.

The initial proprietor of the newspaper was William Jones, later operating from No. 17 Colonnade, Bridge-street, Sydney. During 1841 to 1842, while published as the Free Press and Commercial Journal and the Sydney Free Press, the proprietor was Robert S. McEachern (also M'Eachern), operating from No.5 Bridge Street, Sydney. After the recommencement of publication, the printer and publisher was again William Jones. Upon being renamed as the Examiner the newspaper was published by Richard Thompson, operating out of King Street, corner of George Street, Sydney.

| Publication | Commenced publication | Ceased publication |
|---|---|---|
| Commercial Journal and Advertiser | 1835 | 1841 (Dec.) |
| Free Press and Commercial Journal | 1841 (Jan.) | 1841 (June) |
| (suspended) | 1841 (July) | 1845 (Apr.) |
| Commercial Journal, General Advertiser and Odd Fellows' Advocate | 1845 (Apr.) | 1845 (Apr.) |
| Commercial Journal and General Advertiser | 1845 (Apr.) | 1845 (Aug.) |
| Examiner | 1845 (Aug.) | 1845 (Nov.?) |

== Gallery of front pages ==
Free Press and Commercial Journal 6 Jan 1841

Sydney Free Press 3 July 1841

Front page 5 April 1845. Commercial Journal and General Advertiser (1845)

Front page of The Examiner (1845)

== Digitisation ==
The various editions of the paper have been digitised as part of the Australian Newspapers Digitisation Program, a project hosted by the National Library of Australia.

== See also ==
- List of newspapers in New South Wales
- List of newspapers in Australia
