= Speaker's triangle =

Public speaking technique

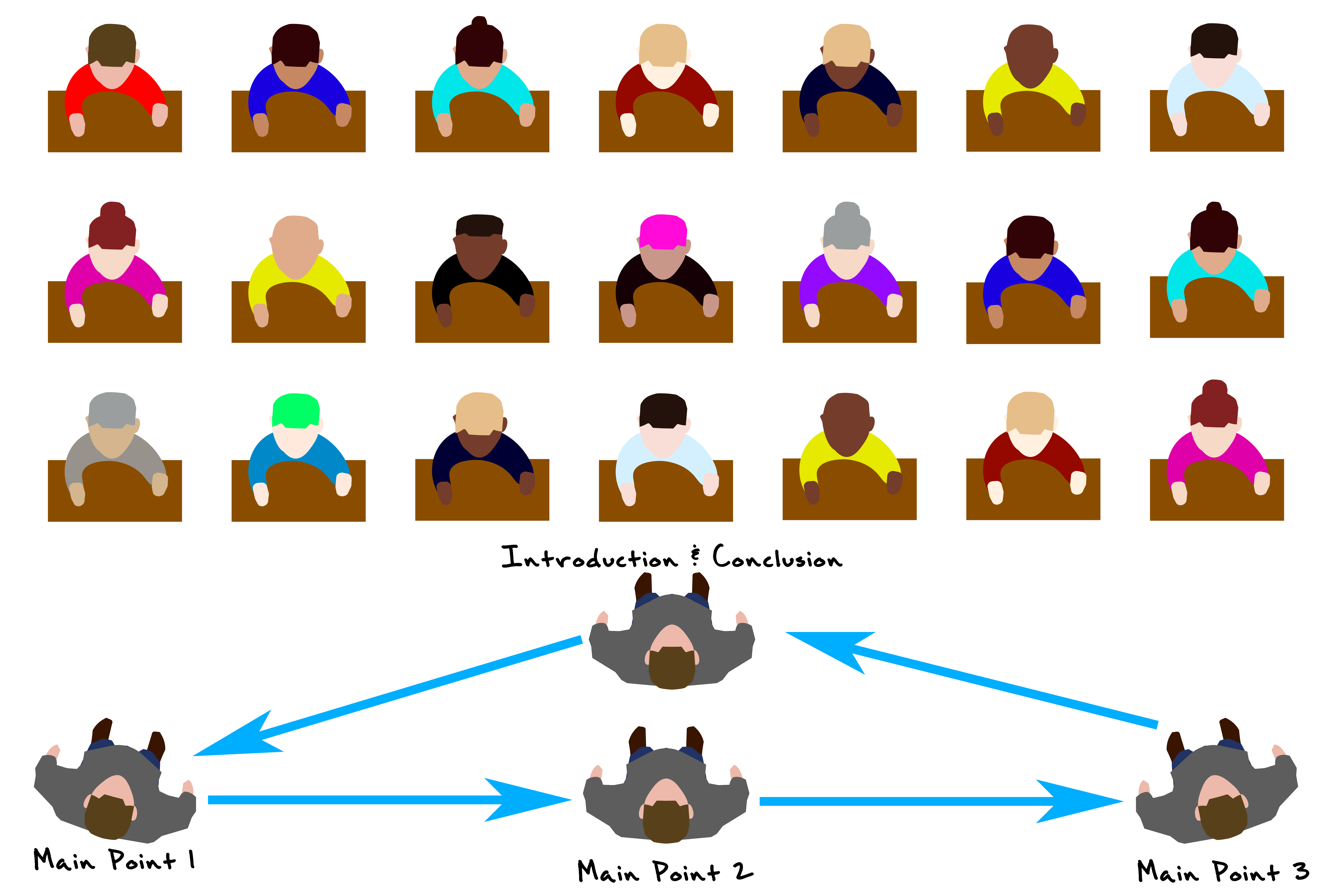
A diagram of the standard speakers triangle used in a three-point speech.

A speaker's triangle is a delivery device commonly employed in competitive and academic public speaking activities. It involves a speaker engaging in a series of transition walks, physically moving to different positions on the stage while simultaneously delivering transition statements that inform the audience about the shift to the next main point of the speech. The use of a speaker's triangle offers numerous benefits, including improved memorization, enhanced eye contact through an expanded zone of interaction, and the establishment of ethos with the audience.
