= Guarda =

Guarda may refer to:

- Guarda, Portugal, city in Portugal
- Guarda District, the district containing that city
- Roman Catholic Diocese of Guarda, Portugal, the diocese containing that city
- Guarda, Switzerland, municipality in Grisons, Switzerland
  - Guarda railway station, a Rhaetian Railway station
- Guarda Veneta, municipality in the province of Rovigo, region of Veneto, Italy
- A Guarda, municipality in the province of Pontevedra, Galicia, Spain
- Guarda-Mor, municipality in Minas Gerais, Brazil
- "Guarda", a hymn tune by Sydney Watson

== See also ==
- Garda (disambiguation)
- Guard (disambiguation)
- Guardia (disambiguation)
- Guardian (disambiguation)
- La Guardia (disambiguation)
