= Defender of the Faith (disambiguation) =

Defender of the Faith (Latin: Fidei defensor, Fidei defensatrix; French: Défenseur de la Foi) is a phrase used as part of the full style of many English and later British monarchs and other monarchs and heads of state.

Defender of the Faith or Defenders of the Faith may also refer to:

== Arts and entertainment ==
- Defenders of the Faith, a 1984 album by Judas Priest
- Defender of the Faith (play), by Stuart Carolan
- "Defender of the Faith", a short story by Philip Roth from the 1959 collection Goodbye, Columbus
- Defenders of the Faith (Dungeons & Dragons), an optional rulebook for the game

== Other uses ==
- Defenders of the Faith (Puerto Rico), a Christian denomination
- Ansar Dine (Arabic, 'defenders of the faith'), a militant Islamist group in Mali

== See also ==
- Nasir al-Din (disambiguation), Arabic for defender of the faith
