= UCSD Guardian =

Student newspaper in San Diego

The UCSD Guardian
- Front page of the May 26, 2016 issue
- Type: Student newspaper
- Format: Newspaper and online
- School: University of California, San Diego
- Owner: University of California San Diego Student Affairs
- Editor-in-chief: Camelia Tzadok
- Founded: 1967
- Headquarters: La Jolla, California
- Circulation: 10,000
- Website: ucsdguardian.org

The UCSD Guardian is a student-operated newspaper at the University of California, San Diego. Originally named the Triton Times, it is published once a week during the regular academic year, usually Mondays.

== Staff structure ==
The Guardian's editorial staff consists of UCSD undergraduates. The Editor in Chief is elected in the late spring by a vote of the current year's staff; the Editor in Chief-elect then selects new senior editors, who make up the paper's Executive Board, which is ratified by the outgoing editors.

In contrast, the paper's business side is operated by several longtime university employees. A Business Oversight Board, which includes the paper's general manager, Editor in Chief, and managing editors, is responsible for setting long-term policies for the business and overseeing their implementation.

== Recent history ==
In recent years, the paper has undergone a series of crises and resulting restructurings. Between 2001 and 2004, The Guardian saw its annual revenue plunge, from above $400,000 to less than $320,000. The resulting budget deficits nearly wiped out the paper's financial reserves and resulted in page reductions for its editorial operations.

As part of an effort to stop the bleeding, the paper's general manager implemented a strict 50-50 division between editorial content and advertising. The Executive Board of the paper responded to the crisis by carrying out a reorganization of the business department and a reduction in the compensation of its student staff.

In the 2024-25 academic year, the paper's budget was halved due to financial pressures. The university asked the paper to raise $120,000 to pay for a journalism adviser, a position the paper did not previously have. The print edition was subsequently trimmed back from weekly to biweekly. In student government elections, students will be asked to vote on a student fee that would fund the paper's operations.

== Editorial success ==
Throughout the years, The Guardian has won many local, regional, statewide, and national awards. In 2006, The Guardian won nearly a dozen and a half awards from the California College Media Association, in categories ranging from design and illustration to writing and photography. Shortly after, the paper was also named an honorable mention in the competition to be named Newspaper of the Year by the Associated Collegiate Press.

In 2020, The Guardian won several awards from the San Diego Society of Professional Journalists, including second place for Best College Newspaper, first place for Best Arts & Entertainment Story in a College Publication, and third place for Best Opinion in a College Publication. The Guardian also won several awards from the San Diego Press Club, including first place for Best Column in a College Publication, second place for Best Investigative Reporting in a College Publication, and an honorable mention for Best Student Newspaper.

While UCSD does not have a journalism program, many former Guardian writers and editors have launched journalism careers. Guardian alumni have worked or currently work for major newspapers (including The Wall Street Journal, the Orange County Register, Kansas City Star, the Seattle Post-Intelligencer, The San Diego Union-Tribune, the Riverside Press-Enterprise, The Torrance Daily Breeze, The Christian Science Monitor, Investor's Business Daily, LA Weekly, SF Weekly and the Los Angeles Times), magazines (including Newsweek, Vanity Fair, Flaunt and Macworld), and television news stations (KGTV-San Diego). In 2006, an alumnus was nominated for the Academy Award in the Documentary Short category.

== Change in frequency ==
During fall quarter 1990, The Guardian published three issues a week, on Mondays, Wednesdays, and Fridays. Due to a lack of advertising revenue and the increased production and distribution costs of a third issue of the newspaper, the paper reverted to a twice-weekly schedule during winter quarter 1991. The Guardian was published twice weekly, on Mondays and Thursdays, until winter quarter 2017, when the switch to a weekly schedule was made.

At the beginning of spring quarter 2020, The Guardian temporarily ceased its print publication and made the transition to release all content on its website and in a weekly newsletter. This change was made due to the ongoing COVID-19 pandemic. The Guardian returned to print at the beginning of the Fall quarter in 2021-22.

== The Disreguardian ==
In the early 1980s The Guardian published several April Fool's Day issues, titled The Disreguardian. The practice stopped at some point, but was revived on April 1, 1990, a decision that resulted in Editor-in-Chief Seth Slater's resignation in protest. The April Fool's issues continue to this day.
