= The Guardians (Abbey novel) =

The Guardians is a novel by Lynn Abbey published in 1982.

== Plot summary ==
The Guardians is a novel in which in tears in the fabric of time and space open rifts in New York and Britain.

== Reception ==
Greg Costikyan reviewed The Guardians in Ares Magazine #14 and commented that "The Guardians is a book which both mainstream and science fiction readers will be comfortable with. The plot hangs together well, the character are well-realized, and Abbey manages to transmit a sense of the horror of the situation without recourse to violence or nausea."

== Reviews ==
- Harvest 1983-05: Vol 3 Iss 5
