= The Guardian (sculpture) =

Artwork in Redwood City, California

Coordinates: 37.4931°N 122.2204°W

- Artist: Ante Buljan
- Year: 1995
- Type: Sculpture
- Medium: Bronze and granite
- Dimensions: 3.7 m (12 ft)
- Location: Redwood City, California

The Guardian is a public artwork by artist Ante Buljan, located at the front of the Redwood City Police Station, in Redwood City, California, United States.

== Description ==
The artwork is a 12-foot (3.7 m) bronze and granite sculpture, commissioned by Redwood City for the entrance to its police department complex. It was commissioned by the Redwood City Civic Cultural Commission in 1995 as part of new development for the Redwood City Police Station. It is located at the entrance to the police station, at 1301 Maple Street, Redwood City, CA 94063-2766

The artist, Ante Buljan, was born in Croatia and moved to California at the age of nine. He is a graduate of UCLA (psychology), and also studied at John F. Kennedy University in Orinda, California. For several years, he maintained a working studio in the 1870 Art Center in Belmont, California.
