= Defender =

Defender(s) or The Defender(s) may refer to:

== Arts and entertainment ==
=== Film, television, and theatre ===
==== Film ====
- The Defender (1989 film), a Canadian documentary
- The Defender (1994 film), or The Bodyguard from Beijing
- The Defender (2004 film), a British-German action film
- The Defenders (2023 film), an Australian documentary about Bahraini dissenter and footballer Hakeem al-Araibi

==== Television ====
- The Defender (2021 TV series), a Czech crime drama series
- The Defenders (1961 TV series), an American courtroom drama
- The Defenders (2010 TV series), an American legal comedy-drama
- The Defenders (miniseries), an American Marvel TV series
  - The Defenders Saga, a term used to describe the interconnected set of Marvel Netflix television series
- "Defender" (FBI: Most Wanted), a 2020 episode
- "The Defenders" (The Defenders episode)
- "The Defender" (Studio One), a 1957 episode

==== Theatre ====
- The Defenders (ballet), a 2007 ballet by William Forsythe
- The Defender (musical), 1902 Broadway musical

=== Gaming ===
- Defender (card player), a player who plays against the declarer
- Defender (1981 video game)
- Defender (2002 video game), a remake
- Defender, a 1982 pinball table based on the 1981 video game.

=== Literature ===
- The Chicago Defender, a Chicago-based online newspaper
- Defender, a 2001 novel in C. J. Cherryh's Foreigner series
- The Defender (Kalashnikoff novel), a 1951 novel by Nicholas Kalashnikoff
- The Defender (Thwaites novel), a 1936 novel by F. J. Thwaites
- Defenders (comics), a fictional superhero group in Marvel comic books
- "The Defenders" (short story), a 1953 short story by Philip K. Dick

=== Music ===
- Defender (album), a 1987 album by Rory Gallagher
- "Defender" (Gabriella Cilmi song), 2010
- "Defender" (Peter Andre song), 2010
- "The Defender", a 1982 song by Buckner & Garcia from Pac-Man Fever
- "Defender", a 1987 song by Manowar from Fighting the World
- "Defender", a 2000 song by Heavenly from Coming from the Sky
- "Defender", a 2012 song by As I Lay Dying from Awakened
- "Defender", a 2018 song by Wolfheart from Constellation of the Black Light
- "Defender", a 2020 song by August Burns Red from Guardians
- "Defenders", a 2014 song by DragonForce from Maximum Overload

== Sports ==
- A member of the defense (sports)
  - Defender (association football)
- Defender (America's Cup), the America's Cup yacht representing the club that currently holds the Cup
- Defender (1895 yacht), the 1895 America's Cup winner
- Defender (1982 yacht), a yacht which competed in the 1983 America's Cup
- Connecticut Defenders, a former American baseball team
- Los Angeles D-Fenders, now the South Bay Lakers, an American basketball team
- Defenders Football Club, formerly Sri Lanka Army SC
- Defenceman, ice hockey position

== Military ==
=== Aircraft ===
- Britten-Norman Defender, a multi-role utility transport aircraft
- Fletcher FD-25 Defender, a 1950s American light ground-attack aircraft
- McDonnell Douglas MD 500 Defender, a light military helicopter

=== Naval and Coast Guard vessels ===
- HMS Defender, the name of several ships of the Royal Navy
- USS Defender (MCM-2), a mine countermeasures ship of the U.S. Navy
- Defender-class boat, a class of boat of the U.S. Coast Guard
- Defender-class torpedo boat (1883)

== Transportation ==
- Land Rover Defender, a British 4×4 off-road vehicle
  - Land Rover Defender (L663), from 2019

== Other uses ==
- Defendant or defender in Scots law for civil cases
- Defender Limited, a British Virgin Islands investment fund
- Defender Mountain, on the border of the provinces of British Columbia and Alberta in Canada
- Defenders (Ireland), a Roman Catholic agrarian secret society in 18th century Ireland
- Windows Defender, anti-malware software

== See also ==
- Defender of the Faith (disambiguation)
- Defendor, a 2009 Canadian-American film
- Public defender, a lawyer appointed to represent people who cannot afford to hire a lawyer
