= South Wales Guardian =

Newspaper serving Carmarthenshire, Wales

- Type: Weekly newspaper
- Owner: Newsquest
- Headquarters: Ammanford, Carmarthenshire
- Circulation: 1,513 (as of 2023)
- Website: southwalesguardian.co.uk

The South Wales Guardian is a newspaper serving Ammanford and the surrounding area of Carmarthenshire, Wales.
