= Jodorowsky (surname) =

Jodorowsky / Jodorowski is a spelling variation of Polish language surname Chodorowski. Surname is derived from Polish name Chodorów of Galician city Khodoriv.

It may refer to:

- Adán Jodorowsky (born 1979), French-Mexican musician, actor, and director; son of Alejandro
- Alejandro Jodorowsky (born 1929), Chilean-French avant-garde filmmaker, playwright, and comic book writer
- Alma Jodorowsky (born 1991), French actress, fashion model, and singer; granddaughter of Alejandro, daughter of Brontis
- Axel Jodorowsky, a.k.a. Cristóbal Jodorowsky (1965–2022), Mexican-French actor, playwright, painter, and tarologist; son of Alejandro
- Brontis Jodorowsky (born 1962), Mexican-French actor and theatre director; son of Alejandro, father of Alma

== See also ==
- Chodorow
