= Abel Cain =

- Directed by: Alejandro Jodorowsky
- Written by: Alejandro Jodorowsky
- Produced by: Parallel Media
- Starring: Axel Jodorowsky
- Cinematography: Vilmos Zsigmond
- Music by: Adán Jodorowsky
- Countries: United States; Spain; Russia
- Languages: Spanish; English

Abel Cain (alternatively known as Abelcaín), also known as Sons of El Topo or The Son of El Topo, is a stalled film project written and directed by Alejandro Jodorowsky and the sequel to Jodorowsky's classic acid Western film El Topo (1970). It was to be produced and financed by Parallel Media. The original working-title, The Sons of El Topo (Los hijos del Topo), was changed sometime between 1996 and 2002 to Abel Cain. In a 2010 interview, Jodorowsky said that the film had "dragged a long time" and suggested that Abel Cain will not feature any "stars", adding that he would cast his son Axel Jodorowsky in the lead role just as he did in his 1989 cult classic film Santa Sangre.

It was expected to be released sometime between late 2011 to 2012, but appears to be shelved so that he may shoot his biopic, The Dance of Reality, first.

During an interview at the Cannes Film Festival in 2016, Jodorowsky announced his plans to finally make The Son of El Topo as soon as financial backing is obtained. Also in 2016 the sequel to El Topo was released in comic book form as Sons of El Topo (the original title for the project), in a miniseries written by Jodorowsky and illustrated by José Ladrönn. Its third and final volume released in 2022. Axel Jodorowsky died in 2022.

== Synopsis ==
After a nuclear apocalypse, the whole landscape is a desert ruin, except for a small island paradise where El Topo is buried. Though visible and seemingly accessible, every attempt to enter this island has resulted in disaster. El Topo's sons, Cain and Abel, were separated as boys because El Topo predicted that Cain would kill Abel. But when evil marauders steal their mother's body in an attempt to trick their way into the island, the brothers join forces to deliver their dead mother to be buried with their father. Not only must they overcome an enemy adept at technological witchery, they must overcome the curse that marks their destiny.

== Production ==
Alejandro Jodorowsky began attempting to resurrect his film career in the mid-nineties after becoming disillusioned with the business during his poor experience on The Rainbow Thief and attempted to market a sequel to his classic El Topo, and created a teaser poster. Originally Sons of El Topo was to star Marilyn Manson and Johnny Depp, but the funding never materialized and Jodorowsky shortly abandoned the project.

Jodorowsky next attempted to make a "metaphysical gangster film" entitled King Shot, which was to be produced by David Lynch and star Marilyn Manson and Nick Nolte. He drew numerous conceptual sketches and heavily marketed the film to producers, but eventually he and Lynch abandoned the project after they were only able to acquire a portion of the budget necessary to shoot the film and Jodorowsky was given another opportunity to make his "dream project".

In a November 2009 interview with The Guardian, Jodorowsky revealed that he had stopped trying to make King Shot, but had finally been given financing for the sequel to El Topo by some "Russian producers" who own Parallel Media films.
