= The Holy Mountain (1973 film) =

1973 film by Alejandro Jodorowsky

- Theatrical release poster
- Directed by: Alejandro Jodorowsky
- Written by: Alejandro Jodorowsky
- Produced by: Alejandro Jodorowsky; Roberto Viskin
- Starring: Alejandro Jodorowsky; Horacio Salinas; Zamira Saunders
- Cinematography: Rafael Corkidi
- Edited by: Alejandro Jodorowsky; Federico Landeros
- Music by: Don Cherry; Ronald Frangipane; Alejandro Jodorowsky
- Production companies: ABKCO Films; Producciones Zohar
- Distributed by: ABKCO Films
- Release dates: May 1973 (Cannes); 27 November 1973 (United States)
- Running time: 114 minutes
- Country: Mexico
- Languages: English; Spanish
- Budget: $750,000
- Box office: $104,160 (reissue)

The Holy Mountain (Spanish: La montaña sagrada) is a 1973 Mexican avant-garde surrealist film directed, written, produced, co-scored, co-edited by and starring Alejandro Jodorowsky, who also participated as a set designer and costume designer on the film. Following Jodorowsky's underground hit El Topo (1970), acclaimed by both John Lennon and George Harrison, the film was produced by the Beatles manager Allen Klein of ABKCO Music and Records. John Lennon and Yoko Ono put up production money. It received positive reviews from critics and was shown at various international film festivals in 1973, including Cannes, and limited screenings in New York and San Francisco.

== Plot ==
A man (later identified as the thief), representing The Fool tarot card, lies in the desert with flies covering his face. He is befriended by a footless, handless dwarf representing the Five of Swords, and the pair travel into the city where they make money entertaining tourists. Because the thief resembles Jesus Christ in appearance, some locals—a nun and three warriors—cast an impression of his body and sell the resulting crucifixes. After a dispute with a priest, the thief eats off the face of his wax statue and sends it skyward with balloons, symbolically eating the body of Christ and offering "himself" up to Heaven. Soon after, he notices a crowd gathered around a tall tower, where a large hook with a bag of gold has been sent down in exchange for food.

The thief, wishing to find the source of the gold, ascends the tower. There he finds the alchemist and his silent assistant. After a confrontation with the alchemist, the thief defecates into a container. The excrement is transformed into gold by the alchemist, who proclaims: "You are excrement. You can change yourself into gold." The thief accepts the gold, but smashes a mirror with the gold when shown his reflection. The alchemist then takes the thief as an apprentice.

The thief is introduced to seven people who will accompany him on his journey. Each is introduced as a personification of one of the planets, in particular the negative characteristics that are associated with the respective planet. They consist of Fon (Venus), a cosmetician who produces artificial faces; Isla (Mars), a weapons manufacturer; Klen (Jupiter), a millionaire art dealer specializing in erotic machines; Sel (Saturn), a toy maker who uses her products to indoctrinate children; Berg (Uranus), a political advisor who favors reducing the population for financial purposes; Axon (Neptune), a police chief who castrates his officers; and Lut (Pluto), an architect of minimalist homes. The alchemist instructs the seven to burn their money as well as wax effigies of themselves. Together with the alchemist, the thief, and the alchemist's assistant, they form a group of ten.

The characters are led by the alchemist through various transformation rituals. The ten journey by boat to "Lotus Island" in order to gain the secret of immortality from nine immortal masters who live on a holy mountain. Once on Lotus Island they are sidetracked by the Pantheon Bar, a cemetery party where people have abandoned their quest for the holy mountain and instead engage in drugs, poetry, or acts of physical prowess. Leaving the bar behind, they ascend the mountain. Each has a personal symbolic vision representing their worst fears and obsessions.

Near the top, the thief is sent back to his "people" along with a young prostitute and a chimpanzee who have followed him from the city to the mountain. The rest confront the cloaked immortals, who are shown to be only faceless dummies. The alchemist then breaks the fourth wall with the command "Zoom back, camera!" and reveals the film apparatus (cameras, microphones, lights, and crew) just outside the frame. He instructs everyone, including the audience of the film, to leave the holy mountain: "Goodbye to the Holy Mountain. Real life awaits us."

== Cast ==
- Alejandro Jodorowsky as The Alchemist
- Horacio Salinas as The Thief
- Ramona Saunders as The Written Woman
- Juan Ferrara as Fon (Venus)
- Adriana Page as Isla (Mars)
- Burt Kleiner as Klen (Jupiter)
- Valerie Jodorowsky as Sel (Saturn)
- Nicky Nichols as Berg (Uranus)
- Richard Rutowsky as Axon (Neptune)
- Luis Lomelí as Lut (Pluto)
- Ana de Sade as The Prostitute
- David Silva as Fon's Father
- Basilio González as The Crippled Man
- Lupita Peruyero as Berg's Wife
- Héctor Ortega as Drug's Master
- Connie de la Mora as Bald Woman
- Leticia Robles as Bald Woman
- Blanca Sánchez as Woman with Mirror
- Chucho-Chucho as The Chimpanzee
- Bobby Cameron as Fon's Working Girl

== Production ==
=== Inspiration ===
The film is based on Ascent of Mount Carmel by John of the Cross and Mount Analogue by René Daumal, who was a student of George Gurdjieff. In this film, much of Jodorowsky's visually psychedelic story follows the metaphysical thrust of Mount Analogue. This is revealed in such events as the climb to the alchemist, the assembly of individuals with specific skills, the discovery of the mountain that unites Heaven and Earth "that cannot not exist", and symbolic challenges along the mountain ascent. Daumal died before finishing his allegorical novel, and Jodorowsky's improvised ending provides a way of completing the work (both symbolically and otherwise).

=== Preparation ===
Before the principal photography started, Jodorowsky and his wife spent a week without sleep under the direction of a Japanese Zen master.

The central members of the cast spent three months doing various spiritual exercises guided by Oscar Ichazo of the Arica Institute. The Arica training features Zen, Sufi and yoga exercises along with eclectic concepts drawn from the Kabbalah, the I Ching and the teachings of George Gurdjieff. After the training, the group lived for one month communally in Jodorowsky's home before production. Thereafter, the filming started in early 1972. The film was shot sequentially, entirely in Mexico, at a budget of $750,000.

Jodorowsky was also instructed by Ichazo to take LSD for the purpose of spiritual exploration. He also administered psilocybin mushrooms to the actors during the shooting of the death-rebirth scene.

== Release ==
The Holy Mountain was completed just in time for the 1973 Cannes Film Festival, where it was much awaited. Jodorowsky edited out twenty minutes of dialogue from the film, with the intention of removing as much dialogue as he could. The film had its premiere at Waverly Theatre, an art house movie theater in New York City on 29 November 1973, where it had restricted run at midnights on Friday and Saturday for sixteen months. It was also shown at Filmex on 30 March 1974, which was described as the "American premiere". At a few places it was released as a double bill with Jodorowsky's 1970 film, El Topo, and eventually became a cult film with its influence on popular culture.

The DVD's extra segment includes a deleted scene in which we see two children; a young Brontis Jodorowsky and a naked girl, watching a cross made from television sets. In his commentary, Jodorowsky explains how the scene was deleted because the girl's mother threatened to sue for potential pedophilia because of the young girl's nudity.

== Home media ==
The film was not given a wide release until over 30 years following its original premiere, except for two heavily censored Japanese LaserDisc releases. A restored print was shown in Cannes on 23 May 2006. It toured the United States, screening with El Topo. It was released in DVD format on 1 May 2007, and a Blu-ray was released on 26 April 2011.

== Reception ==
On review aggregator Rotten Tomatoes, The Holy Mountain holds an approval rating of 85%, based on 26 reviews, and an average rating of 7.3/10. Its consensus reads, "A visual treat rich in symbolism, The Holy Mountain adds another defiantly idiosyncratic chapter to Jodorowsky's thoroughly unique filmography." Metacritic, which uses a weighted average, assigned the film a score of 76 out of 100, based on 11 critics, indicating "generally favorable" reviews.
