= Night Visions (film festival) =

Biannual film festival in Finland

- Location: Helsinki, Finland
- Founded: 1997
- Awards received: Helsinki Cultural Achievement Award (2012)
- Awards: Night Visions Audience Award
- Hosted by: Night Visions - Yön Kuvat Ry
- Festival date: Back to Basics: April; Maximum Halloween: October
- Language: International
- Website: www.nightvisions.info

Night Visions is a biannual film festival focusing on horror, fantasy, science fiction and cult cinema. The festival is held twice a year in Helsinki, Finland. The festival also showcases documentaries and short films. The first Night Visions festival was organized in November 1997.

== History ==
The first Night Visions festival was organized in Halloween 1997. The roots of the festival lay in Gorehound, a film zine focusing on genre cinema, whose readership and staff were responsible for the first Night Visions Film Festival. The current festival director Mikko Aromaa is former editor-in-chief of Gorehound. The first festival was a one night event of an overnight screening of genre films showed back to back on one screen.

From 2002 onwards, Night Visions film festival has been arranged twice a year, with Back to Basics in mid-April and Maximum Halloween on Halloween weekend. The Maximum Halloween event was extended from one night event to a weekend event in 2005, showing movies on three different nights.

In January 2013, the film festival was awarded the Cultural Achievement Award 2012 from the City of Helsinki. The festival was credited for its bold, original and first-rate program, along with its unique atmosphere in overnight movie marathons. The judges also added that many of the films would never be seen in Finland without the festival. The winner was chosen by the Helsinki Board of Culture from nearly thousand nominees.

The 2014 film festival set a new record in attendance when Night Visions reported 8963 total attendees in Maximum Halloween event screenings and other organized events. With 5827 admissions in the same year's Back to Basics event, and the one-off Night Visions ShockPoint, a gonzo documentary special, the film festival drew a total audience of 14,790 in 2014.

== Program ==
=== Back to Basics ===
Back to Basics is currently a four night event, climaxing in a marathon event that lasts from evening until early morning, usually screening films on two different screens. Films are played back to back with short intermissions in between. Back to Basics focuses on genre classics, showing older movies and underground cult films, with occasional stabs at mainstream and newer genre pieces. Back to Basics has featured movies such as Reefer Madness, The Story of Joanna, The Fountain, The Candy Snatchers, The Last House on the Left, Joysticks, Detroit 9000, The Room, Five Element Ninjas, The Toxic Avenger and more.

=== Maximum Halloween ===
Maximum Halloween is organized usually as close to Halloween as possible, screening films on multiple screens and theaters. The event focuses on newer genre films and has acted as a premiere venue for many films in Finland. Maximum Halloween also usually screens a selection of old classics and documentaries. The 2014 Maximum Halloween screened 45 feature length films and documentaries in three different theaters, along with a selection of short films during the five-day event. The event has featured films such as Saw, The Descent, Reeker, Near Dark, Tokyo Gore Police, The Forbidden Door, The Disappearance of Alice Creed, Profondo Rosso, Shogun Assassin and many more over the years.

=== Themes and guests ===
Night Visions has had a varied line-up of guest film-makers and actors during its run. The guests are sometimes associated with the themes of the festival; such as Christopher Lee and the Hammer Film Productions theme of the 2002 festival or Lloyd Kaufman of Troma Entertainment fame in the 2014 festival. Other special guests have included Dario Argento, Paul Verhoeven, John McNaughton, John Waters and Udo Kier, among others.

=== Other events ===
In 2014, Night Visions organized an industry afternoon, in collaboration with Nordic Genre Invasion, that featured many upcoming Nordic filmmakers as well as industry veterans. The afternoon consisted of movie screenings and panel discussion.

== Awards ==
The Night Visions Audience Award has been awarded since 2008 to promote the recognition of genre cinema in Finland and in other nordic countries. All movies released in the same year, or the year before, the festival is held are eligible. The winner is decided by the audience in a ballot organized at the Maximum Halloween screenings.

The 2013 winner, Frank Pavich's documentary film Jodorowsky's Dune, was the first non-fiction film to win the award.

Night Visions Audience Award winners
Year	Title	Director
2015	Spandex Sapiens	Oskari Pastila
2014	What We Do in the Shadows	Taika Waititi & Jemaine Clement
2013	Jodorowsky's Dune	Frank Pavich
2012	Dredd	Pete Travis
2011	The Woman	Lucky McKee
2010	Machete	Robert Rodriguez & Ethan Maniquis
2009	Dead Snow	Tommy Wirkola
2008	Eden Lake	James Watkins

== See also ==
- List of fantastic and horror film festivals
