= Endless Poetry =

2016 French-Chilean film by Alejandro Jodorowsky

- Film poster
- Directed by: Alejandro Jodorowsky
- Written by: Alejandro Jodorowsky
- Produced by: Xavier Guerrero
- Starring: Brontis Jodorowsky; Adán Jodorowsky; Pamela Flores; Leandro Taub
- Cinematography: Christopher Doyle
- Edited by: Maryline Monthieux
- Music by: Adán Jodorowsky
- Release date: 14 May 2016 (Cannes)
- Running time: 128 minutes
- Countries: Chile; France
- Language: Spanish

Endless Poetry (Spanish: Poesía Sin Fin) is a 2016 French-Chilean surrealist psychological autobiographical drama film directed by Alejandro Jodorowsky. It is a sequel and the second part of Jodorowsky's film autobiography, which began with The Dance of Reality (2013), which focused on Jodorowsky's childhood in Tocopilla (northern Chile). Endless Poetry, in turn, depicts the adolescence and youth of Jodorowsky in the bohemian Matucana neighborhood of Santiago, in the late 1940s and early 1950s. It was screened in the Directors' Fortnight section at the 2016 Cannes Film Festival.

== Plot ==
Alejandro Jodorowsky, now living in Santiago, Chile and working at his father's store, rejects the pressuring of his Jewish family to enter medical school and instead pursues a career as a poet. Through his creation of puppets he makes contact with a man who gives him a studio as his first residence. In this new life he encounters artists, poets and performers both notable and amateur, among them Nicanor Parra, whom he insults during a misunderstanding about Stella Díaz Varín, the woman who inspired his poem "The Viper".

His best friend and fellow poet Enrique Lihn has a fight with his girlfriend, whom Alejandro saves from committing suicide. They have sex and she becomes pregnant. An elderly man who used to work in a circus with Alejandro's father Jaime encourages Alejandro to return to the circus, which he does as a means to laugh away his troubles. Enrique and Alejandro later reconcile.

Alejandro's parents notify him that their home has burned down along with all of his writings and childhood possessions. He visits his home to say goodbye to his childhood and contemplate what he wishes to be. He visits Parra, who is teaching mathematics at an engineering school, to ask him for fatherly advice about his future. Parra urges him not to pursue a career as a poet but Alejandro ignores him and refuses to compromise.

When a strong pro-Ibáñez sentiment arises in Chile during his second period in office Alejandro decides to leave for Paris to "save surrealism." His father catches him at the dock before he leaves and attempts to drag him back into working at the store with him by force. Alejandro overpowers him and departs, never to see his father again.

== Cast ==
- Adán Jodorowsky as Alejandro (teenager)
- Jeremias Herskovits as Alejandro (boy)
- Alejandro Jodorowsky as himself
- Brontis Jodorowsky as Jaime
- Pamela Flores as Sara and Stella Díaz Varín
- Leandro Taub as Enrique Lihn
- Julia Avendaño as Pequeñita
- Felipe Ríos as Nicanor Parra
- Carolyn Carlson as Maria Lefevre
- Felipe Peña as Gustavo Becerra-Schmidt
- Bastián Bodenhöfer as Carlos Ibáñez del Campo

== Reception ==
On review aggregator website Rotten Tomatoes, the film holds an approval rating of 94%, based on 52 reviews, and an average rating of 7.3/10. The website's critical consensus reads, "Endless Poetry extends writer-director Alejandro Jodorowsky's singular filmography with another joyously surreal, visually vibrant viewing experience." On Metacritic, the film has a weighted average score of 78 out of 100, based on 19 critics, indicating "generally favorable reviews". Owen Gleiberman from Variety wrote: "Alejandro Jodorowsky's Endless Poetry is the most accessible movie he has ever made, and it may also be the best. It's Felliniesque and moving." A. O. Scott from The New York Times wrote: "Realism is not on the agenda, but Mr. Jodorowsky nonetheless evokes the chaotic, passionate spirit of a time and offers astute insights into his own psychology."

About the cinematography, Justin Chang from the Los Angeles Times wrote: "Dynamically staged and ravishingly shot by the superb cinematographer Christopher Doyle, best known for his work with Wong Kar-wai."

== Bibliography ==
- Kastrenakes, Jacob (16 February 2015). "The filmmaker whose crazy vision of Dune was never made just launched a Kickstarter". The Verge.
- Ramachandran, Naman (7 August 2020). "Cult Filmmaker Alejandro Jodorowsky Faces Unpaid $200,000 Loan From 2016 Film 'Endless Poetry' (EXCLUSIVE)". Variety.
- Salas, Camilo (17 March 2015). "A Hundred Years Is Nothing: The VICE Interview with Alejandro Jodorowsky". Vice.
