= Jodorowsky's Dune =

2013 documentary by Frank Pavich

- Theatrical release poster
- Directed by: Frank Pavich
- Produced by: Donald Rosenfeld; Frank Pavich; Stephen Scarlata; Travis Stevens
- Starring: Alejandro Jodorowsky; Michel Seydoux; H. R. Giger; Chris Foss; Nicolas Winding Refn; Devin Faraci; Amanda Lear; Richard Stanley
- Cinematography: David Cavallo
- Edited by: Paul Docherty; Alex Ricciardi
- Music by: Kurt Stenzel
- Production companies: City Film; Snowfort Pictures
- Distributed by: Sony Pictures Classics
- Release dates: May 18, 2013 (Cannes); March 21, 2014
- Running time: 90 minutes
- Countries: United States; France
- Languages: English; Spanish; French; German
- Box office: $647,280

Jodorowsky's Dune is a 2013 American-French documentary film directed by Frank Pavich. The film explores cult film director Alejandro Jodorowsky's unsuccessful attempt to adapt and film Frank Herbert's 1965 science fiction novel Dune in the mid-1970s.

== Background ==
In 1972, the production company Apjac International (APJ) headed by film producer Arthur P. Jacobs optioned the rights to film Dune. However, Jacobs died in 1973 before a film could be developed.

In December 1974, a French consortium led by Jean-Paul Gibon purchased the film rights from APJ, with director Alejandro Jodorowsky set to direct. Along with French producer Michel Seydoux, Jodorowsky proceeded to approach, among others, Virgin Records and prog rock groups Tangerine Dream, Gong and Mike Oldfield before settling on Pink Floyd and Magma to record the soundtrack; artists H. R. Giger, Chris Foss and Jean Giraud for set and character design; Dan O'Bannon for special effects; and Salvador Dalí, Orson Welles, Gloria Swanson, David Carradine, Mick Jagger, Udo Kier, Amanda Lear and others for the cast. Jodorowsky intended for his son Brontis, 12 years old at the start of pre-production, to star as Paul Atreides.

Herbert traveled to Europe in 1976 to find that $2 million of the $9.5 million budget had already been spent just on pre-production expenses and that Jodorowsky's script would result in a 14-hour film ("It was the size of a phone book", Herbert later recalled). Jodorowsky took creative liberties with the source material, but Herbert said that he and Jodorowsky had an amicable relationship. After two and a half years in development, the project ultimately stalled for financial reasons since $5 million was still needed to round out the $15-million total budget and attempts to raise more funds from investors failed.

In 1976, the film rights were purchased from the French consortium by Italian producer Dino De Laurentiis, who eventually released the 1984 film Dune, directed by David Lynch.

In January 2023, Pavich published an essay in The New York Times about Jodorowsky's Dune that discussed the issues of artificial intelligence art illustrations.

Only 20 copies of the large film-book (30×22×9 cm) were produced with just a handful of copies known to remain. At an auction in 2021 at Christie's in Paris, one of the film-books sold for a world-record price for a storyboard of 2.660.000 €.

== Content ==
French artist Jean "Moebius" Giraud worked with Jodorowsky to create a storyboard composed of 3,000 drawings that depicted the entire film.

Salvador Dalí was set to play the Emperor and claimed he wanted to be the highest-paid actor in Hollywood history. He asked for $100,000 per hour to act in the movie. Jodorowsky accepted, but then reduced the Emperor’s scenes so that Dalí would be needed for no more than one hour with the rest of his lines spoken by a robotic lookalike. Dalí accepted on condition that the plastic lookalike was donated to his museum, and that his throne was to be a toilet made up of two intersected dolphins.

Jodorowsky's refusal to compromise on Dune's running time was one main reason the film did not get made. Hollywood did not want the film's length to exceed two hours. Jodorowsky felt 10 to 14 hours would be more appropriate for the adaptation.

The film notes that Jodorowsky's script, extensive storyboards, and concept art were sent to all major film studios, and argues that these influenced and inspired later film productions, including Star Wars, the Alien series, Flash Gordon, the Terminator series, and The Fifth Element. In particular, the Jodorowsky-assembled team of O'Bannon, Foss, Giger, and Giraud went on to collaborate on the 1979 film Alien.

"It was a great undertaking to do the script," Jodorowsky says in the film. Speaking of Herbert's novel, he says: "It's very, it's like Proust, I compare it to great literature."

The documentary concludes that Jodorowsky's efforts did not go to waste, and that he and Giraud recycled much of their concepts for The Incal, a series of graphic novels they began publishing in 1980.

== Production ==
The project was officially announced in May 2011. Director Pavich filmed an extensive series of interviews with the principal players involved in the failed 1970s adaptation, shooting in France, Switzerland, the United Kingdom, and the United States.

== Release ==
Jodorowsky's Dune premiered at the Director's Fortnight at the 2013 Cannes Film Festival in May 2013. Sony Pictures Classics acquired the North American distribution rights to the film in July 2013, and later announced a theatrical release date of March 7, 2014. The film was released on DVD and on-demand on July 8, 2014.

== Reception ==
The film has received critical acclaim. Variety called it a "mind-blowing cult movie" and said that director Pavich "happens upon a compelling theory: that even in its still-born form, the film manifested the sort of collective [consciousness] that Jodorowsky was trying to peddle through its plot, trickling down to influence other sci-fi films that followed". The Hollywood Reporter declared the "entertaining documentary makes the case for this overblown epic as a legendary lost masterpiece". Entertainment Weekly named Jodorowsky's Dune as one of its 10 Best Movies of 2014.

Review aggregation website Rotten Tomatoes gave Jodorowsky's Dune a 98% approval rating based on reviews from 121 critics, with an average rating of 8/10. The site's consensus states: "Part thoughtful tribute, part bittersweet reminder of a missed opportunity, Jodorowsky's Dune offers a fascinating look at a lost sci-fi legend." Metacritic, which uses a weighted average, assigned the film a score of 79 out of 100, based on 31 critics, indicating "generally favorable" reviews.

=== Accolades ===
List of awards and nominations for Jodorowsky's Dune
Award	Date of ceremony	Category	Recipients	Result
Australian Film Critics Association	February 9, 2015	Best Documentary	Jodorowsky’s Dune	Won
Boston Society of Film Critics	December 7, 2014	Best Documentary	Jodorowsky’s Dune	Runner Up
Chicago Film Critics Association	December 7, 2014	Best Documentary	Jodorowsky’s Dune	Nominated
Cinema Eye Honors	January 8, 2014	Audience Choice	Jodorowsky’s Dune	Nominated
Cinema Eye Honors	January 8, 2014	Outstanding Achievement in Graphic Design or Animation	Syd Garon	Won
20th Critics' Choice Awards	January 15, 2015	Best Documentary	Jodorowsky’s Dune	Nominated
Detroit Film Critics Society	December 15, 2014	Best Documentary	Jodorowsky’s Dune	Nominated
Fantastic Fest	September 24, 2013	Best Documentary	Jodorowsky’s Dune	Won
Fantastic Fest	September 24, 2013	Audience Award	Jodorowsky’s Dune	Won
Florida Film Critics Circle	December 19, 2014	Best Documentary Feature	Jodorowsky’s Dune	Nominated
Houston Film Critics Society	January 10, 2015	Best Documentary Feature	Jodorowsky’s Dune	Nominated
Imagine Film Festival	April 19, 2014	Syfy Silver Scream Audience Award	Jodorowsky’s Dune	Won
National Board of Review	January 10, 2015	Top 5 Documentaries	Jodorowsky’s Dune	Won
Night Visions Film Festival	November 6, 2013	Audience Award	Jodorowsky's Dune	Won
Satellite Awards	February 15, 2015	Best Documentary Film	Jodorowsky’s Dune	Nominated
San Francisco Film Critics Circle	December 14, 2014	Best Documentary	Jodorowsky’s Dune	Nominated
Sitges Film Festival	October 19, 2013	Audience Award	Jodorowsky’s Dune	Won
Sitges Film Festival	October 19, 2013	Special Jury Prize	Jodorowsky’s Dune	Special Mention
Utopiales	November 6, 2013	Grand Prix	Jodorowsky’s Dune	Won
Utopiales	November 6, 2013	Grand Prix du Public	Jodorowsky’s Dune	Won
Washington D.C. Area Film Critics Association	December 8, 2014	Best Documentary	Jodorowsky’s Dune	Nominated

=== Top-ten lists ===
The film appeared on several critics' year-end lists.

- 2nd – Alex Biese, Asbury Park Press
- 2nd – Wired Staff, Wired
- 3rd – Liam Lacey, The Globe and Mail
- 5th – Neil Rosen, NY1
- 5th – Mike Gencarelli, MediaMikes.com
- 5th – Most Underrated – Angry Nerd, Wired
- 6th – Richard Corliss, Time
- 6th – TT Stern-Enzi, Cincinnati City Beat
- 7th – Giovanni Fazio, The Japan Times
- 7th – Steve Persall, Tampa Bay Times
- 8th – Jeffrey M. Anderson, The San Francisco Examiner
- 10th – Chris Nashawaty, Entertainment Weekly
- 10th – Erik Henriksen, The Portland Mercury
- 10th – Kirk Baird, The Blade
- Honorable Mention – James Verniere, Boston Herald
- Honorable Mention – John Beifuss, The Commercial Appeal
- Honorable Mention – Kristian Lin, Fort Worth Weekly
- Honorable Mention – Brian Miller, Seattle Weekly
- Included in Best Documentaries – Ann Hornaday, Washington Post
- Runner Up – A.O. Scott, The New York Times
