= Chodorow =

Chodorow may refer to:

- Chodorów, the Polish name of Khodoriv, Galicia, now Ukraine

Surname

- Jeffrey Chodorow (born 1950), American restaurateur and financier
- Marvin Chodorow (1913–2005), American physicist
- Nancy Chodorow (1944–2025), American feminist sociologist and psychoanalyst
- Stanley Chodorow, historian and academic administrator

== See also ==
Related surnames

- Chodorowski (Khodorovsky)
- Khodorkovsky
- Jodorowsky (surname)
