= The Dance of Reality =

2013 film

- Theatrical release poster
- Directed by: Alejandro Jodorowsky
- Screenplay by: Alejandro Jodorowsky
- Based on: La Danza de la Realidad by Alejandro Jodorowsky
- Produced by: Alejandro Jodorowsky; Michel Seydoux
- Starring: Brontis Jodorowsky; Adán Jodorowsky; Jeremías Herskovits; Pamela Flores; Cristóbal Jodorowsky
- Cinematography: Jean-Marie Dreujou
- Edited by: Maryline Monthieux
- Music by: Adán Jodorowsky
- Production companies: Caméra One; Le Soleil Films
- Distributed by: Pathé
- Release dates: 18 May 2013 (Cannes); 23 May 2014 (United States); 21 August 2015 (United Kingdom)
- Running time: 133 minutes
- Countries: Chile; France
- Language: Spanish
- Budget: $3 million
- Box office: $558,636

The Dance of Reality (Spanish: La danza de la realidad) is a 2013 Chilean-French semi-autobiographical musical fantasy drama film written, produced, and directed by Alejandro Jodorowsky, starring Brontis Jodorowsky, Pamela Flores, and Jeremias Herskovits. It is Alejandro Jodorowsky's first film in 23 years. The film screened at Directors' Fortnight during the 2013 Cannes Film Festival. The film is based on an earlier work by Jodorowsky first published in Spanish under the title La danza de la realidad: Psicomagia y psicochamanismo (2001).

== Plot ==
Young Alejandro (Jeremías Herskovits) lives with his Jewish-Ukrainian parents Jaime (Brontis Jodorowsky) and Sara (Pamela Flores) in Tocopilla, Chile. Jaime is a communist who worships Stalin and raises his son with great severity. Sara sings rather than talks throughout the film, and believes Alejandro to be the reincarnation of her father because of his long blonde hair. Irritated by his wife's delusional views of their son and angered by Alejandro's behavior, which he views as cowardly and effeminate, Jaime cuts off Alejandro's hair (which is depicted as a wig in what appears to be magic realism), demands he repudiate the existence of God, and puts him through tests of self-control and bravery which include withstanding being tickled, slapped, and finally undergoing a dental operation without anesthetic. Satisfied with his son's bravery, Jaime acknowledges that he respects Alejandro and arranges for him to be made the mascot of the Tocopilla fire brigade.

Alejandro accompanies the fire brigade to the scene of a fire where one of the firemen becomes trapped in the house and burns to death. During the subsequent funeral procession, Alejandro imagines himself lying in the casket with the fireman’s corpse, and collapses from fright. Jaime takes him home, but burns the mascot's uniform in front of Alejandro when he wakes up, again calling his son a coward and claiming he is ashamed of him. In an attempt to prove his own bravery to the other firefighters, who he fears look down on him because of his son's cowardice and his Jewish heritage, Jaime attempts to distribute water to plague victims quarantined outside the town, but they kill and eat his donkeys and he himself is infected. He walks back to his shop, visibly infected, and a stand-off with the army ensues. As Jaime goes into convulsions and the army threaten to burn the shop to contain the infection, Sara prays for Jaime's recovery and urinates on him, curing him.

Energized by his miraculous recovery, Jaime plans to assassinate the right-wing president Carlos Ibáñez del Campo (Bastian Bodenhofer). He agrees to work with another communist to assassinate Ibáñez at a dog show, but the gun fails and Jaime passes himself off as a hero when he jumps between Ibáñez and the gunman. To get close to Ibáñez, Jaime asks for a job as groom to the president's beloved horse Bucephalus as payment for his heroism. Jaime then poisons Bucephalus as part of his plot to kill Ibáñez, but when Jaime has Ibáñez at gunpoint, his hands become paralysed.

The story returns to Alejandro and Sara, and Sara begins teaching Alejandro how not to be afraid of darkness and how to make sure people don't notice him. She tells him that she knows in her heart that Jaime is alive and loves both of them. They tie a stone to a balloon and release it in the belief it will find its way to him. The rock is then shown falling on the roof of a shack which Jaime is living in. Jaime awakes to discover that he has lost his memory, that he is living with a diminutive peasant woman, and that his arms have been painted the colors of the Chilean flag.

Jaime begins a long journey home, but is captured by Nazis and tortured. Rebels free Jaime and return him to his family in Tocopilla. Jaime's hands are healed when Sara tells him "You found in Ibáñez all you admired in Stalin. You are the same as they are! You have lived in the guise of a tyrant." Alejandro, Jaime, and Sara board a ship and leave Tocopilla.

== Cast ==
- Brontis Jodorowsky (Alejandro Jodorowsky's eldest son of four) as Jaime Jodorowsky
- Pamela Flores as Sara Jodorowsky
- Jeremías Herskovits (Alejandro Jodorowsky's grandson) as Young Alejandro
- Alejandro Jodorowsky as Old Alejandro
- Bastián Bodenhöfer as Carlos Ibáñez del Campo
- Andrés Cox as Don Aquiles
- Adán Jodorowsky (Alejandro Jodorowsky's youngest son) as Anarchist
- Cristóbal Jodorowsky (Alejandro Jodorowsky's son) as Theosophist
- Luz Jiménez como Queen of cups
- Marcelo Alonso as Nazi boss
- Sebastián Layseca as Nazi speaker
- Nicolás Saavedra as policeman
- Andrés Skoknic as torturer

== Production ==
After scouting for locations in Chile at his childhood village in early 2011, Alejandro Jodorowsky received permission from the local Chilean government to shoot in the coming spring. On August 22, 2011, he held a forum with the locals to discuss his vision with the film.

=== Filming ===
Shooting began in June 2012 and concluded the following August. Most of the film was shot in Tocopilla. Jodorowsky's wife, Pascale Montandon, was the costume designer for the film, and his three sons appeared in the film.

=== Post-production ===
In January 2013, Jodorowsky's son Brontis, a co-star of the film, stated that the film was in post-production and would be finished by March, saying the film is "very different from the other films that he made".

The film blends Jodorowsky's personal history with metaphor, mythology and poetry, reflecting the director's view that reality is not objective but rather a "dance" created by our imaginations: "The story of my life is a constant effort to expand the imagination and its limitations, to capture its therapeutic and transformative potential... An active imagination is the key to such a wide vision: it looks at life from angles that are not our own, imagining other levels of consciousness superior to our own".

Jodorowsky has expressed his ambivalence towards the film industry and its focus on making money and claimed he did not want to "make money but rather lose money" in the making of this film, asking for it to be funded purely through donations.

== Release ==
The film screened in The Directors' Fortnight at the 2013 Cannes Film Festival on May 18, 2013. It received a standing ovation.

The trailer was released on May 18, 2013. Reviewers remarked on its similarity to Jodorowsky's previous work and the influence of Federico Fellini's films.

Jodorowsky was planning for the film’s "international premiere" on June 7, 2013, to take place in the town of Tocopilla, where much of the film was set and shot.

The film had its US debut at the South by Southwest festival in March 2014.

=== Critical reception ===
The Dance of Reality received positive reviews from critics. Review aggregator website Rotten Tomatoes currently indicates that 94% of 63 critics gave the film a positive review, with an average rating of 7.4 out of 10. The site's critical consensus says, "This long-overdue return from Alejandro Jodorowsky finds him just as overflowing with imagination -- and heart -- as fans have come to expect." The film currently also holds a weighted average score of 76 out of 100 on Metacritic based on 21 critic reviews, indicating "generally favorable reviews".

Michael Atkinson of LA Weekly felt that "The Dance of Reality may be Alejandro Jodorowsky's best film". Peter Bradshaw of The Guardian called the film an "arresting spectacle," that was "swathed in surreal mythology dream logic and instant day-glo legend, resembling Fellini, Tod Browning, Emir Kusturica, and many more." Michael Phillips of Chicago Tribune wrote, "At more than two hours, The Dance of Reality unquestionably has its longueurs, but on balance it is alive with enough images and ideas for several movies—as if Jodorowsky were afraid he might have to wait 20 more years before making another."

Peter Sobczynski from RogerEbert.com awarded the film a full 4 stars out of 4, noting, "What is different this time around is that, for arguably the first time in his career, Jodorowsky has found the confidence to communicate his ideas to audiences in a direct and unapologetically emotional manner without falling back on his usual distancing techniques such as surreal imagery and extreme violence that made a film like El Topo so radical in its day (and which, to be frank, make it a little tiresome to endure nowadays)." The film was described by Stephanie Merry of The Washington Post as "a surreal autobiography that blends fantastical characters, Chilean politics, religious insights and the painful reality of adolescence". Eric Kohn of IndieWire gave it a "B+" rating, stating: "Sometimes it's gloriously entertaining, but at 130 minutes the loose surrealism occasionally grows tiresome".

=== Home media ===
The DVD and Blu-ray release of the film was scheduled for 26 August 2014. The film was released in DVD for free in Chile on 30 April 2015, as a "gift" from himself and The Clinic newspaper together with that publication.

== See also ==
- Cinema of Chile
