= Stella Díaz Varín =

Chilean poet (1926–2006)

- Born: Stella Adriana Díaz Varín; 11 August 1926; La Serena, Chile
- Died: 13 June 2006 (aged 79); Santiago, Chile
- Occupations: Poet, writer
- Spouse: Luis Viveros Jacques (1950–1966)
- Writing career
- Language: Spanish (Chilean)
- Genre: Poetry
- Notable works: Reason of my being Time, imaginary measure Symphony of fossil man Predictable gifts
- Notable awards: Municipal Pedro de Oña

Stella Díaz Varín (11 August 1926 – 13 June 2006), also known as La Colorina ("The Redhead"), was a Chilean poet of the Generation of '50. Her unprecedented deep and philosophical style, as well as her controversial personality, marked a before and after in Chilean poetry.

== Biography ==
Stella Díaz Varín was born on 11 August 1926 in La Serena, Chile, into a middle-class family. Her mother was a descendant of a highborn family of French origin that had fallen on hard times. Her father was an anarchist clockmaker who fostered in Díaz Varín her political ideals. Their economic situation and her father's ideas, together with her passionate readings, moved her from a very young age to write and publish poems and articles in local newspapers. In a public act in 1946, she read a poem in front of the Chilean president Gabriel González Videla which was dedicated to him. After this, the President helped her to settle in Santiago, a desire she had been nourishing since her father's death in 1935.

Díaz Varín moved to Santiago in 1947 to study medicine and psychiatry, despite the opposition of both her mother and older brother. Her interest in psychiatry came from her desire to scrutinize the human brain and understand the dreams of humans.

During her studies she wrote articles and poems for several newspapers: El Siglo, La Opinión (where she met Vicente Huidobro), El Extra (where she reported crimes in low-income sectors of Santiago) and La Hora. The closing of the newspapers in which she worked forced Díaz Varín to abandon her studies, which she never completed.

President González Videla, who had won the elections in 1946 with the support of the Communist Party, passed the Law of Permanent Defense of Democracy (Spanish: Ley de Defensa Permanente de la Democracia, N°8.987) which prohibited the existence of the Communist Party in Chile. Its members, Díaz Varín among them, became persecuted. Based on their mutual aversion toward the government, Díaz Varín, Enrique Lafourcade and Enrique Lihn tattooed a skull on their shoulders, symbolizing a pact to kill González Videla, whom they considered a dictator.

In 1949, the editor Domingo Morales helped Díaz Varín to publish her first book: Reason of My Being (Razón de mi ser). The poems of this volume reflect the vitality and strength of the poet; through suggestive images and an underground language she wrote about death, solitude and recognition of the feminine condition. These poems manifest the intricate relationship between the writer's life and poetical creation.

Díaz Varín died on 13 June 2006 in Santiago.

A fictionalized version of Díaz Varín appears in Alejandro Jodorowsky's autobiographical film Endless Poetry (2016), where she is played by Pamela Flores. Jodorowsky represents her as a Chilean Bukowski and the first punk woman poet (probably based on how beat literature has inspired punk and cyberpunk literature).

== Works ==
- Reason of my being, 1949
- Symphony of fossil man, 1953
- Time, as imaginary, 1959
- The gifts foreseeable, 1992
