= Alejandro Jodorowsky =

Chilean and French filmmaker (born 1929)

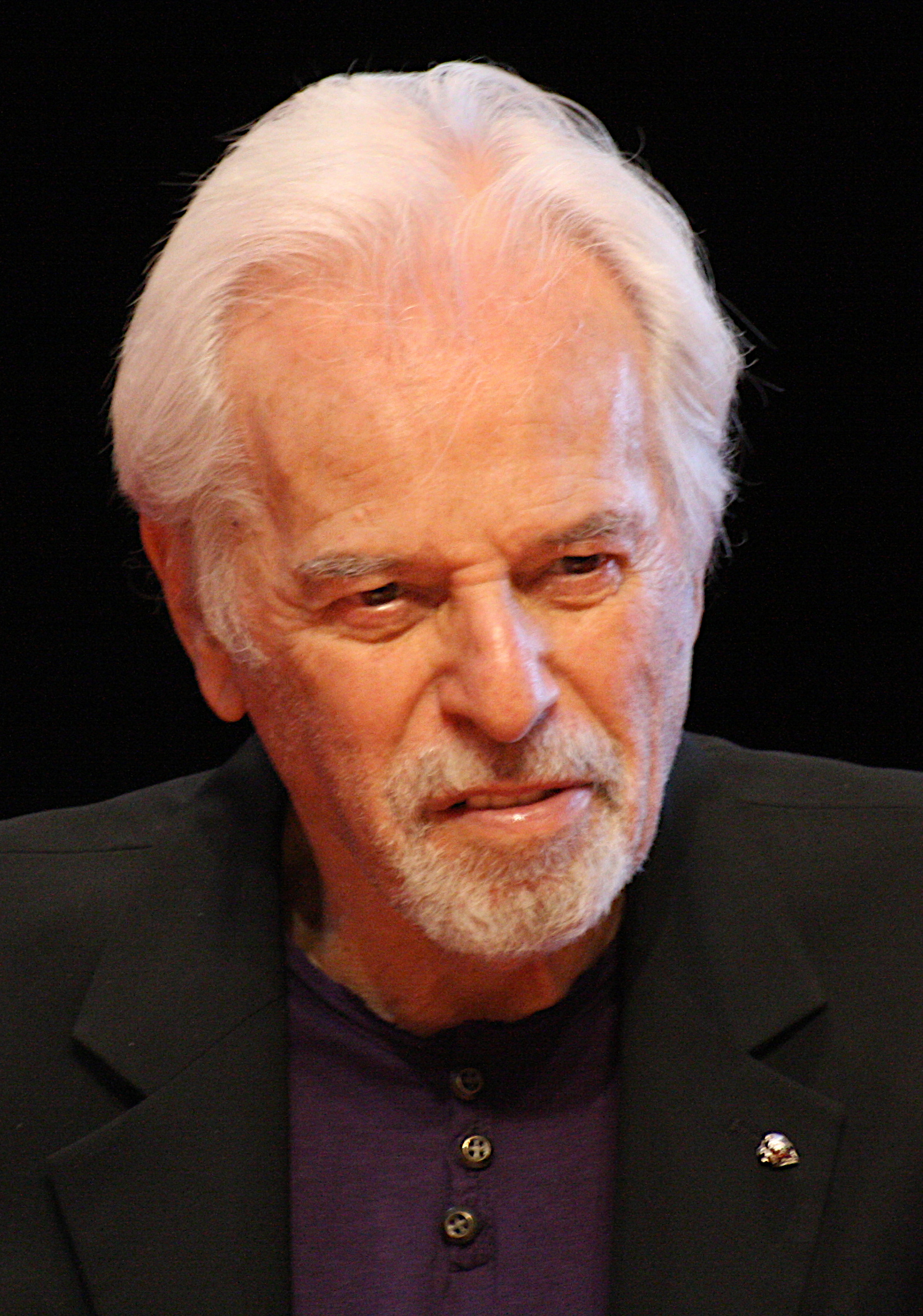
- Jodorowsky in 2011
- Born: Alejandro Jodorowsky Prullansky; 17 February 1929 (age 97); Tocopilla, Chile
- Citizenship: Chile; France
- Education: University of Chile; University of Paris
- Occupations: Film director; screenwriter; actor; author; magician
- Years active: 1948–present
- Movement: Panic Movement
- Spouses: Valérie Trumblay (div. 1982); Pascale Montandon (m. 2003)
- Children: 5, including Brontis, Axel and Adán
- Relatives: Alma Jodorowsky (granddaughter)

Alejandro Jodorowsky Prullansky (Spanish: [aleˈxandɾo xoðoˈɾofski]; born 17 February 1929) is a Chilean and French avant-garde filmmaker and writer. Known for his films El Topo (1970), The Holy Mountain (1973) and Santa Sangre (1989), Jodorowsky has been "venerated by cult cinema enthusiasts" for his work which "is filled with violently surreal images and a hybrid blend of mysticism and religious provocation".

Dropping out of college, he became involved in theater and in particular mime, working as a clown before founding his own theater troupe, the Teatro Mímico, in 1947. Moving to Paris in the early 1950s, Jodorowsky studied traditional mime under Étienne Decroux, and put his miming skills to use in the silent film Les têtes interverties (1957), directed with Saul Gilbert and Ruth Michelly. From 1960 onwards he divided his time between Mexico City and Paris, where he co-founded Panic Movement, a surrealist performance art collective that staged violent and shocking theatrical events. In 1966 he created his first comic strip, Anibal 5, and in 1967 he directed his first feature film, the surrealist Fando y Lis, which caused a major scandal in Mexico, eventually being banned.

His next film, the acid western El Topo, became a hit on the midnight movie circuit in the United States, considered the first-ever midnight cult film, and garnered high praise from John Lennon, who convinced former Beatles manager Allen Klein to provide Jodorowsky with $1 million to finance his next film. The result was The Holy Mountain, a surrealist exploration of western esotericism. Disagreements with Klein, however, led to both The Holy Mountain and El Topo failing to gain widespread distribution, although both became classics on the underground film circuit. After a cancelled attempt at filming Frank Herbert's 1965 science fiction novel Dune, Jodorowsky produced five more films: the family film Tusk (1980); the surrealist horror Santa Sangre; the failed blockbuster The Rainbow Thief (1990); and the first two films in a planned five-film autobiographical series The Dance of Reality (2013) and Endless Poetry (2016).

Jodorowsky is also a comic book writer, most notably penning the science fiction series The Incal throughout the 1980s. Other comic books he has written include The Technopriests and Metabarons. Jodorowsky has also extensively written and lectured about his own spiritual system, which he calls "psychomagic" and "psychoshamanism", which borrows from alchemy, the tarot, Zen Buddhism and shamanism. His son Cristóbal has followed his teachings on psychoshamanism; this work is captured in the feature documentary Quantum Men, directed by Carlos Serrano Azcona.

== Early life and education ==
=== Early life ===
Alejandro Jodorowsky was born on 17 February 1929, in Tocopilla, Chile to immigrant Ukrainian Jewish parents Jaime Jodorowsky Groismann and Sara Felicidad Prullansky Arcavi from Yekaterinoslav and Elisavetgrad in the Russian Empire. According to Jodorowsky's account, he was conceived as a result of spousal rape, as his father was often abusive. His mother subsequently disliked Jodorowsky, and detested his father. Alejandro also had an elder sister, Raquel Jodorowsky, but believed she was selfish and trying to "expel me from the family so that she could be the centre of attention." Alongside his dislike for his family, he also held contempt for many of the local people who he says disliked the family's immigrant status. Jodorowsky did not have a Bar Mitzvah or celebrate any Jewish holidays as his parents concealed their Jewish identity for much of Jodorowsky's life.

Jodorowsky moved to Santiago at the age of 9, a decision he did not favor, as he liked the local areas of Tocopilla. Growing up, his dislike of the American mining industrialists who worked locally and treated the Chilean people badly later influenced his condemnation of American imperialism and neo-colonialism in Latin America in several of his films.

He immersed himself in reading, and also began writing poetry, having his first poem published when he was sixteen years old. He associated with such Chilean poets as Nicanor Parra, Stella Díaz Varín and Enrique Lihn. Becoming interested in the political ideology of anarchism, Jodorowsky briefly attended the University of Chile, studying psychology and philosophy, but dropped out after two years. After leaving university, he developed an interest in theatre and particularly mime, he took up employment in a circus as a clown, as well as beginning a career as a theatre director. Meanwhile, in 1947 he founded his own theatrical troupe, the Teatro Mimico, which by 1952 had fifty members, and the following year he wrote his first play, El Minotaura (The Minotaur).

=== Performing arts career and Panic Movement foundation ===
Jodorowsky moved to France as he felt there was little for him left in Chile. He settled in Paris and started to study philosophy at the Sorbonne. He also started to study mime with French actor Étienne Decroux and joined the troupe of one of Decroux's students, Marcel Marceau. It was with Marceau's troupe that he went on a world tour, and wrote several routines for the group, including "The Cage" and "The Mask Maker". After this, he returned to theatre directing, working on the music hall comeback of Maurice Chevalier in Paris.

In 1960, Jodorowsky moved to Mexico, where he settled down in Mexico City. He continued to return occasionally to France, on one occasion visiting the Surrealist artist André Breton, but had increasingly felt disillusioned by him as he felt he had become somewhat conservative in his old age. Continuing his interest in surrealism, in 1962 he founded the Panic Movement along with Fernando Arrabal and Roland Topor. The movement aimed to go beyond conventional surrealist ideas by embracing absurdism. Its members refused to take themselves seriously, while laughing at those critics who did.

In Mexico City he encountered Ejo Takata (1928–1997), a Zen Buddhist monk. Takata had studied at the Horyu-ji and Shofuku-ji monasteries in Japan before traveling to Mexico via the U.S. in 1967 to spread Zen. Jodorowsky became a disciple of Takata and offered his own house to be turned into a Zendō. Subsequently, Takata attracted other disciples, who spent their time in meditation and the study of koans. Eventually, Takata instructed Jodorowsky to learn more about his feminine side, and so he went and befriended the English surrealist Leonora Carrington, who had recently moved to Mexico.

== Film career ==
=== Early comics and films ===
In 1957, while Jodorowsky was in Paris studying mime, he created Les têtes interverties (The Severed Heads), a 20-minute adaptation of Thomas Mann's novella. It consisted almost entirely of mime and told the surreal story of a head-swapping merchant who helps a young man find courtship success. Jodorowsky played the lead role. The director Jean Cocteau admired the film and wrote an introduction for it. It was considered lost until a print of the film was discovered in 2006.

In 1966, he produced his first comic strip, Anibal 5, which was related to the Panic Movement. The following year he created a new feature film, Fando y Lis, loosely based on a play written by Fernando Arrabal, who was working with Jodorowsky on performance art at the time. Fando y Lis premiered at the 1968 Acapulco Film Festival, where it instigated a riot amongst those objecting to the film's content, and was subsequently banned in Mexico.

=== El Topo and The Holy Mountain (1970–1974) ===
In 1970, Jodorowsky released the film El Topo, which sometimes is known in English as The Mole, which he had both directed and starred in. An acid western, El Topo tells the story of a wandering Mexican bandit and gunslinger, El Topo (played by Jodorowsky), who is on a search for spiritual enlightenment, taking his young son along with him. Along the way, he violently confronts a number of other individuals, before finally being killed and being resurrected to live within a community of deformed people who are trapped inside a mountain cave. Describing the work, he stated that "I ask of film what most North Americans ask of psychedelic drugs. The difference being that when one creates a psychedelic film, he need not create a film that shows the visions of a person who has taken a pill; rather, he needs to manufacture the pill." Knowing how Fando y Lis had caused such a scandal in Mexico, Jodorowsky decided not to release El Topo there, instead focusing on its release in other countries across the world, including Mexico's northern neighbour, the United States. It was in New York City where the film would play as a "midnight movie" for several months at Ben Barenholtz's Elgin Theater. It attracted the attention of rock musician and countercultural figure John Lennon, who thought very highly of it, and convinced the president of The Beatles' company Apple Corps, Allen Klein, to distribute it in the United States.

Klein agreed to give Jodorowsky $1 million to go toward creating his next film. The result was The Holy Mountain, released in 1973. It has been suggested that The Holy Mountain may have been inspired by René Daumal's Surrealist novel Mount Analogue. The Holy Mountain was another complex, multi-part story that featured a man credited as "The Thief" and equated with Jesus Christ, a mystical alchemist played by Jodorowsky, seven powerful business people representing seven of the planets (Venus and the six planets from Mars to Pluto), a religious training regimen of spiritual rebirth, and a quest to the top of a holy mountain for the secret of immortality. During the completion of The Holy Mountain, Jodorowsky received spiritual training from Oscar Ichazo of the Arica School, who encouraged him to take LSD and guided him through the subsequent psychedelic experience. Around the same time (2 November 1973), Jodorowsky participated in an isolation tank experiment conducted by John Lilly.

Shortly thereafter, Allen Klein demanded that Jodorowsky create a film adaptation of Pauline Réage's classic novel of female masochism, Story of O. Klein had promised this adaptation to various investors. Jodorowsky, who had discovered feminism during the filming of The Holy Mountain, refused to make the film, going so far as to leave the country to escape directing duties. In retaliation, Allen Klein made El Topo and The Holy Mountain, to which he held the rights, completely unavailable to the public for more than 30 years. Jodorowsky frequently decried Klein's actions in interviews.

Soon after the release of The Holy Mountain, Jodorowsky gave a talk at the Teatro Julio Castillo, University of Mexico on the subject of koans (despite the fact that he initially had been booked on the condition that his talk would be about cinematography), at which Ejo Takata appeared. After the talk, Takata gave Jodorowsky his kyosaku, believing that his former student had mastered the art of understanding koans.

=== Dune and Tusk (1975–1980) ===
In December 1974, a French consortium led by Jean-Paul Gibon purchased the film rights to Frank Herbert's epic 1965 science fiction novel Dune and asked Jodorowsky to direct a film version. Jodorowsky planned to cast the Surrealist artist Salvador Dalí, in what would have been his only speaking role as a film actor, in the role of Emperor Shaddam IV. Dalí agreed when Jodorowsky offered to pay him a fee of $100,000 per hour. He also planned to cast Orson Welles as Baron Vladimir Harkonnen; Welles only agreed when Jodorowsky offered to get his favourite gourmet chef to prepare his meals for him throughout the filming. The book's protagonist, Paul Atreides, was to be played by Jodorowsky's son, Brontis Jodorowsky, 12 years old at the start of pre-production. The music would be composed by Pink Floyd and Magma. Jodorowsky set up a pre-production unit in Paris consisting of Chris Foss, a British artist who designed covers for science fiction publications, Jean Giraud (Mœbius), a French illustrator who created and also wrote and drew for Métal Hurlant magazine, and H. R. Giger.

Frank Herbert travelled to Europe in 1976 to find that $2 million of the $9.5 million budget had already been spent in pre-production, and that Jodorowsky's script would result in a 14-hour movie ("It was the size of a phonebook", Herbert later recalled). Jodorowsky took creative liberties with the source material, but Herbert said that he and Jodorowsky had an amicable relationship. The production for the film collapsed when no film studio could be found willing to fund the movie to Jodorowsky's terms. The aborted production was chronicled in the documentary Jodorowsky's Dune, directed by Frank Pavich. Subsequently, the rights for filming were sold to Dino De Laurentiis, who employed the American filmmaker David Lynch to direct, creating the film Dune in 1984. The documentary does not include any original film footage of what was to be Jodorowsky's Dune though it states that the unmade film was an influence on other science fiction films, such as Star Wars, Alien, The Terminator, Flash Gordon and Raiders of the Lost Ark. In particular, the Jodorowsky-assembled team of O'Bannon, Foss, Giger, and Giraud went on to collaborate on the 1979 film Alien. Later, in January 2023, Frank Pavich, director of the documentary film Jodorowsky's Dune, published an essay in The New York Times related to Jodorowsky's Dune (and more) that involved artwork generated by generative AI.

After the collapse of the Dune project, Jodorowsky completely changed course and, in 1980, premiered his children's fable Tusk, shot in India. Taken from Reginald Campbell's novel Poo Lorn of the Elephants, the film explores the soul-mate relationship between a young British woman living in India and a highly prized elephant. The film exhibited little of the director's outlandish visual style and was never given wide release.

=== Santa Sangre and The Rainbow Thief (1981–1990) ===
In 1989, Jodorowsky completed the Mexican-Italian production Santa Sangre (Holy Blood). The film received limited theatrical distribution, putting Jodorowsky back on the cultural map despite its mixed critical reviews. Santa Sangre was a surrealistic slasher film with a plot like a mix of Alfred Hitchcock's Psycho with Robert Wiene's The Hands of Orlac. It featured a protagonist who, as a child, saw his mother lose both her arms, and as an adult let his own arms act as hers, and so was forced to commit murders at her whim. Several of Jodorowsky's sons were recruited as actors.

He followed in 1990 with a very different film, The Rainbow Thief. Though it gave Jodorowsky a chance to work with the "movie stars" Peter O'Toole and Omar Sharif, the executive producer, Alexander Salkind, effectively curtailed most of Jodorowsky's artistic inclinations, threatening to fire him on the spot if anything in the script was changed (Salkind's wife, Berta Domínguez D., wrote the screenplay).

That same year (1990), Jodorowsky and his family returned to France to live.

=== Attempts to return to filmmaking (1990–2011) ===
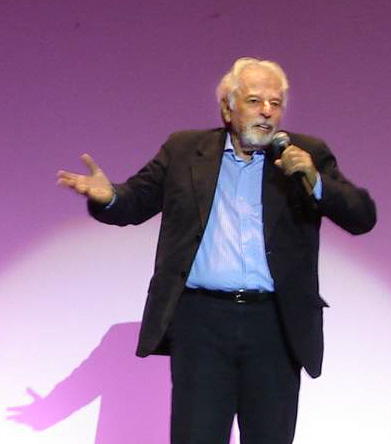
Jodorowsky in Sitges, Spain (2006)

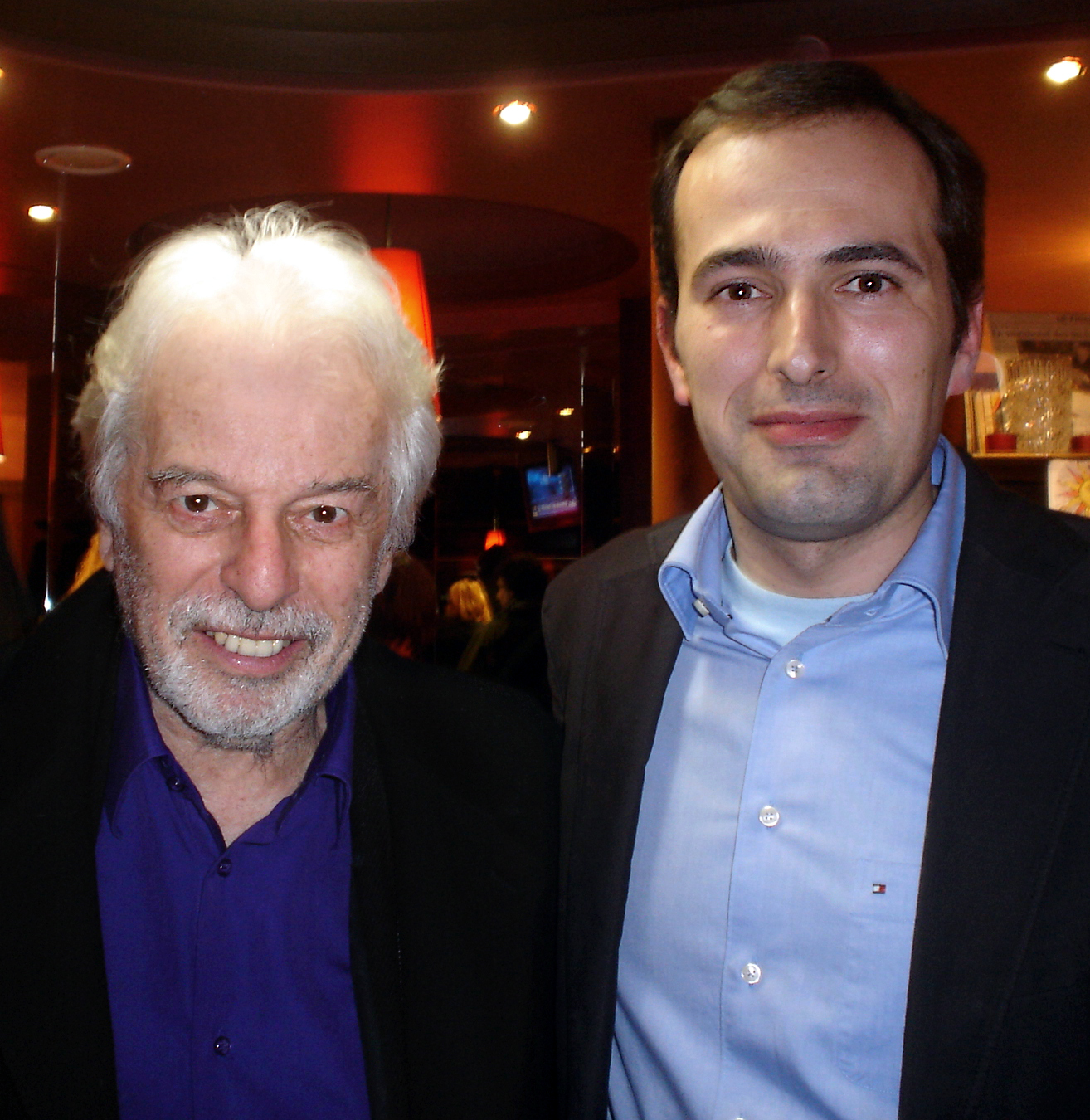
Jodorowsky (left) and Spanish writer Diego Moldes in Paris (2008)

In 2000, Jodorowsky won the Jack Smith Lifetime Achievement Award from the Chicago Underground Film Festival (CUFF). Jodorowsky attended the festival and his films were shown, including El Topo and The Holy Mountain, which at the time had grey legal status. According to festival director Bryan Wendorf, it was an open question of whether CUFF would be allowed to show both films, or whether the police would show up and shut the festival down.

Until 2007, Fando y Lis and Santa Sangre were the only Jodorowsky works available on DVD. Neither El Topo nor The Holy Mountain were available on videocassette or DVD in the United States or the United Kingdom, due to ownership disputes with distributor Allen Klein. After settlement of the dispute in 2004, however, plans to re-release Jodorowsky's films were announced by ABKCO Films. On 19 January 2007, it was announced online that Anchor Bay would release a box set including El Topo, The Holy Mountain, and Fando y Lis on 1 May 2007. A limited edition of the set includes both the El Topo and The Holy Mountain soundtracks. And, in early February 2007, Tartan Video announced its 14 May 2007, release date for the UK PAL DVD editions of El Topo, The Holy Mountain, and the six-disc box set which, alongside the aforementioned feature films, includes the two soundtrack CDs, as well as separate DVD editions of Jodorowsky's 1968 debut feature Fando y Lis (with his 1957 short La cravate a.k.a. Les têtes interverties, included as an extra) and the 1994 feature-length documentary La constellation Jodorowsky. Notably, Fando y Lis and La cravate were digitally restored extensively and remastered in London during late 2006, thus providing a suitable complement to the quality restoration work undertaken on El Topo and The Holy Mountain in the States by ABKCO, and ensuring that the presentation of Fando y Lis is a significant improvement over the 2001 Fantoma DVD edition. Prior to the availability of these legitimate releases, only inferior quality, optically censored, bootleg copies of both El Topo and The Holy Mountain have been circulated on the Internet and on DVD.

In the 1990s and early 2000s, Jodorowsky attempted to make a sequel to El Topo, called at different times The Sons of El Topo and Abel Cain, but did not find investors for the project.

In an interview with Première, Jodorowsky said he intended his next project to be a gangster film called King Shot. In an interview with The Guardian newspaper in November 2009, however, Jodorowsky revealed that he was unable to find the funds to make King Shot, and instead would be entering preparations on Sons of El Topo, for which he claimed to have signed a contract with "some Russian producers".

In 2010, the Museum of Arts and Design in New York City staged the first American cinema retrospective of Alejandro Jodorowsky entitled Blood into Gold: The Cinematic Alchemy of Alejandro Jodorowsky. Jodorowsky would attend the retrospective and hold a master class on art as a way of transformation. This retrospective would inspire the museum MoMA PS1 to present the exhibition Alejandro Jodorowsky: The Holy Mountain in 2011.

=== The Dance of Reality and Endless Poetry (2011–present) ===
In August 2011, Alejandro arrived in a town in Chile where he grew up, also the setting of his autobiography The Dance of Reality, to promote an autobiographical film based upon his book.

On 31 October 2011, Halloween night, the Museum of Modern Art (New York City) honored Jodorowsky by showing The Holy Mountain. He attended and spoke about his work and life. The next evening, he presented El Topo at the Walter Reade Theatre at Lincoln Center.

Alejandro has stated that after finishing The Dance of Reality he was preparing to shoot his long-gestating El Topo sequel, Abel Cain. By January 2013, Alejandro finished filming on The Dance of Reality and entered into post-production. Alejandro's son and co-star in the film, Brontis, claimed the film was to be finished by March 2013, and that the film was "very different than the other films he made". On 23 April, it was announced that the film would have its world premiere at the Film Festival in Cannes. coinciding with The Dance of Reality premiered alongside the documentary film Jodorowsky's Dune, which premiered in May 2013 at the Cannes Film Festival, creating a "Jodorowsky double bill".

In 2015, Jodorowsky began a new film entitled Endless Poetry, the sequel to his last "auto-biopic", The Dance of Reality. His Paris-based production company, Satori Films, launched two successful crowdfunding campaigns to finance the film. The Indiegogo campaign has been left open indefinitely, receiving donations from fans and movie-goers in support of the independent production. The film was shot between June and August 2015, in the streets of Matucana in Santiago, Chile, where Jodorowsky lived for a period in his life. The film portrays his young adulthood in Santiago, years during which he became a core member of the Chilean poetic avant-garde alongside artists such as Hugo Marín, Gustavo Becerra, Enrique Lihn, Stella Díaz Varín, Nicanor Parra and others. Jodorowsky's son Adan Jodorowsky plays him as an adult; and Brontis Jodorowsky plays as his father, Jaime. Jeremias Herskovitz, from The Dance of Reality, portrays Jodorowsky as a teenager. Pamela Flores plays as Sara (his mother) and Stella Díaz Varín (poet and young Jodorowsky's girlfriend). Leandro Taub portrays Jodorowsky's best friend, the poet and novelist Enrique Lihn. The film premiered in the Directors' Fortnight section of the Cannes Film Festival on 14 May 2016. Variety's review was overwhelmingly positive, calling it "...the most accessible movie he has ever made, and it may also be the best."

During an interview at the Cannes Film Festival in 2016, Jodorowsky announced his plans to finally make The Son of El Topo as soon as financial backing is obtained.

== Other work ==
Jodorowsky released a 12" vinyl with the Original Soundtrack of Zarathustra (Discos Tizoc, Mexico, 1970).

=== Comics ===
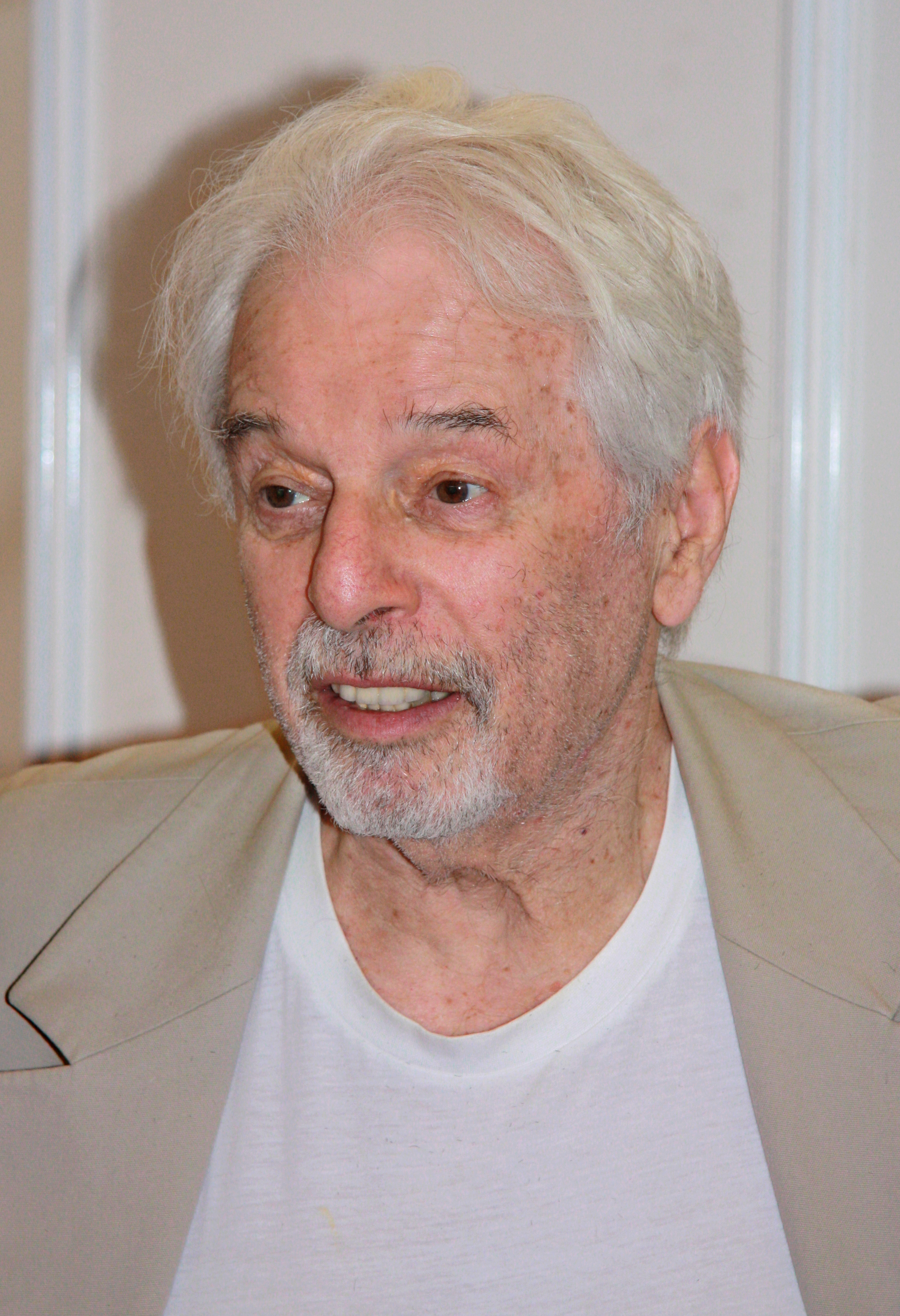
Jodorowsky at the 2008 Japan Expo in Paris

Jodorowsky started his comic career in Mexico with the creation of Anibal 5 series in mid-1966 with illustrations by Manuel Moro. He also drew his own comic strip in the weekly series Fabulas pánicas that appeared in the Mexican newspaper, El Heraldo de México. He also wrote original stories for at least two or three other comic books in Mexico during those days: Los insoportables Borbolla was one of them. After his fourth film, Tusk, he started The Incal, with Jean Giraud (Mœbius). This graphic novel has its roots deep in the tarot and its symbols, e.g., the protagonist of The Incal, John Difool, is linked to the Fool card. The Incal (which would branch off into a prequel and sequel) forms the first in a sequence of several science fiction comic book series, all set in the same space opera Jodoverse (or "Metabarons Universe") published by Humanoids Publishing.

Comic books set in this milieu are the Incal trilogy, the Metabarons trilogy, and The Technopriests. Many ideas and concepts derived from Jodorowsky's planned adaptation of Dune (loosely based upon Frank Herbert's original novel) are featured in this universe.

Mœbius and Jodorowsky sued Luc Besson, director of The Fifth Element, claiming that the 1997 film borrowed graphic and story elements from The Incal, but they lost their case. The suit was plagued by ambiguity since Mœbius had willingly participated in the creation of the film, having been hired by Besson as a contributing artist, but had done so without gaining the approval of Incal co-creator Jodorowsky, whose services Besson did not call upon. For more than a decade, Jodorowsky pressured his publisher Les Humanoïdes Associés to sue Luc Besson for plagiarism, but the publisher refused, fearing the inevitability of the outcome. In a 2002 interview with the Danish comic book magazine Strip!, Jodorowsky stated that he considered it an honour that somebody stole his ideas.

Other comics by Jodorowsky include the Western Bouncer illustrated by Francois Boucq, Juan Solo (Son of the Gun), and Le Lama blanc (The White Lama), the latter were illustrated by Georges Bess.

Le Cœur couronné (The Crowned Heart, translated into English as The Madwoman of the Sacred Heart), a racy satire on religion set in contemporary times, won Jodorowsky and his collaborator, Jean Giraud, the 2001 Haxtur Award for Best Long Strip. He is currently working on a new graphic novel for the U.S. market.

Jodorowsky's comic book work also appears in Taboo volume 4 (ed. Stephen R. Bissette), which features an interview with the director, designs for his version of Frank Herbert's Dune, comic storyboards for El Topo, and a collaboration with Moebius with the illustrated Eyes of the Cat.

Jodorowsky collaborated with Milo Manara in Borgia (2006), a graphic novel about the history of the House of Borgia.

=== Psychomagic ===
Jodorowsky spent almost a decade reconstructing the original form of the Tarot de Marseille. From this work he moved into more therapeutic work in three areas: psychomagic, psychogenealogy and initiatic massage. Psychomagic aims to heal psychological wounds suffered in life. This therapy is based on the belief that the performance of certain acts can directly act upon the unconscious mind, releasing it from a series of traumas, some of which practitioners of the therapy believe are passed down from generation to generation. Psychogenealogy includes the studying of the patient's personality and family tree in order to best address their specific sources. It is similar, in its phenomenological approach to genealogy, to the Constellations pioneered by Bert Hellinger.

Jodorowsky has several books on his therapeutic methods, including Psicomagia: La trampa sagrada (Psychomagic: The Sacred Trap) and his autobiography, La danza de la realidad (The Dance of Reality), which he was filming as a feature-length film in March 2012. To date, he has published more than 23 novels and philosophical treatises, along with dozens of articles and interviews. His books are widely read in Spanish and French, but are for the most part unknown to English-speaking audiences.

For a quarter of a century, Jodorowsky held classes and lectures for free, in cafés and universities all over the city of Paris. Typically, such courses or talks would begin on Wednesday evenings as tarot divination lessons, and would culminate in an hour-long conference, also free, where at times hundreds of attendees would be treated to live demonstrations of a psychological "arbre généalogique" ("tree of genealogy") involving volunteers from the audience. In these conferences, Jodorowsky would pave the way to building a strong base of students of his philosophy, which deals with understanding the unconscious as the "over-self", composed of many generations of family relatives, living or deceased, acting on the psyche, well into adult lives, and causing compulsions. Of all his work, Jodorowsky considers these activities to be the most important of his life. Though such activities only take place in the insular world of Parisian cafés, he has devoted thousands of hours of his life to teaching and helping people "become more conscious," as he puts it.

Since 2011 these talks have dwindled to once a month and take place at the Librairie Les Cent Ciels in Paris.

His film Psychomagic, a Healing Art premiered in Lyon on 3 September 2019. It was then released on streaming services on 1 August 2020.

== Influences and impact ==
He has cited the filmmaker Federico Fellini as his primary cinematic influence; other artistic influences included Jean-Luc Godard, Sergio Leone, Erich von Stroheim, Buster Keaton, George Gurdjieff, Antonin Artaud, and Luis Buñuel. He has been described as an influence on such figures as Marilyn Manson, Darren Aronofsky, Taika Waititi, Guillermo del Toro, Nicolas Winding Refn, Peter Chung, Takashi Okazaki, Jan Kounen, Dennis Hopper, Eric Andre, the musical duo Suicide, and Kanye West.

Fans included musicians Peter Gabriel, Cedric Bixler-Zavala and Omar Rodríguez-López of The Mars Volta, Brann Dailor of Mastodon, Luke Steele and Nick Littlemore (of the pop-duo Empire of the Sun). Wes Borland, guitarist of Limp Bizkit, said that the film Holy Mountain was a big influence on him, especially as a visual artist, and that the concept album Lotus Island of his band Black Light Burns was a tribute to it. Lady Gaga was influenced by Jodorowsky and The Holy Mountain in the video for her song 911.

Danish director Nicolas Winding Refn thanks Alejandro Jodorowsky in the ending titles of his 2011 film Drive, and dedicated his 2013 Thai crime thriller, Only God Forgives, to Jodorowsky. Jodorowsky also appeared in the documentary My Life Directed by Nicolas Winding Refn, directed by Refn's wife Liv, giving the couple a tarot reading.

Jodorowsky has influenced the poetic work of his friend Diego Moldes, in two books: Ni un día sin poesía (Not One Day Without Poetry, Madrid, 2018), with a prologue by Alejandro Jodorowsky and in Ni una poesía sin día-Not a Poem Without a Day (New York, 2023).

Argentinean actor Leandro Taub thanks Alejandro Jodorowsky in his book La Mente Oculta, for which Jodorowsky wrote the prologue.

== Personal life ==
Jodorowsky holds both Chilean and French citizenship. His first wife was the actress Valérie Trumblay. They had three sons: Teo, Axel "Cristobal", and Adan. They divorced in 1982. He is currently married to the artist and costume designer Pascale Montandon.

He had five children.

- Brontis Jodorowsky (b. 1962), an actor who worked with his father in El Topo, The Dance of Reality and Endless Poetry, is the child of Jodorowsky and Bernadette Landru. Brontis has a child, the fashion model Alma Jodorowsky, who is the granddaughter of Alejandro.
- Teo (d. 1995), who appeared in Santa Sangre, was the eldest child of Jodorowsky and Valérie Trumblay.
- Axel Cristóbal (b. 1965, d. 2022), a psychoshaman and an actor (interpreter in Santa Sangre and the main character in the shamanic documentary Quantum Men), was the second child of Jodorowsky and Valérie Trumblay.
- Eugenia Jodorowsky, Jodorowsky's fourth child, is the child of Jodorowsky and an unknown mother.
- Adan Jodorowsky (b. 1979), a musician known by his stage name of Adanowsky, was the third child of Jodorowsky and Valérie Trumblay, and Jodorowsky's fifth child overall.

On his religious views, Jodorowsky has called himself an "atheist mystic".

He does not drink or smoke, and has stated that he does not eat red meat or poultry because he "does not like corpses", basing his diet on vegetables, fruits, grains and occasionally marine products.

In 2005, Jodorowsky officiated at the wedding of Marilyn Manson and Dita Von Teese.

== Criticism and controversy ==
When Jodorowsky's first feature film, Fando y Lis, premiered at the 1968 Acapulco Film Festival, the screening was controversial and erupted into a riot, due to its graphic content. Jodorowsky had to leave the theatre by sneaking outside to a waiting limousine, and when the crowd outside the theatre recognized him, the car was pelted with rocks. The following week, the film opened to sell-out crowds in Mexico City, but more fights broke out, and the film was banned by the Mexican government. Jodorowsky himself was nearly deported and the controversy provided a great deal of fodder for the Mexican newspapers.

In regard to the making of El Topo, Jodorowsky allegedly stated in the early 1970s:

When I wanted to do the rape scene, I explained to [Mara Lorenzio] that I was going to hit her and rape her. There was no emotional relationship between us, because I had put a clause in all the women's contracts stating that they would not make love with the director. We had never talked to each other. I knew nothing about her. We went to the desert with two other people: the photographer and a technician. No one else. I said, 'I'm not going to rehearse. There will be only one take because it will be impossible to repeat. Roll the cameras only when I signal you to.' Then I told her, 'Pain does not hurt. Hit me.' And she hit me. I said, 'Harder.' And she started to hit me very hard, hard enough to break a rib...I ached for a week. After she had hit me long enough and hard enough to tire her, I said, 'Now it's my turn. Roll the cameras.' And I really...I really...I really raped her. And she screamed ... Then she told me that she had been raped before. You see, for me the character is frigid until El Topo rapes her. And she has an orgasm. That's why I show a stone phallus in that scene ... which spouts water. She has an orgasm. She accepts the male sex. And that's what happened to Mara in reality. She really had that problem. Fantastic scene. A very, very strong scene.

In the documentary Jodorowsky's Dune, Jodorowsky states:

When you make a picture, you must not respect the novel. It's like getting married ... if you respect the woman, you will never have child. You need to open the costume and to rape the bride – and then you will have your picture. I was raping Frank Herbert ... but with love.

Jodorowsky was criticised for these statements. Matt Brown of Screen Anarchy wrote that "it's easier to wall off a certain type of criminality behind the buffer of time—sure, Alejandro Jodorowsky is on the record in his book on the making of the film as having raped Mara Lorenzo while making El Topo—though he later denied it—but nowadays he's just that hilarious old kook from Jodorowsky's Dune!" Emmet Asher-Perrin of Tor.com called Jodorowsky "an artist who condones rape as a means to an end for the purpose of creating art. A man who seems to believe that rape is something that women 'need' if they can't accept male sexual power on their own". Jude Doyle of Elle wrote that Jodorowsky "has been teasing the idea of an unsimulated rape scene in his cult classic film El Topo for decades ... though he's elsewhere described the unsimulated sex in that scene as consensual", and went on to state that the quote "has not endangered his status as an avant-garde icon".

On 26 June 2017, Jodorowsky released a statement on his Facebook account in response to the question: "Did you rape an actress during the filming of El Topo?" The following excerpts are from said statement:

Where did [the people claiming that I raped Mara Lorenzio on the set of El Topo in front of the camera] find reports of this alleged incident that would have happened in 1969?

It's very possible that they read some of the interviews I did in the United States or England back then. I produced El Topo independently. When I told the Mexican film industry that I was going to travel to New York to sell El Topo, they made fun of me. "You're crazy, only Emilio Fernandez ('El Indio') has ever managed to release a movie there and that's why there is a statue of him. No Mexican film has ever crossed the cactus wall." In the North American cinematographic environment of the time, Mexican cinema was despised. Hollywood dominated everything.

I had to break through using the only tool I had: shock through scandalous statements. This is how I did it: I dressed up as the mystical bandit character [the titular El Topo], I introduced myself in the interviews with a beard, a mane and a black leather suit, and I said things that purposefully shocked the interviewers. "I am an anti-feminist, I hate women. I hate cats. I've eaten human meat tacos with Diego Rivera. El Topo is a film where things really happened: that scene of rape is a real rape! I killed the animals (that in reality I had purchased dead from a local zoo) with a fork I sharpened myself!" These aggressive, meant to be humorous declarations conquered the era's young public who were against the establishment and affected by the Vietnam war. This is how I managed to get El Topo to be noticed and seen, and, thanks to the openly proclaimed admiration of John Lennon and Yoko Ono, my film became a cult classic. Half a century has passed and it continues to be screened and discussed.

Jodorowsky also offered details in that same statement on the filming of the so-called "rape scene", proclaiming that it would be impossible to commit such a crime on a large movie set:

Filming a scene like this is not achieved with just a cameraman, two actors and an expanse of sand. Cinema is the most costly art because a large number of technicians and artists are required to execute it. First of all, you needed a group of workers to clean a hundred square meters of desert with rakes because of dangerous snakes and spiders that were hidden in the sand. They remained for the duration of the filming, at the ready, to intervene if necessary. There was also a group of makeup artists, hairdressers and dressmakers in charge of costumes.

[In the movie,] El Topo rips apart the woman's dress in a take that lasts 10 seconds.

It is followed by another take of El Topo [doing the same], but from a different angle. Filming stopped for half an hour or so for the technicians to change the reflectors. That is to say that in order to shoot an action sequence that does not even last more than three minutes, several hours were needed. And it wasn't just a single cameraman, but two cameras, each with one operator and four assistants. A total of 10 camera people. Added to this were crewmen placing rails where the camera slid, handling the counterweights of a crane, holding silver reflector cards so that each face is well-lit. There was also the assistant director, the group of set decorators, other actors, etc. A big crowd that the audience does not see. In addition, there were people holding the individual umbrellas protecting the actors from the sun, others that delivered water and food, etc.

How could I have possibly assaulted the actress in front of such a large assembly of people?

At the slightest hint of any actual violence, a group of men and women would have thrown themselves at me and immobilized me. The actress would have also been defending herself, howling, scratching. And I, vile satyr, would have ended up persecuted, tried and imprisoned.

In July 2016, Jodorowsky sparked controversy on Twitter when he posted a tweet stating:

Incest can be violent, but it can also be seductive. It may not be destructive or awaken an Oedipus Complex.

This message provoked negative reactions across the site, with one user replying: "I was raped as a child. Now, despite loving my partner, I still cannot pleasure him.", to which Jodorowsky replied:

Pretend he's the man who raped you. That'll make you horny.

Jodorowsky proceeded to delete this reply afterwards, stating:

I didn't delete the tweet because I regret it, but because people refused to understand it.

== Filmography ==
Year	Title	Director	Writer	Producer	Notes
1957	La cravate	Yes	Yes	Yes	Short film
1968	Fando y Lis	Yes	Yes	No	
1970	El Topo	Yes	Yes	No	Also composer, costume, and production designer
1973	The Holy Mountain	Yes	Yes	Yes	Also composer, costume, and production designer
1980	Tusk	Yes	Yes	No	
1989	Santa Sangre	Yes	Yes	No	
1990	The Rainbow Thief	Yes	No	No	
2013	The Dance of Reality	Yes	Yes	Yes	
2016	Endless Poetry	Yes	Yes	Yes	
2019	Psychomagic, a Healing Art	Yes	Yes	Yes	Documentary

Acting roles

Year	Title	Role	Notes
1957	La cravate	Himself	Short film
1968	Fando y Lis	Puppeteer	
1970	El Topo	El Topo	
1973	The Holy Mountain	The Alchemist	
2002	Cherif	Prophet	
2002	Psicotaxi	Himself	Short film
2003	No Big Deal	Pablo, le père	
2006	Musikanten	Ludwig van Beethoven	
2007	Nothing Is as It Seems	Unnamed character	
2011	The Island	Jodo	
2013	Ritual: A Psychomagic Story	Fernando	
2013	The Dance of Reality	Old Alejandro	
2016	Endless Poetry	Old Alejandro	

Documentary appearances

- Jonathan Ross Presents for One Week Only (1991)
- The Jodorowsky Constellation (1994)
- NWR (2012)
- Jodorowsky's Dune (2013)
- My Life Directed by Nicolas Winding Refn (2015)
- Psychomagic, a Healing Art (2019)

== Bibliography ==
Selected bibliography of comics, novels and non-fiction writings:

=== Graphic novels and comics ===
- The Panic Fables (Spanish: Fabulas panicas; 1967–1970), comic strip published in El Heraldo de México.
- The Eyes of the Cat (1978)
- The Jealous God (1984)
- The Magical Twins (1987)
- Anibal 5 (1990)
- Diosamante (1992)
- Moonface (1992)
- Angel Claws (1994)
- Son of the Gun (1995)
- Madwoman of the Sacred Heart (1998)
- The Shadow's Treasure (1999)
- Bouncer (2001)
- The White Lama (2004)
- Borgia (2004)
- Screaming Planet (2006)
- Le Pape terrible (2009-2019)
- Showman Killer (2010)
- Pietrolino (2013)
- Royal Blood (2014)
- The Son of El Topo (2016–2022)
- Knights of Heliopolis (2017)

=== Jodoverse ===
Beginning with The Incal in 1981, Jodorowsky has co-written and produced a series of linked comics series and graphic novels for the French-language market known colloquially as the Jodoverse. The series was initially developed with Jean Giraud using concepts and designs created for Jodorowky's unfinished Dune project.

- The Incal (1981–1988)
- Before the Incal (1988–1995)
- The Metabarons (1992–2003)
- The Technopriests (1998–2006)
- Megalex (1999–2008)
- After the Incal (2000), incomplete series.
- Metabarons Genesis: Castaka (2007–2013)
- Weapons of the Metabaron (2008)
- Final Incal (2008–2014), revised version of the After the Incal series with new art and text.
- The Metabaron (2015–2018)

=== Fiction ===
Jodorowsky's Spanish-language novels translated into English include:

- Where the Bird Sings Best (1992)
- Albina and the Dog Men (1999)
- The Son of Black Thursday (1999)

=== Non-fiction ===
- El Topo: A Book of the Film (1972)
- Psychomagic (1995)
- The Dance of Reality (2001)
- The Way of Tarot (2004), with Marianne Costa
- The Spiritual Journey (2005)
- The Manual of Psychomagic (2009)
- Metageneaology (2012), with Marianne Costa
- pascALEjandro: Alchemical Androgynous (2017), with Pascale Montandon

== See also ==
- List of atheists in film, radio, television and theater
