= Diego Moldes =

Spanish literary critic (born 1977)

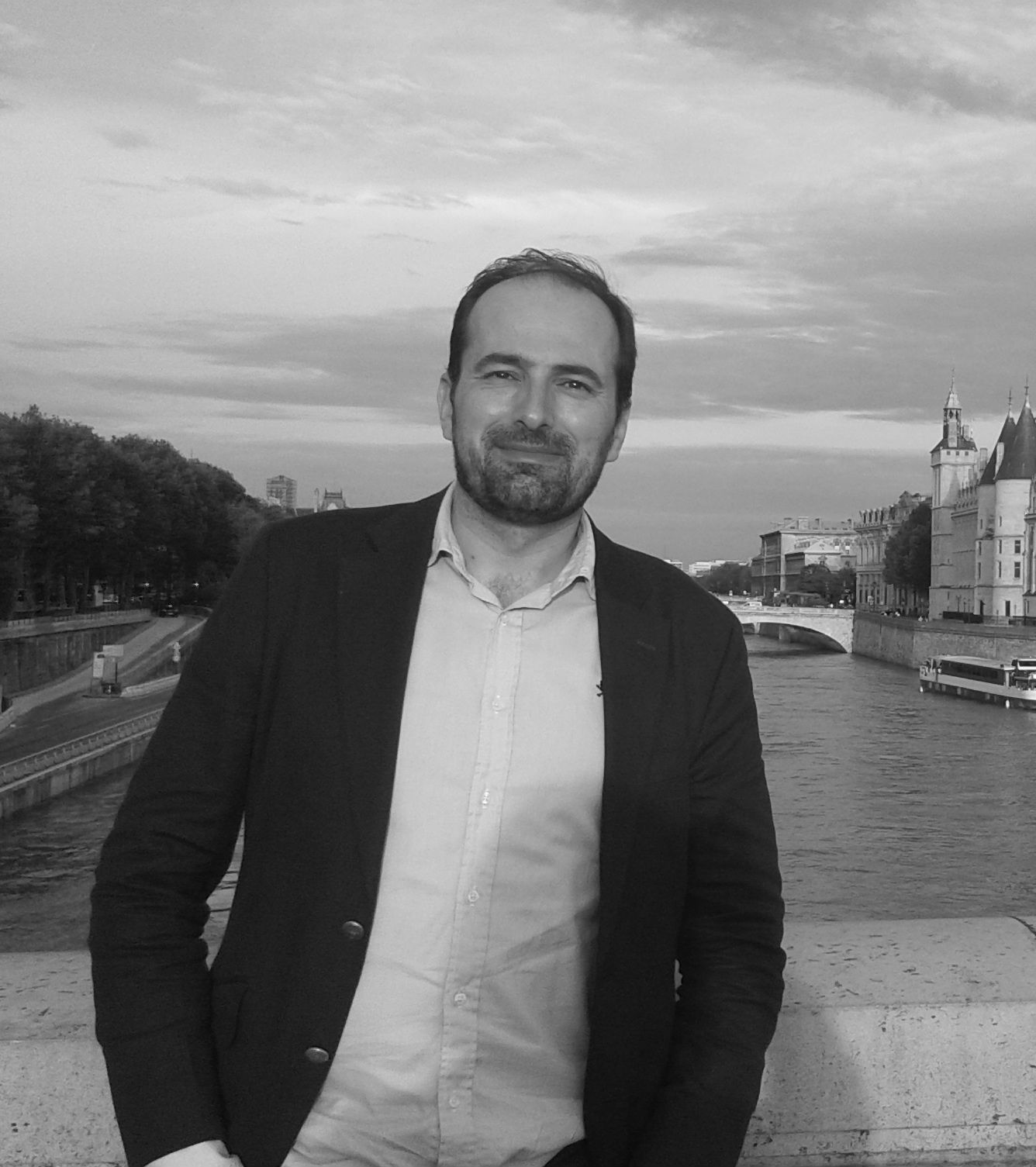
- Born: 27 January 1977 (age 49); Pontevedra, Galicia, Spain
- Education: Complutense University of Madrid, Pontevedra Campus
- Occupations: Film historian, writer, critic
- Writing career
- Genres: Essay, film history, film criticism, narrative
- Website: diegomoldes.com

Diego Moldes González is a Spanish writer, critic and film historian.

== Biography ==
He was born in Pontevedra, Spain.

In November 2019, he published his eleventh book, which is a lengthy work: When Einstein Met Kafka. Contributions of the Jews to the Modern World.

Diego Moldes holds a degree in Advertising and PR from the Faculty of Communication of Pontevedra, a master in publishing from Oxford Brookes University / Publish Editrain, and a PhD in information science (audio-visual communications) from the Complutense University of Madrid.

In 2000, he became a TVG presenter in Galicia: three years later, he moved toward marketing, advertising, and digital content in the cultural field.

In November 2023 he published his first book in the United States, the bilingual poetry collection Ni una poesía sin día - Not a Poem Without a Day (Artepoetica Press Inc., New York).

== Published work ==
=== In English ===
- When Einstein Met Kafka. Jewish Contributions to the Modern World, translated and adapted by Capsuto Steven, Mandel Vilar Press, Simsbury, Connecticut, 2025.644 Pages. ISBN 978-1942134398
- Not a Poem Without a Day, Artepoetica Press Inc., New York, 2023, bilingual collection of poems, 314 pp. ISBN 978-1952336256. Translated by Colleen Terry.

=== Narrative ===
- Daydreaming (Ensoñación, Ediciones Pigmalión, Madrid, 2012), novel.
- Venuspassion (Venuspasión, Notorious Ediciones, Madrid, 2014), essay, narrative, stories and poetry.

=== Poetry ===
- Not One Day Without Poetry (Ni un día sin poesía, Ed. Mueve tu lengua, Madrid, 2018), poems, 200 pp. Foreword by Alejandro Jodorowsky.
- Ni una poesía sin día - Not a Poem Without a Day (Artepoetica Press Inc., New York, 2023), bilingual collection of poems, 314 pp. ISBN 978-1952336256. Translated by Colleen Terry.

=== Essay ===
- When Einstein meet Kafka. Contributions of the Jews to the modern world (Cuando Einstein encontró a Kafka. Contribuciones de los judíos al mundo moderno, Barcelona, Galaxia Gutenberg, 2019). Foreword by Esther Bendahan.
- En el vientre de la ballena. Ensayo sobre la cultura (In the Belly of the Whale. Essay on culture, Barcelona, Galaxia Gutenberg, 2022).
- Antonio de Nebrija y su origen judeoconverso (Antonio de Nebrija and his Judeo-converso origin, Barcelona, Editorial Gedisa, 2023).
- Cornucopia de aforismos. Breviario de Diego Moldes (Guillermo Escolar Ed., 2026). ISBN 979-13-87789-55-8

==== Film books ====
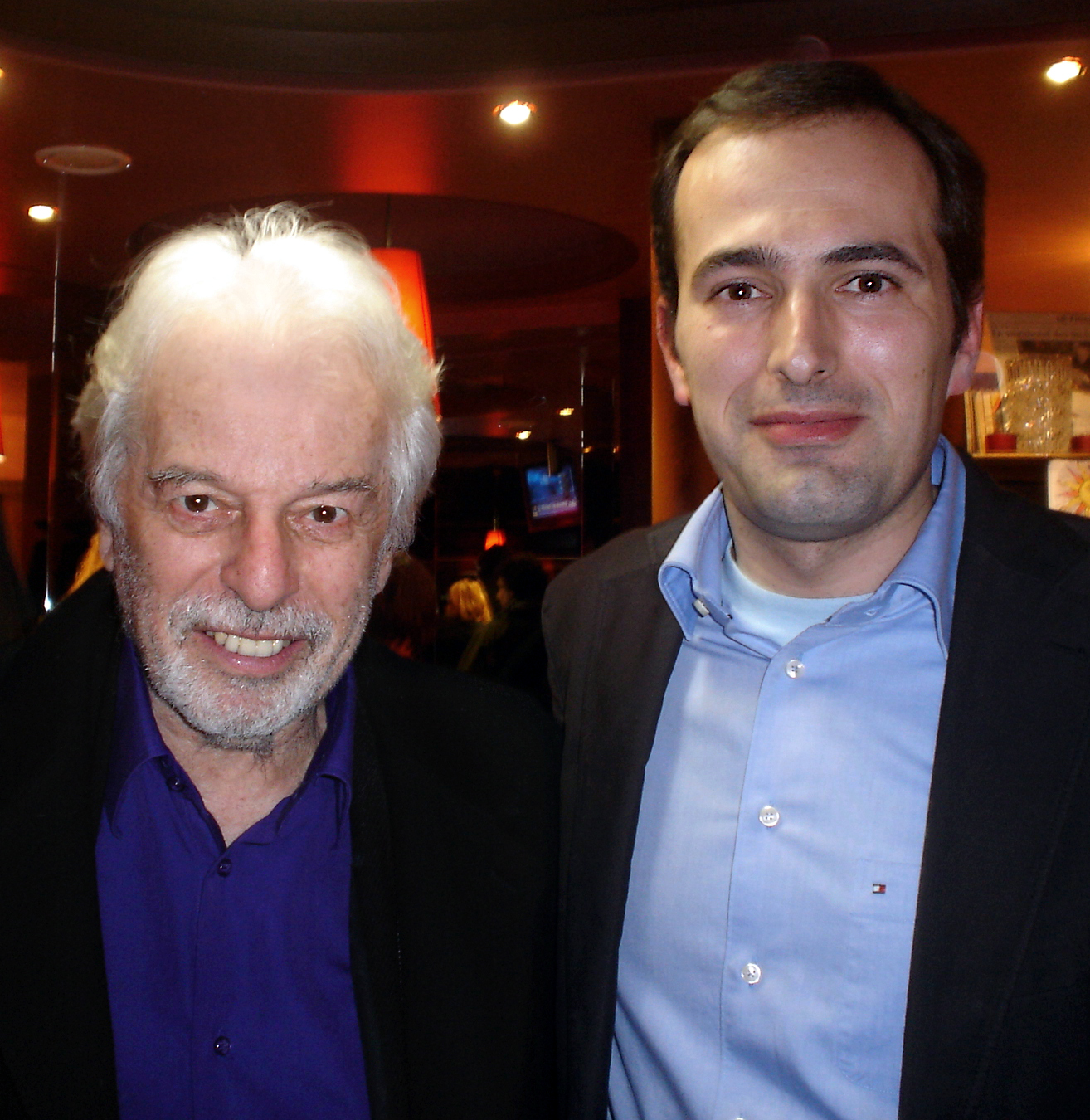
Diego Moldes (right) with Alejandro Jodorowsky

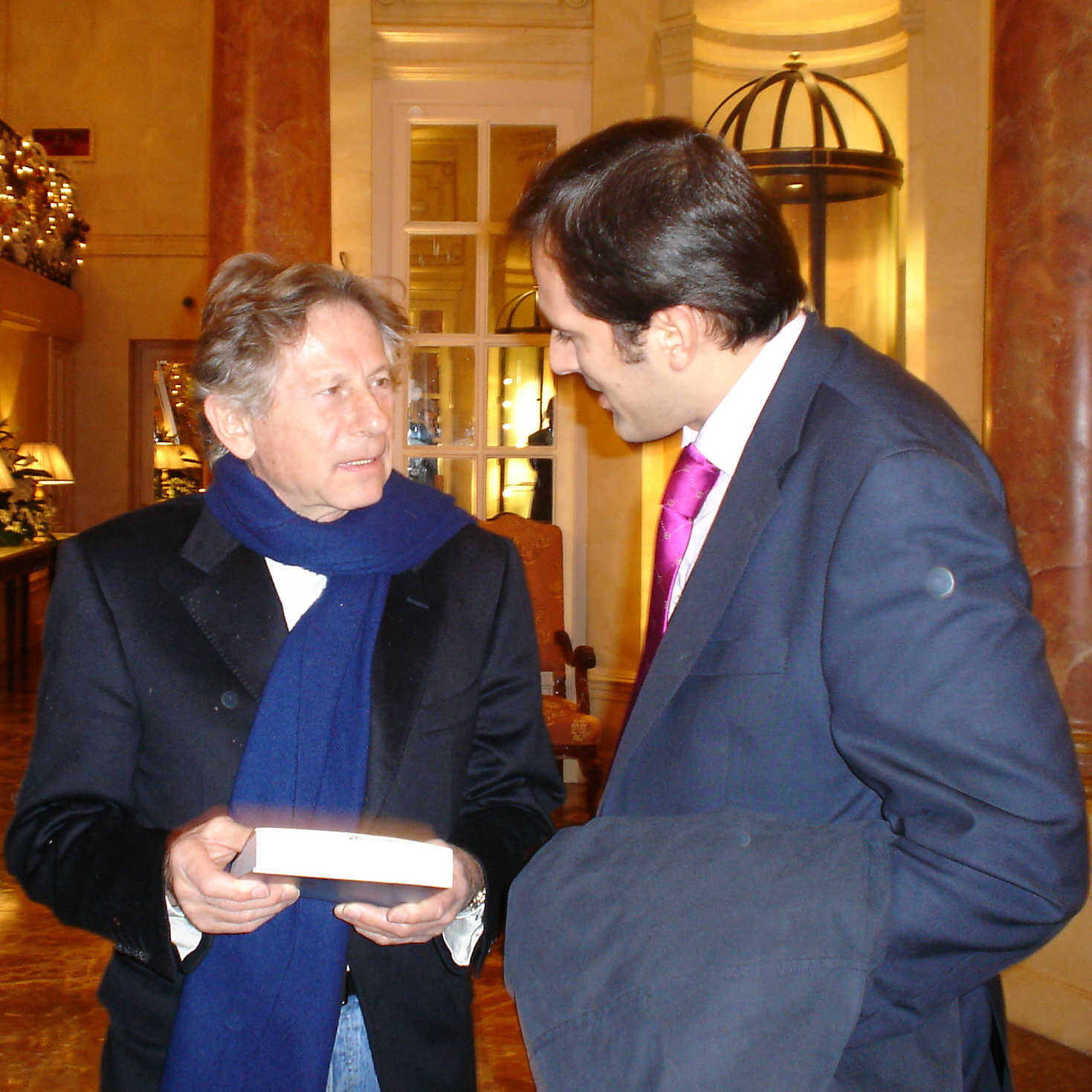
Diego Moldes (right) with Roman Polanski

- Vertigo's footprint (La huella de Vértigo, Ediciones JC, Madrid, 2004). Film Essay on the Influence of Vertigo, by Alfred Hitchcock.
- Roman Polanski. The fantasy of the tormented (Roman Polanski. La fantasía del atormentado, Ediciones JC, Madrid, 2005). Essay.
- European cinema. Great movies (El cine europeo. Las grandes películas. Ediciones JC, Madrid, 2008). Essay on European Sound Cinema (1930-2007).
- The manuscript found in Zaragoza. The novel of Jan Potocki adapted to the cinema by Wojciech Jerzy Has (El manuscrito encontrado en Zaragoza. La novela de Jan Potocki adaptada al cine por Wojciech Jerzy Has, Ediciones Calamar, Madrid, 2009).
- Alejandro Jodorowsky (Col. Signo e Imagen / Cineastas, Ediciones Cátedra, Madrid, 2012). Monographic essay, foreword by A. Jodorowsky, 496 pages.
