= Alma Jodorowsky =

French actress, fashion model and singer (born 1991)

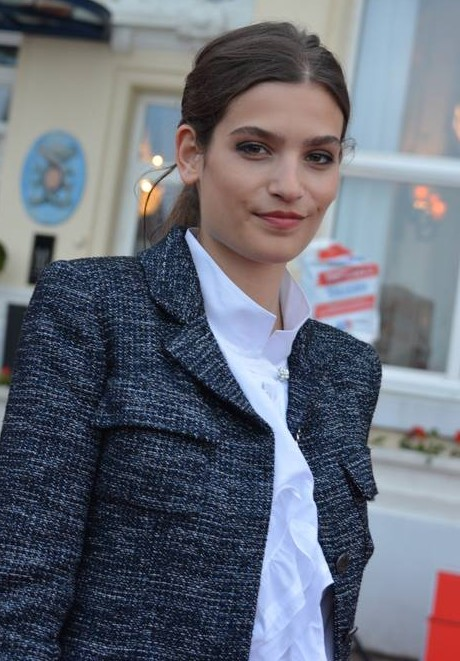
- Jodorowsky at the 2015 Cabourg Film Festival
- Born: 26 September 1991 (age 35); Paris, France
- Occupations: Actress, singer, model
- Parent(s): Brontis Jodorowsky (father); Valérie Crouzet (mother)
- Relatives: Alejandro Jodorowsky (paternal grandfather); Adán Jodorowsky (paternal uncle); Axel Jodorowsky (paternal uncle)

Alma Jodorowsky (born 26 September 1991) is a French actress, singer, and fashion model.

== Early life ==
Alma Jodorowsky was born on 26 September 1991 in Paris. Her father Brontis Jodorowsky is the son of Chilean-French filmmaker Alejandro Jodorowsky.

Jodorowsky attended the Conservatoire Darius Milhaud in Aix-en-Provence and the Studio-théâtre d'Asnières in Paris. 2011 she attended a three months workshop at the New York Film Academy.

== Career ==
Jodorowsky works in television and films, as well as in the fashion industry. She is also the lead vocalist and songwriter of Burning Peacocks, a Paris-based pop band.

=== Acting ===
Jodorowsky's first acting job was at age fourteen in a French TV movie called Gaspard le Bandit, set during the Ancien Régime. She made her big-screen debut as Estelle in the French and American movie Eyes Find Eyes, then in the French comedy Sea, No Sex and Sun.

In 2013, Jodorowsky played a supporting role in Abdellatif Kechiche's romantic drama Blue Is the Warmest Colour, winner of the Palme d'Or at the 2013 Cannes Film Festival. She landed the lead role of Evelyn in 2016 British film Kids in Love.

=== Modelling ===
Jodorowsky has appeared in fashion magazines such as The Coveteur, Vice, Envy magazine, Marie Claire Italy, and Emirates Woman. In 2011, she was the face of New York's new fashion brand Opening Ceremony, starring in several underwear commercial videos. French magazine Snatch chose her on its cover among the thirteen young promises of 2013.

Jodorowsky was selected by Karl Lagerfeld to feature in his Chanel exhibition The Little Black Jacket, held April 2013 in Dubai. She habitually attends Chanel fashion show during the Paris Fashion Week and her personal style garnered attention from the national and international press.

In June 2013, Jodorowsky starred in luxury parisian jeweler Chaumet's campaign video, "Proud To Be Late", in which she wore the new Class One collection of watches. In 2014, she was made Lancôme's brand ambassador.

=== Directing ===
In March 2019, Jodorowsky directed the music video "Saint-Victoire" for the French musician Clara Luciani.

== Filmography ==
Film and Television
Year	Title	Role	Notes
2006	Gaspard le Bandit	Mathilde de Varade	Period TV film
2011	Eyes Find Eyes	Estelle	
2011	Section de recherche	Caroline	Police TV series (1 episode: No.5.3)
2011	Awake to Emptiness	Alma	Short film
2012	Sea, No Sex and Sun	Diane	
2013	Blue Is the Warmest Colour	Béatrice	
2014	La Vie devant elles	Solana	TV series by Gabriel Aghion (6 episodes)
2016	Kids in Love	Evelyn	Ealing Studios
2017	The Starry Sky Above Me	Justyna	
2019	Le Choc du Futur	Ana	
2019	Selfie	Jeanne	
2020	L'ennemi	Maeva	
2021	Threesome	Camille	
2024	Queens of Drama (Les Reines de la drame)	Harmony	
2025	Arco	Iris' mother (voice)	
TBA	Smiley	TBA	
