= The Rainbow Thief =

1990 British film

- Directed by: Alejandro Jodorowsky
- Written by: Berta Domínguez D.
- Produced by: Vincent Winter
- Starring: Peter O'Toole; Omar Sharif
- Cinematography: Ronnie Taylor
- Edited by: Mauro Bonanni
- Music by: Jean Musy
- Distributed by: Rink Anstalt
- Release date: 19 January 1994 (France)
- Running time: 87 minutes
- Country: United Kingdom
- Language: English
- Budget: $10 million

The Rainbow Thief is a 1990 British fantasy drama film directed by Alejandro Jodorowsky and written by Berta Domínguez D. It reunites Lawrence of Arabia co-stars Peter O'Toole and Omar Sharif in a fable of friendship. Christopher Lee also plays a brief role.

== Synopsis ==
Rudolf von Tannen (Christopher Lee) is an eccentric millionaire who cares for no one but his dalmatians. One evening, he gives a dinner party for a number of guests, all of them related to him and hoping to inherit his fortune when he dies. The dogs are fed caviar, while the people are given bones to eat, which sends them away in anger. Then Rudolf's predilect brothel service arrives, the Rainbow Girls, big-breasted women dressed with the colors of the rainbow. After dancing and partying with them, Rudolf has a heart attack that leaves him comatose.

The relatives gather to argue over the will, but since Rudolf is alive but in a coma, nothing can be done. The relatives suspect that Rudolf will leave all of his fortune to his equally eccentric nephew, Meleagre (Peter O'Toole). Meleagre arrives in time to overhear the back-talk, and walks away unnoticed with his dog Chronos.

Five years later, Rudolf is still alive and in a coma, while Meleagre is living in the sewers with a petty thief named Dima (Omar Sharif). Chronos is thought to have died. Together, they wait for Rudolf's demise and a subsequent inheritance. Dima has set to stealing in order to make a living for the two of them and takes advantage of carnivals and traveling circuses in order to do so. He has frequent run-ins with a bartender (Ian Dury), to whom he owes large amounts of money, as well as Ambrosia, a large woman whose love he exploits for money, and several low-life individuals, including a midget, a giant, phony blind beggars.

One night, as he escapes one of his many persecutors, he reads about Rudolf's demise, and sets out to spend his savings in a dinner with Ambrosia. However, upon close inspection of the newspaper, he finds out that Rudolf has left his entire fortune to the Rainbow Girls, as long as they take care of his dogs. Upset, Dima confronts Meleagre, feeling betrayed by him, although Meleagre argues that the fortune he once promised was not money or gold, but paradise and eternity. Outraged, Dima forsakes Meleagre and decides to leave him and the sewers for good by taking a ship to Singapore. But feeling guilty about leaving Meleagre behind, he jumps off the train and hurries back to the sewers, where his friend awaits death with his dog's corpse.

The couple try to find a way out of the flooding sewerlines, but to no avail. They eventually reach a ladder leading upwards, and Dima manages to climb up to safety. Meleagre happily accepts his fate and hurls himself into a strong current that sweeps him away. Dima climbs up and sits catatonic in the middle of the street for hours, shocked.

At the very end, as Dima walks by the docks, he spots a very much alive Chronos swimming in the water. The dog and the thief reunite and walk happily away by the pier, under a rainbow.

== Production notes ==
This was Jodorowsky's sixth feature-length film, and his first British film. Filming was carried out in Gdańsk, Poland. He was frequently threatened by the producers not to change anything in the script, effectively restraining further artistic involvement on his part. Jodorowsky has since disowned the movie.

It was released in cinemas in London (May 1990), Italy (Il Ladro dell'arcobaleno, 1990), France (Le voleur d'arc-en-ciel, Paris, 1994) and, after, Spain (El ladrón del Arco iris, Cine Doré, Madrid, 2011); but it was never released in American cinemas. This movie, along with his previous Tusk in 1980, mark his most impersonal work, set far apart from his earlier films. It was discussed along with his other films in the documentary La Constellation Jodorowsky (1994).
