= Adán Jodorowsky =

French-Mexican musician

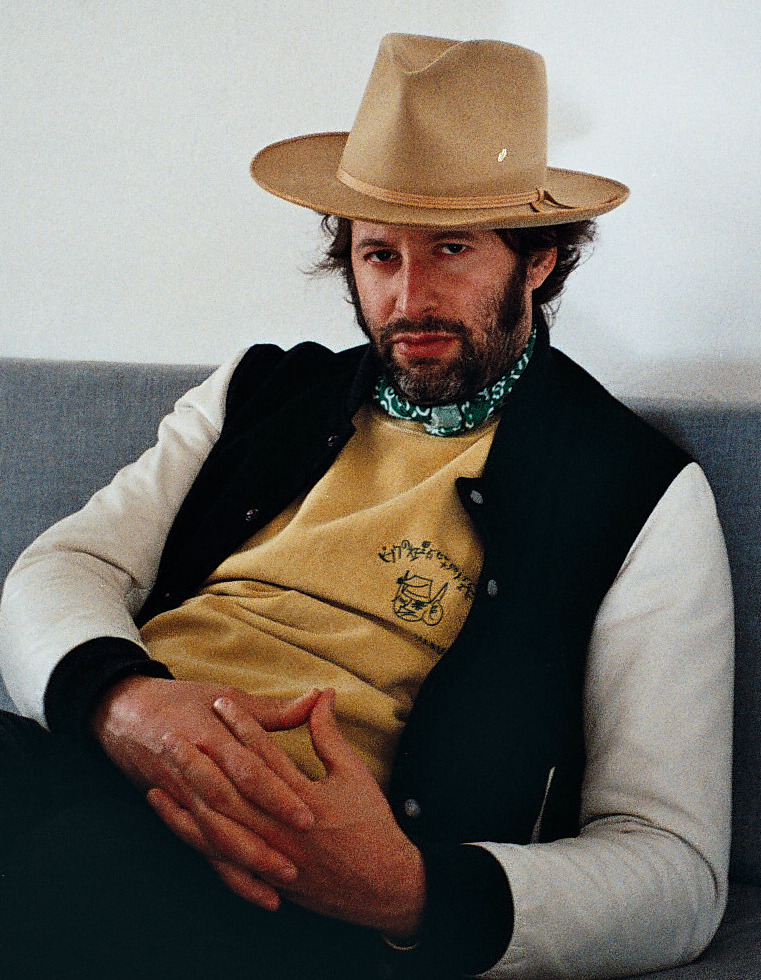
- Jodorowsky in 2017

Background information
- Also known as: Adanowsky
- Born: 29 October 1979 (age 46); Mexico City, Mexico
- Genres: Alternative rock; indie rock; art rock
- Years active: 2006–present
- Members: Adán Jodorowsky (vocals, guitar), Raoul Chichin (guitar) Romain Caillard (keyboards) Tanguy Truhé (drums) Jacques Daoud (background singer and dancer) Joro Adriamiadanarivo (background singer and dancer) Clément Aubert (bass)

Adán Jodorowsky or Adanowsky (born 29 October 1979) is a French-Mexican musician, director and actor.

== Biography ==
Jodorowsky is the son of the Chilean-born French filmmaker Alejandro Jodorowsky and Mexican actress Valérie Trumblay, brother to Brontis Jodorowsky and Axel Jodorowsky and the uncle of Alma Jodorowsky.

He has appeared in seven films to date. As an actor, he won the Saturn Award for Best Performance by a Younger Actor in 1989 for his role as young Fénix in Santa Sangre, one of his father's more renowned films.

On 30 October 2006, he released his first solo album, Étoile Éternelle, as "Adanowsky", and his first single, "L'idole" (meaning "the idol") which was also released in Spanish as "El Ídolo"; the song is about a waiter who wants all the attention and dreams of becoming famous and an idol.

In 2007, he featured as an actor in the Julie Delpy's movie 2 Days In Paris. In 2008, he released his second album, El Ídolo and had a big success in many countries.

In 2011, he released his third solo album Amador and won the UFI award for "Best International Artist Of The Year" and "Best Live Show". Then he met Devendra Banhart, and together, they recorded the song "You are the one" and "Dime Cuándo". He also helped on Alizée's new album, writing a song for her called "La Cándida".

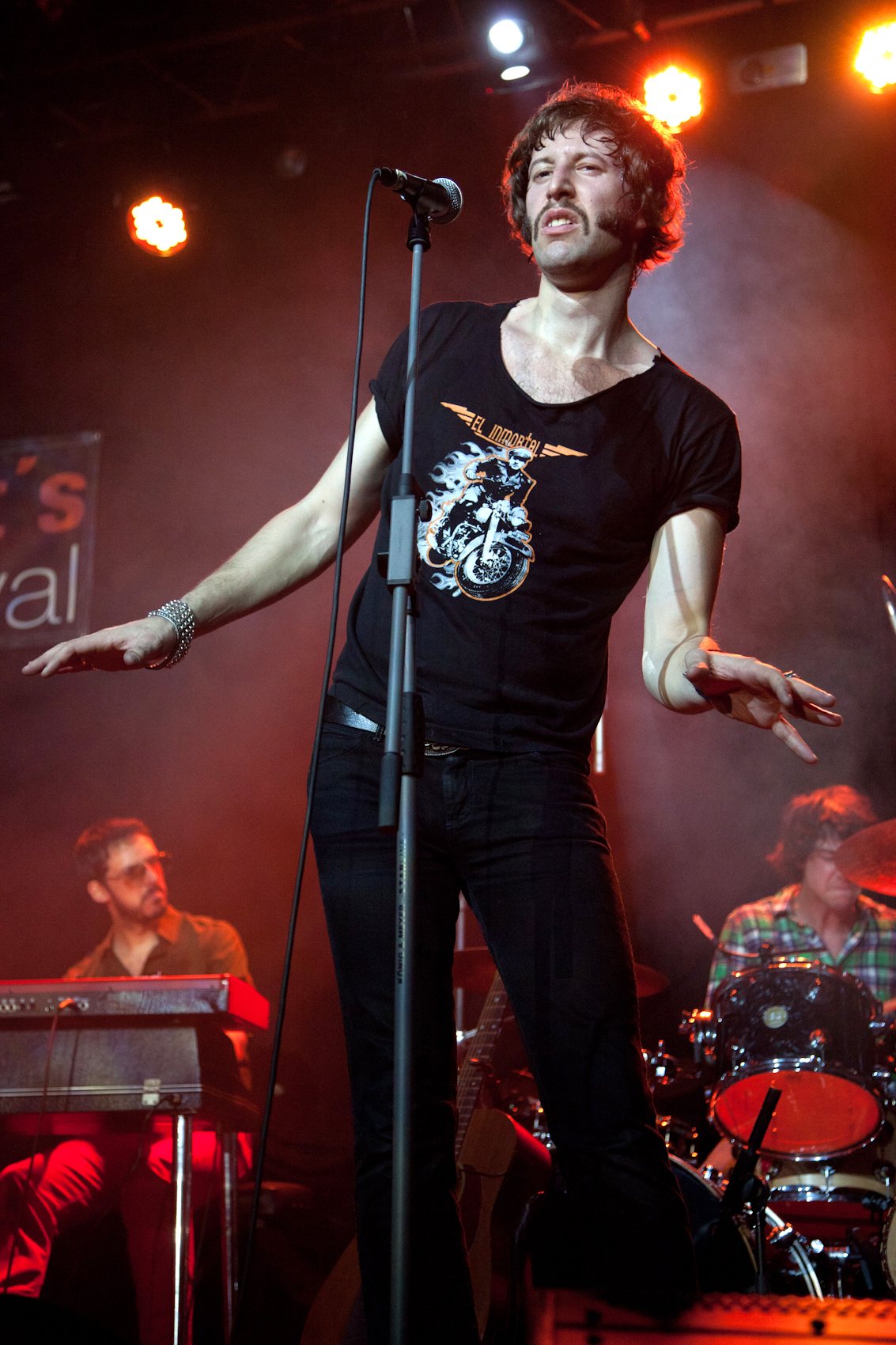
Jodorowsky in 2011

He has composed works such as Echek (2000) and Teou (2001), "The Dance of Reality" as well as directing Echek, Un Sol Con Corazón and El Ídolo, Dancing To The Radio, and the movie The Voice Thief starring himself and Cristóbal Jodorowsky as well as Asia Argento as the lead actress.

In 2012, he produced the first solo (golden) album of León Larregui (lead singer of Mexican band "Zoé").

In 2013, Adán appeared in his father's film The Dance of Reality and composed its soundtrack.

In 2014, he produced and released the Album Ada.

He won five prizes for his movie The Voice Thief as Best Director and Best Movie. Also in 2014 Diane Pernet selected this movie to compete at the ASVOFF festival, the first annual festival in the world about fashion films.

In 2015, Adán Jodorowsky directed a video for his song "Would You Be Mine" with the porn actress Stoya. He is now acting the main character (young Alejandro Jodorowsky) in his father's movie Poesía sin fin, which is the second part of La Danza De La Realidad.

== Filmography ==
| Film | Year | Character |
|---|---|---|
| Endless Poetry | 2016 | Alejandro |
| The Dance of Reality | 2013 | Adan |
| 2 Days in Paris | 2007 | Mathieu |
| Grandes écoles | 2004 | L'étudiant start-up |
| Rien, voilà l'ordre | 2003 | Le présentateur télé |
| Les araignées de la nuit | 2002 | Le truand |
| Les Héros sont debout | 1997 | Le voleur du vidéo-club |
| Santa Sangre | 1989 | Young Fenix |

| As director | Year |
|---|---|
| Echek | 2000 |
| El Idolo | 2006 |
| Don't try to fool me | 2009 |
| Un sol con Corazón | 2010 |
| Me siento solo | 2011 |
| The Voice Thief | 2012 |
| Dancing To The Radio | 2013 |
| Criminal | 2013 |
| Les Huîtres | 2013 |
| Would You Be Mine | 2015 |

== Discography ==
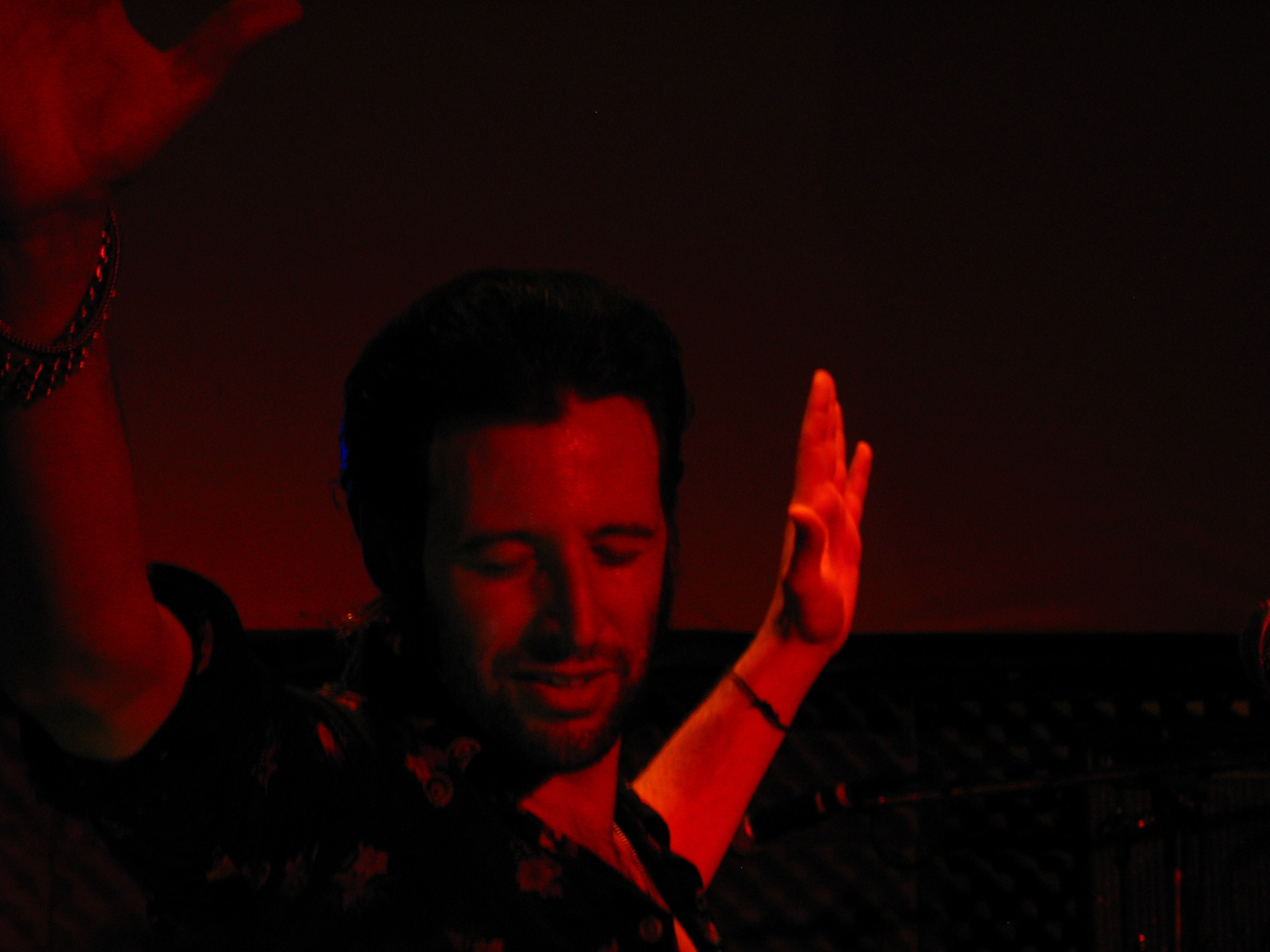
Adanowsky in Buenos Aires, Argentina

| The Hellboys | Year |
|---|---|
| Everything You Learned | 1998 |
| Mutant Love EP | 2005 |
| Mutant Love | 2006 |

| As collaborator | Year |
|---|---|
| Adrienne Pauly | 2006 |

| As producer | Year |
|---|---|
| León Larregui, León Larregui | 2012 |
| Voluma, León Larregui | 2016 |
| Bach, Bandalos Chinos | 2018 |
| De Todas las Flores, Natalia Lafourcade | 2022 |

| Solo | Year |
|---|---|
| Étoile Éternelle | 2006 |
| El ídolo | 2008 |
| Amador | 2010 |
| Ada | 2014 |
| Adan & Xavi y los Imanes | 2016 |
| Esencia Solar | 2018 |

| As film composer | Year |
|---|---|
| Echek | 2000 |
| Teou | 2001 |
| 2 Days in Paris | 2007 |
| The Dance of Reality | 2013 |
| Endless Poetry | 2017 |

== Singles ==
- L'idole (Also released as El Idolo in Spanish)
- Estoy Mal
- No
- Me Siento Solo
- Dancing to the Radio
- Would you be mine
