= Brontis Jodorowsky =

Mexican-French actor and writer

- Born: 27 October 1962 (age 63); Mexico
- Citizenship: Mexico; France
- Occupations: Comedian, actor
- Years active: 1970–present
- Children: Alma Jodorowsky
- Father: Alejandro Jodorowsky
- Relatives: Adán Jodorowsky (brother), Axel Jodorowsky (brother)

Brontis Jodorowsky (born 27 October 1962) is a Mexican-French actor and theatre director.

== Personal life ==
Brontis Jodorowsky was born on 27 October 1962, in Mexico. He is the son of Chilean-French writer, director, and actor Alejandro Jodorowsky and French actress Bernadette Landru.

His daughter, the actress Alma Jodorowsky, was born in France.

== Career ==
Jodorowsky had his first film experience in a prominent role in his father's 1970 film El Topo.

When he was twelve years old, his father cast him in a planned film adaptation of Dune by Frank Herbert. He was trained to play the part of the novel's protagonist, Paul Atreides. He had been taught by Jean-Pierre Vignau, a famous French coach in Japanese jujitsu, karate, judo, aikido, and also knife and sword combat. His training was intensive: 6 hours a day, seven days a week over, a period of two years until the film project was shelved. In the documentary Jodorowsky's Dune, Brontis described the training as painful and merciless.

Jodorowsky received his acting training in Parisian theatres and at the Conservatoire Darius Milhaud du XIVe. In 2011, he attended a three-month workshop at the New York Film Academy and in 2013 graduated from the Studio-théâtre d'Asnières in France.

He also has a career in theatre, directing and performing in numerous plays, most of them in Paris. Many of his works were presented at the Théâtre Du Soleil. He is also known for his Atrides series of plays. (Atreides is both the name of descendants of the Greek mythological figure Atreus and the name of the protagonist family in Frank Herbert's Dune novels).

In 2009, he wrote and directed a play with his father and was also an actor in Le Gorille (The Gorilla), which became one of his better-known pieces.

In the film La Danza De La Realidad (The Dance Of Reality), he had to play the role of his grandfather Jaime, whom he had never known or seen in person, since he died before Brontis was born. Through his father's direction of the film, he discovered much about his father and what he had endured over his lifetime. He reprised the role of Jaime Jodorowsky in the film's sequel, Endless Poetry, which, like La Danza De La Realidad, was also inspired by his father's life experiences, this time focusing on Alejandro's youth and discovery of poetry.

In 2018, Jodorowsky played alchemist Nicolas Flamel in Fantastic Beasts: The Crimes of Grindelwald, his first blockbuster role.

== Theatre ==
=== Plays (as director) ===
- 2000: Le Médecin volant (Molière)
- 2000: Qu’est-ce que ça peut faire (Christian Ferrari)
- 2000: Haute surveillance (Jean Genet)
- 2006: L'Inattendu (Fabrice Melquiot)
- 2009: Pelléas et Mélisande (Maurice Maeterlinck)
- 2009: Le Gorille (Brontis Jodorowsky and Alejandro Jodorowsky)
- 2011: Rigoletto (Verdi)
- 2011: L’Inattendu (Fabrice Melquiot)

=== Plays (as actor) ===
- 1989: La Nuit miraculeuse (Hélène Cixous)
- 1990: Les Atrides: Iphigénie à Aulis (Euripides)
- 1990: Les Atrides: Agamemnon (Aeschylus)
- 1991: Les Atrides: Les Choéphores (Aeschylus)
- 1992: Les Atrides: Les Euménides (Aeschylus)
- 1994: La Ville parjure ou le Réveil des Erinyes (Hélène Cixous)
- 1995: Le Tartuffe (Molière)
- 1995: Anthropologies (Pablo Abad)
- 1995: Pierre et le loup (Sergey Prokofiev)
- 1995: Le Songe d'une nuit d'été (Shakespeare)
- 1995: Macbeth (Shakespeare)
- 1997: Le Bon Dieu de Manhattan (Ingeborg Bachmann)
- 1998: Giacomo le tyrannique (Giuseppe Manfridi)
- 1998: Peines d'amour perdues (Shakespeare)
- 1999: Danser à Lughnasa de (Brian Friel)
- 2000: L’Ultime Chant de Troie (Euripides, Aeschylus, Seneca and Parouir Sévak)
- 2001: Opéra panique (Alejandro Jodorowsky)
- 2001: L’Évangile selon Judas (From The Bible)
- 2001: Mon pauvre Fiedia (Fyodor Dostoevsky)
- 2001: En attendant Godot (Samuel Beckett)
- 2004: Un homme est un homme (Bertolt Brecht)
- 2005: Troïlus et Cressida (Shakespeare)
- 2005: Merlin ou la terre dévastée (Tankred Dorst)
- 2006: Tragedy: a tragedy (Will Eno)
- 2006: La Marquise d'O (Heinrich von Kleist)
- 2009: Le Gorille (Franz Kafka)

== Filmography ==
Year	Title	Role	Notes
1970	El Topo	Hijo (title character's son)	Film by his father, Alejandro Jodorowsky
1971	Pubertinaje		First part only
1974	El muro del silencio	Daniel	
1981	Black Mirror		
1989	Santa Sangre	Orderly 1	Film by his father, Alejandro Jodorowsky
1999	Gialloparma	Fabrizio	
2005	J'ai Vu Tuer Ben Barka	Graphologie expert.	
2007	Le Voyageur De La Toussaint	Docteur Sauvaget	TV movie
2010	A Season Of Jodorowsky	Himself	Documentary. Short.
2012	Táu	Gustavo	
2013	The Dance of Reality	Jaime	Film by his father, Alejandro Jodorowsky
2013	Jodorowsky's Dune	Himself	Documentary about Alejandro Jodorowsky
2015	Anton Tchékhov 1890	Alexandre Tchekhov	
2016	The Darkness	Gustavo	
2016	Endless Poetry	Jaime	Film by his father, Alejandro Jodorowsky
2017	Opus Zero	Zero	
2018	Fantastic Beasts: The Crimes of Grindelwald	Nicolas Flamel	
2025	Magellan	Bispo Juan de Fonseca	

He is also credited in the short film Echek in the "thanks" section.

=== Television series ===
- Largo Winch (2002)

Character: Landis Episode: Flashback

- Section de recherches (2007)

Character: Patrick Venderlen Episode: Vents contraires

=== Voice dub ===
- Matrimoni (1998)

Character: Paolo Sessanelli
