= Frank Pavich =

Film director and producer

Frank Pavich (/ˈpɑːvɪtʃ/ PAHV-itch) is a Croatian-American film director and producer.

== Career ==
Pavich's first film as director was N.Y.H.C., a feature-length documentary about the New York hardcore music scene. The film was shot in the summer of 1995 and was released on VHS in 1999. In 2008, Halo 8 Entertainment released it as part of a special edition two-DVD set.

In 2003, Pavich co-produced the satirical comedy film Die, Mommie, Die!.

From 2011 to 2013, Pavich directed his second documentary, Jodorowsky's Dune. The film premiered in the Director's Fortnight section of the 2013 Cannes Film Festival, and went on to play at many other festivals, including the Telluride Film Festival and the Toronto International Film Festival. At Fantastic Fest, the film won both the Audience Award and Best Documentary prizes. In 2014, the film was released in US theaters by Sony Pictures Classics, and was short listed for an Academy Award for Best Documentary Feature. It currently maintains a rating of 98% on Rotten Tomatoes, making it one of the best-reviewed films that year.

In January 2023, Pavich published an essay in The New York Times related to Jodorowsky's Dune (and more) that involved artwork generated by artificial intelligence (A.I.) programming.

== Filmography ==
Year	Title	Credited	
Year	Title	Director	Producer
1999	N.Y.H.C.	Yes	Yes
2003	Die, Mommie, Die!	No	Yes
2013	Jodorowsky's Dune	Yes	Yes
