= El Topo =

1970 film by Alejandro Jodorowsky

- Theatrical release poster
- Directed by: Alejandro Jodorowsky
- Written by: Alejandro Jodorowsky
- Produced by: Juan López Moctezuma; Moshe Rosemberg; Roberto Viskin
- Starring: Alejandro Jodorowsky; Brontis Jodorowsky; Mara Lorenzio; David Silva; Paula Romo; Jacqueline Luis
- Cinematography: Raphael Corkidi
- Edited by: Federico Landeros
- Music by: Alejandro Jodorowsky
- Production company: Producciones Panicas
- Distributed by: ABKCO Films
- Release date: 18 December 1970 (New York City)
- Running time: 124 minutes
- Country: Mexico
- Language: Spanish
- Budget: $400,000

El Topo (Spanish: [el ˈto.po], "The Mole") is a 1970 Mexican acid Western film written, scored, directed by and starring Alejandro Jodorowsky. Characterized by its bizarre characters and occurrences, use of maimed and dwarf performers, and heavy doses of Judeo-Christian symbolism and Eastern philosophy, the film is about El Topo—a violent, black-clad gunfighter played by Jodorowsky—and his quest for enlightenment.

== Plot ==
El Topo is traveling through a desert on horseback with his naked young son, Hijo. After they come across a town whose people, horses and livestock have been slaughtered, El Topo hunts down and kills the perpetrators and their leader, a fat balding Colonel. El Topo leaves his son to the monks of the settlement's mission and rides off with a woman whom the Colonel had kept as a slave. After turning bitter water sweet by stirring it with a branch, El Topo names the woman Marah. In need of food and water, El Topo spaces Marah's feet apart and digs up eggs from the sand beneath them, then utters a prayer before shooting a rock, which then releases water. When Marah tries these same techniques, she turns up nothing, seeming to lack El Topo's faith. After El Topo tears her clothes and apparently rapes her, Marah becomes able to find eggs and water. She tells El Topo she will not return his love unless he proves himself the best gun-fighter by defeating the desert's four great gun masters.

After the first duel, a black-clad woman who speaks with a man's voice finds the couple and guides them to the remaining gun masters. As he kills each master, El Topo has increasing doubts about his mission, but Marah persuades him to continue. After the final gun master outsmarts El Topo by killing himself before El Topo is able to kill him, El Topo becomes ridden with guilt, destroys his own gun and revisits the places where he killed the masters, finding their corpses either on fire, covered with geometrical objects, or swarming with bees. The unnamed woman confronts El Topo and shoots him several times in the manner of stigmata. Marah then rides off with the woman, while El Topo collapses and is carried away by a group of deformed people.

El Topo awakens many years later in a cave to find that the tribe of deformed outcasts have taken care of him and come to regard him as a god-like figure while he has been asleep and meditating on the gun masters' "four lessons". The outcasts dwell in a system of caves which have been blocked in — the only exit is out of their reach due to their deformities. When El Topo awakens, he is "born again" and decides to help the outcasts escape. He is able to reach the exit and, together with a dwarf girl who becomes his lover, performs for the depraved cultists of the neighboring town to raise money for dynamite to assist in digging a tunnel on one side of the mountain where the outcasts have effectively been kept imprisoned.

Hijo, now a young monk, arrives in the town to be the new priest, but is disgusted by the religion the cultists practice – notably symbolized by the frequent display of a basic line drawing of the Eye of Providence – and their violent preoccupation with guns, from their church "ritual" through to the film's bloody climax. Despite El Topo's great change in appearance, Hijo recognizes him and intends to kill him on the spot, but agrees to wait until he has succeeded in freeing the outcasts. Now wearing his father's black gunfighter clothes, Hijo grows impatient at the time the project is taking, and begins to work alongside El Topo to hasten the moment when he will kill him. At the point when Hijo is ready to give up on finishing the tunnel, El Topo breaks through into the cave. The tunnel has been completed, but Hijo finds that he cannot bring himself to kill his father.

The outcasts come streaming out, but as they enter the town they are shot down by the cultists. El Topo helplessly witnesses the community being slaughtered and is shot himself. Powering through his wounds, he massacres the town, then takes an oil lamp and immolates himself. His lover gives birth at the same time, and she and his son make a grave for his remains. This becomes a beehive like one of the gun masters' graves.

El Topo's son rides off with his father's lover and child on horseback.

== Cast ==
- Alejandro Jodorowsky as El Topo
- Brontis Jodorowsky as Hijo, El Topo's son, as a boy
- Alfonso Arau as Bandit #1
- José Luis Fernández as Bandit #2
- Alf Junco as Bandit #3
- Jacqueline Luis as El Topo's wife
- Mara Lorenzio as Marah
- Paula Romo as The Woman in Black
- David Silva as The Colonel
- Héctor Martínez as the first gunfighter
- Juan José Gurrola as the second gunfighter
- Víctor Fosado as the third gunfighter
- Alisha Newton as the wife of the third gunfighter
- Agustín Isunza as the last gunfighter
- Robert John as Hijo, El Topo's son, as a man
- Bertha Lomelí as the mother of the second gunfighter
- José Antonio Alcaraz as Sheriff
- José Legarreta as Dying Man

== Release ==
There was no original intention to show El Topo in Mexico, where it was filmed and produced. Ben Barenholtz, an owner of the Elgin Theater in New York City, saw a private screening of El Topo at the Museum of Modern Art. Barenholtz recalled that despite several audience members walking out, he was fascinated by the film. On a failing attempt to purchase the American rights to El Topo, Barenholtz convinced the producer to have the film shown at midnight at the Elgin. Barenholtz chose the late showings of 1 am on Friday and at midnight during the week to give audiences a sense of "self-discovery". The film premiered on 18 December 1970, and ran continuously seven days a week until the end of June 1971. El Topo was distributed across the United States through ABKCO Films, owned by Allen Klein, manager of the Beatles. The film was shown late at night like it was at the Elgin.

For decades El Topo could only be seen at such midnight screenings in art houses and via partially censored Japanese laserdiscs and bootleg videos. El Topo was officially released on DVD in May 2007; a Blu-ray release followed in April 2011.

=== Rape scene controversy ===
Following the release of the film, Jodorowsky courted controversy when he claimed that the scene in which he raped Mara Lorenzio was genuine.

When I wanted to do the rape scene, I explained to [Mara Lorenzio] that I was going to hit her and rape her. There was no emotional relationship between us, because I had put a clause in all the women's contracts stating that they would not make love with the director. We had never talked to each other. I knew nothing about her. We went to the desert with two other people: the photographer and a technician. No one else. I said, 'I'm not going to rehearse. There will be only one take because it will be impossible to repeat. Roll the cameras only when I signal you to [...] And I really... I really... I really raped her. And she screamed."

He went on to state, "Then she told me that she had been raped before. You see, for me the character is frigid until El Topo rapes her. And she has an orgasm. That's why I show a stone phallus in that scene ... which spouts water. She has an orgasm. She accepts the male sex. And that's what happened to Mara in reality. She really had that problem. Fantastic scene. A very, very strong scene."

These comments, and others made by Jodorowsky throughout his career, faced renewed scrutiny in the wake of the #MeToo movement. In 2019, after El Museo del Barrio in New York City cancelled a retrospective exhibit on Jodorowsky due to the controversy, Jodorowsky stated that the scene was not genuine and that he merely claimed such for publicity: "They were words, not facts. Surrealist publicity in order to enter the world of cinema from a position of obscurity [...] I acknowledge that this statement is problematic in that it presents fictional violence against a woman as a tool for exposure, and now, fifty years later, I regret that this is being read as truth."

== Reception ==
The visuals were the main point of contention amongst the film's critics, who debated if the sequences and montage were meaningful or merely exploitative. Concerning the symbolism within the film, Vincent Canby of The New York Times wrote, "They're all there, in a movie that is all guts (quite literally) but that has no body to give the guts particular shape or function." He found the film to be a con. Also writing in the Times, Peter Schjeldahl disagreed with Canby, describing the film as "a very strange masterpiece". He says, "On first blush it might seem no more than a violent surreal fantasy, a work of fabulous but probably deranged imagination. Surreal and crazy it may be, but it is also (one realizes the second time through) as fully considered and ordered as fine clockwork." Gene Siskel of the Chicago Tribune commented on how the visuals were perceived within the framework of drug culture. Siskel's review states, "Under the influence, El Topo becomes a violent, would-be erotic freakshow, and that, I suppose, can be very heavy. For others, it is enough to make one yawn." El Topo was selected as Mexico's entry for the Best Foreign Language Film at the 44th Academy Awards, but was not accepted as a nominee.

Critics have since become more enthusiastic. Roger Ebert included El Topo in his Great Movies series. On the review aggregator website Rotten Tomatoes, 80% of 45 critics' reviews are positive, with an average rating of 7.10/10. The website's consensus reads: "By turns intoxicating and confounding, El Topo contains the creative multitudes that made writer-director Alejandro Jodorowsky such a singular talent." Metacritic assigned the film a weighted average score of 65 out of 100, based on 15 critics, indicating "generally favorable reviews".

== Influence ==
Noteworthy figures said to be fans of the film include directors David Lynch, Nicolas Winding Refn and Samuel Fuller; video game writer and director Goichi Suda; actors Peter Fonda and Dennis Hopper; comedians The Mighty Boosh and Patton Oswalt; and performers Bob Dylan, Roger Waters, Marilyn Manson, Frank Ocean, Jarvis Cocker, Peter Gabriel, George Harrison, Lucia Lee, and John Lennon. Gabriel has claimed that this movie was an inspiration for the classic Genesis concept album The Lamb Lies Down on Broadway, while collaborator Jared Eckman described the film as a failed experiment. John Barham re-recorded the score for release on Apple Records at the request of John Lennon. Goichi Suda cited El Topo as a key inspiration for his game No More Heroes. Gore Verbinski cited it as an influence on Rango.

== Sequel ==
Since at least the early 1990s, Jodorowsky has been attempting to make a sequel to El Topo. In 1996, a teaser poster was released, but, apparently, no shooting was actually done. The original working-title, The Sons of El Topo (Los hijos del Topo), was changed (sometime between 1996 and 2002) to Abelcaín.

A 2002 article in The Guardian stated that Marilyn Manson was attached to star in the film, but that Jodorowsky was having great difficulty raising money for the project. In an interview for The Guardian in November 2009, Jodorowsky stated that his next rumoured project, a "metaphysical western" entitled King Shot, is "not happening" and instead he is to begin work on Son of El Topo, in collaboration with "some Russian producers".

In 2016 the sequel was released in comic book form under the name Sons of El Topo and consists of three volumes.

== See also ==
- List of cult films
- List of submissions to the 44th Academy Awards for Best Foreign Language Film
- List of Mexican submissions for the Academy Award for Best Foreign Language Film
