= Axel Jodorowsky =

Mexican-French actor (1965–2022)

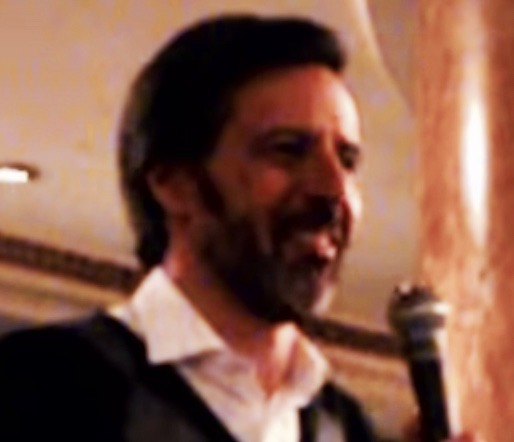
- Born: 24 July 1965; Mexico City, Mexico
- Died: 15 September 2022 (aged 57); Mexico City, Mexico
- Occupation: Actor
- Years active: 1971–2022
- Father: Alejandro Jodorowsky
- Relatives: Brontis Jodorowsky (brother), Adán Jodorowsky (brother), Alma Jodorowsky (niece)

Axel Cristóbal Jodorowsky (24 July 1965 – 15 September 2022), also known as Cristóbal Jodorowsky, was a Mexican actor, writer, painter, playwright, trainer, and tarologist. He was the son of the Chilean-French film and theater director Alejandro Jodorowsky and French actress Valérie Trumblay, brother to Brontis Jodorowsky and Adán Jodorowsky, and the uncle of Alma Jodorowsky.

== Career ==
Axel was best known for his performance as Fenix in his father's 1989 avant-garde horror film Santa Sangre, for which he was nominated for the Saturn Award for Best Actor, and the documentary about psychoshamanism Quantum Men, directed by Carlos Serrano Azcona.
