= The Mansion of Madness =

1973 film by Juan López Moctezuma

- Promotional sales poster
- Directed by: Juan López Moctezuma
- Written by: Carlos Illescas; Juan López Moctezuma; Gabriel Weisz
- Based on: "The System of Doctor Tarr and Professor Fether" (1845 story) by Edgar Allan Poe
- Produced by: Roberto Viskin
- Starring: Claudio Brook; Arthur Hansel; Ellen Sherman; Martin LaSalle
- Cinematography: Rafael Corkidi
- Edited by: Federico Landeros
- Music by: Nacho Méndez
- Production company: Producciones Prisma
- Release date: 10 August 1973
- Running time: 84 minutes
- Country: Mexico
- Language: English (Note: Though shot in English, the film was dubbed in Spanish for its Mexican release.)

The Mansion of Madness (Spanish: La mansión de la locura, also released as Dr. Tarr's Torture Dungeon [US] and House of Madness [UK]) is a 1973 Mexican horror film co-written and directed by Juan López Moctezuma, in his feature directorial debut, and starring Claudio Brook, Arthur Hansel, Ellen Sherman, and Martin LaSalle. It is loosely based on Edgar Allan Poe's 1845 short story "The System of Doctor Tarr and Professor Fether". Surrealist artist Leonora Carrington supervised sets and costumes.

Set in 19th-century France, the film follows a journalist visiting a rural insane asylum in which he uncovers that the inmates have taken over the doctors and staff, and implemented a series of gruesome treatments.

== Plot ==
In 19th-century France, journalist Gaston LeBlanc visits a sprawling, remote psychiatric hospital in the mountains where a Dr. Maillard has purportedly invented revolutionary treatments for the mentally ill. Driven by carriage, Gaston is accompanied by his old friend Julien Couvier and Julien's cousin Blanche, and coach driver Henri. Julien, Blanche and Henri depart after being confronted by several aggressive, bizarre guards at the hospital's gated entrance, which terrifies Blanche.

Gaston meets Dr. Maillard and his beautiful niece, Eugénie. Gaston quickly observes that under Maillard's "soothing system" the patients of the hospital appear to roam free, acting in maniacal and at times violent ways, as well as engaging in religious cult-like activities, which Maillard encourages. Meanwhile, the carriage carrying Julien and Blanche is attacked by a gang of men who overwhelm the driver Henri, causing Julien and Blanche to flee into the woods on foot. Blanche is caught and brutally raped, and Julien is also captured and tortured by the men, but he eventually escapes, wandering the woods still tied up.

During his first night at the asylum Gaston has a hallucinatory dream and later accuses Maillard of being an imposter, abusing his patients as well as controlling Eugénie. Maillard responds that, despite her calm appearance, Eugénie is far more dangerous and violent than she appears. As Gaston observes the increasingly eccentric methods of Maillard's "soothing system", he begins to question the mental stability of the doctor. In the doctor's dungeon, innocent people are chained, tortured and stuck in glass cages, then forced to take part in gruesome games of ritual slaughter. Gaston escapes his quarters to search for Eugénie, who he witnessed taken away by guards into the woods. He finds and rescues her, discovering Julien along the way; however they are eventually all captured again by Maillard's guards. Julien finds Eugénie's father, the real Dr. Maillard, imprisoned with the driver Henri. The false "Maillard" is actually Raoul Fragonard, an inmate of the hospital who led a revolt and has imprisoned the staff and guards, replacing and impersonating them himself and his followers.

Fragonard organizes a ritualized Dionysian cult-like gathering with himself as the ringleader, where Gaston and Eugénie are sentenced to be executed by fire. Just before this happens, the original staff, including the real Maillard and Julien escape the prison and attack just moments prior to Gaston's execution. The escaped prisoners, led by the real Maillard take back control of the hospital. Fragonard is shot dead by Blanche, who declares "Viva la revolución" before killing him. Gaston, along with Julien and Blanche depart the asylum in the carriage they arrived in.

== Cast ==
- Claudio Brook as Dr. Maillard / Raoul Fragonard
- Arthur Hansel as Gaston LeBlanc
- Ellen Sherman as Eugénie
- Martin LaSalle as Julien Couvier
- David Silva as the Priest
- Susana Kamini as the Priestess
- Mónica Serna as Blanche
- Max Kerlow as the real Dr. Maillard
- Pancho Córdova as the Marshal
- Jorge Bekris as Henri

== Analysis ==
Film scholar Doyle Greene cites The Mansion of Madness along with Moctezuma's Alucarda (1977) as "ground-breaking" for its blending of stylistic elements of classical horror with more contemporary surrealist and experimental visuals.

== Production ==
Surrealist artist Leonora Carrington supervised sets and costumes with one of her sons, Gabriel Weisz. The repeated appearance of a white horse, Carrington’s alter ego, and the elaborate surreal feasts and costumes, have been credited as demonstrating the artist’s vision and several of her recurring motifs. The film's producer, Roberto Viskin, has previously produced Alejandro Jodorowsky's surrealist film El Topo (1970), which Moctezuma had co-produced. Several other cast and crew from El Topo also worked on the film.

The film was shot almost entirely in Mexico City (the wilderness scenes were filmed at Desierto de los Leones National Park) and at Estudios América (now Azteca Estudios).

== Release ==
The film premiered in Mexico and at the Locarno Film Festival on 10 August 1973.

=== Home media ===
Mondo Macabro released the film on DVD in 2005. In February 2025, Vinegar Syndrome released the film on Blu-ray, featuring a 4K restoration sourced from the original film elements.

== Reception ==
=== Critical response ===
Scream magazine reviewed The Mansions of Madness in 2016, writing that "if you manage to see beyond its jarring shortcomings, you will be treated to a film that is not only visually stunning, but which also leaves you with a frisson of disturbing melancholy that will haunt you for days to come." In a review of the Mondo Macabro release, DVD Talk noted that "Mondo Macabro's package text does its best to hype the film, which is described as "Like a Monty Python film directed by Fellini ... on acid!" It's an impressive movie, even though it doesn't quite live up to that claim."

Film director Roman Polanski cited this film's influence on The Tenant (1976).

=== Accolades ===
The Mansion of Madness won the Laceno d'oro prize and a Special Mention for Claudio Brook's performance at the XIV Avellino Neorealist and Avant-garde Film Festival, Italy; a Special Mention at the Brave New World Festival in Belgrade, Yugoslavia (1973); it was also awarded a Special Mention at the Locarno Festival, Switzerland (1973), and a Gold Medal at the Paris International Fantastic Film and Science Fiction Festival (1974).

== Sources ==
- Greene, Doyle (2015). Mexploitation Cinema: A Critical History of Mexican Vampire, Wrestler, Ape-Man and Similar Films, 1957-1977. Jefferson, North Carolina & London: McFarland. p. 168. ISBN 978-1-476-60072-7.
- Strayer, Kirsten; Och, Dana (2014). Transnational Horror Across Visual Media: Fragmented Bodies. New York: Routledge. pp. 115–120. ISBN 978-0-415-82124-7.
