= The Impossible Years =

1965 play by Robert Fisher and Arthur Marx

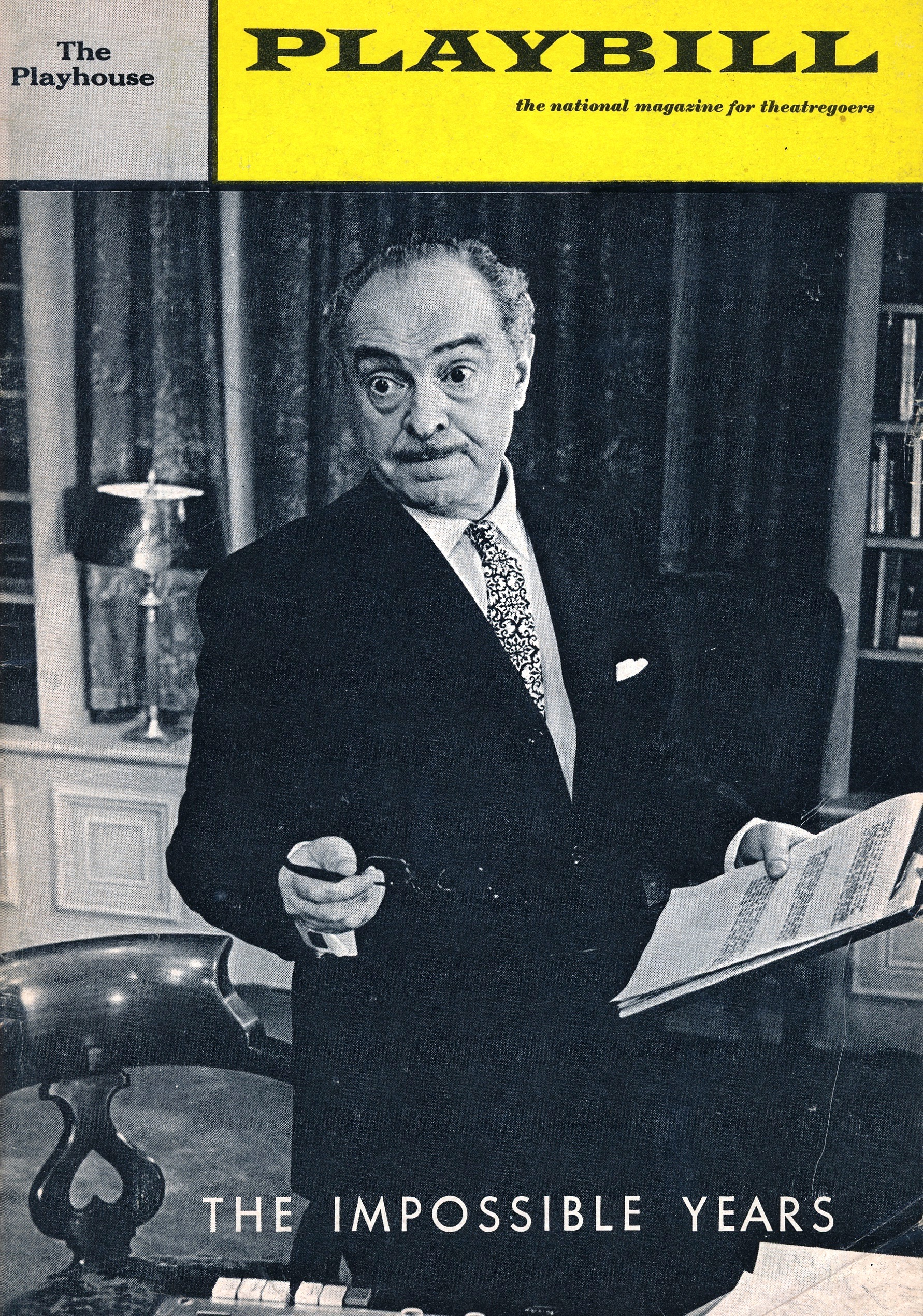
Sam Levene in The Impossible Years, 1966 Playbill cover, Playhouse Theatre, original Broadway production

The Impossible Years is a 1965 comedy play written by Robert Fisher and Arthur Marx, son of comedian Groucho Marx. After two previews, the Broadway production, directed by Arthur Storch, opened on October 13, 1965, at the Playhouse Theatre, where it ran for 670 performances. The original cast included Alan King, Sudie Bond, Bert Convy, Neva Small, and Scott Glenn. Ed McMahon temporarily assumed the role of Dr. Jack Kingsley for eight performances from January 17, 1966, to January 22, 1966, so Alan King could honor a previously scheduled Miami night club engagement.

On August 22, 1966, Sam Levene replaced Alan King in the starring role of Dr. Jack Kingsley, a psychiatrist, in the Broadway production of The Impossible Years, performing the role for 322 performances until the show closed May 27, 1967 at the Playhouse Theatre.

After the Broadway production closed, Sam Levene starred in the first U.S. national company production of The Impossible Years and performed the hit comedy for the duration of 1967 until March 10, 1968, when the production closed at the Morris A. Mechanic Theatre in Baltimore, Maryland. National tour stops included performances at the Mineola Theatre on Long Island; the Paper Mill Playhouse in Milburn, New Jersey; The Playhouse Theater in Wilmington, Delaware; the Royal Alexandria Theatre in Toronto, Canada; Detroit, Michigan; the Shubert Theatre in Cincinnati, Ohio; and The National Theatre in Washington, D.C.

== Plot ==
The comedy revolves around Jonathan Kingsley, a teaching psychiatrist at the local university, his wife, and their two teenage daughters. Complications arise when the older one develops an active interest in the opposite sex, and her younger, impressionable sister begins to emulate her .

== Adaptations ==
Film

The play was adapted into a 1968 film of the same name starring David Niven, Lola Albright, Chad Everett, and Cristina Ferrare. Directed by Michael Gordon, the screenplay was written by George Wells

TV movie
In 1970, it was reported Jackie Cooper and Bob Finkel had written a pilot script for a TV adaptation of the play for NBC.
