= Mary, Mary, Bloody Mary =

1975 film directed by Juan López Moctezuma

- U.S. theatrical poster
- Directed by: Juan López Moctezuma
- Screenplay by: Malcolm Marmorstein
- Story by: Don Henderson; Don Rico
- Produced by: Henri Bollinger; Robert Yamin
- Starring: Cristina Ferrare; David Young; John Carradine; Helena Rojo; Arthur Hansel; Enrique Lucero; John Carradine
- Cinematography: Miguel Garzón
- Edited by: Federico Landeros
- Production companies: Translor Films; Proa Films; Cinema Management Inc.
- Distributed by: Proa Films (Mexico); Black Lion (U.S.)
- Release dates: May 2, 1975 (Chicago); October 29, 1975 (Los Angeles)
- Running time: 101 minutes
- Countries: Mexico; United States
- Language: English

Mary, Mary, Bloody Mary is a 1975 slasher film directed by Juan López Moctezuma from a screenplay by Malcolm Marmorstein, and starring Cristina Ferrare, David Young, Helena Rojo, Arthur Hansel, Enrique Lucero and John Carradine. Its plot follows an American artist (Ferrare) who begins killing and drinking the blood of locals in a Mexican village.

== Plot ==
American bisexual artist Mary Gilmore's van breaks down during a thunderstorm in rural Mexico. She finds an abandoned house nearby, occupied by a vagrant named Ben. He offers to spend the night there with her, to which she agrees. In the house, Mary reminisces to herself about murdering a United States Embassy employee she seduced the night before and drinking his blood. Federal Bureau of Investigation inspector Otis Cosgrove and Lieutenant Eduardo Pons begin investigating the murder, and subsequently uncover a series of similar crimes in which victims were drugged and drained of their blood.

Meanwhile in Mexico, Ben repairs Mary's van and the two spend the day at the beach. While Ben goes to buy fish Mary drugs a middle-aged fisherman with coffee before stabbing him and drinking his blood. Back at Mary's home, she shows Ben a painting she completed of her father, who she says died when she was young. That night in the morgue a masked man breaks in to view the fisherman's body and stabs a morgue employee to death in the process. Back at Mary's home, art dealers Greta and Arnold Jenson, view her artwork. After Mary's art show that night Greta invites her to her home and attempts to seduce her. While she runs a bath for Mary, Mary drugs Greta's tequila. When Greta kisses her, Mary stabs her throat.

The following day, Cosgrove and Pons question Ben and Mary about Greta's murder and accuse Ben when he fails to supply an alibi. Meanwhile, a young girl hitches a ride with the masked man who broke into the morgue. When he attacks her, she jumps from the car and flees into the woods, but is ultimately stabbed to death by the man, who reveals himself to be Mary's father. Upon reading of the girl's murder, Mary is unnerved as it seems another vampire is abroad. Mary's father begins to harass her, calling her home and attempting to run her over with his car.

Later at a party attended by Mary and Ben, Mary's father murders a young dancer and disguises himself in his costume. He attempts to kidnap Mary from the party, but she flees to a nearby cemetery where her father murders a gravedigger before escaping. Convinced Ben is responsible, Cosgrove and Pons stake out Mary's house. Mary and Ben leave and are followed by her father in a separate car. As they enter the woods Mary drugs Ben's coffee before dragging his unconscious body into the woods. Mary's father attempts to force Cosgrove's car off the road resulting in a collision. As Cosgrove attempts to exit his car Mary's father stabs him to death.

Mary, about to slash Ben's throat, stops when she hears the wreckage and witnesses her father feeding on Cosgrove. He explains to Mary that his hunger has driven him mad, removes his mask to show half his face has rotted away, and informs her this is her fate being a vampire and the only cure is death. Meanwhile Ben regains consciousness and attacks Mary's father, ultimately shooting him with Cosgrove's gun. Mary begins drinking her father's blood before stabbing Ben and feeding on him. Later at the police station Pons accepts Mary's account of the masked killer, her father, being responsible for Ben's death. She tells him she plans to leave Mexico and travel before driving away in her van.

== Cast ==
- Cristina Ferrare as Mary Gilmore
- David Young as Ben Ryder
- John Carradine as The Man
- Helena Rojo as Greta
- Arthur Hansel as FBI Agent Otis Cosgrove
- Enrique Lucero as PF Lt. Eduardo Pons
- Roger Cudney as Howard Miller
- Susana Kamini as Hitchhiker
- Ramón Armengod as Dr. Salazar
- Carlos Riquelme as Arnold Jenson

== Production ==
In April 1974 it was reported that John Carradine had signed on to appear in the film with Cristina Ferrare and David Young in what was described as "a mystery set in Hollywood circa 1948." By the time the film was made, the script was changed to be set in then-contemporary Mexico. The film was a co-production between Mexican film company Proa and American producers Henri Bollinger and Robert Yamin. Shooting took place on-location in Tepoztlán, Mexico City, Toluca, and Veracruz.

== Release ==
Mary, Mary, Bloody Mary was released in Chicago on May 2, 1975, and later opened in Los Angeles on October 29, 1975.

=== Home media ===
Code Red released the film on Blu-ray in 2014. VCI Entertainment issued a double-feature Blu-ray in June 2022 which also features Blood Feast (1972).
