= Vincent Woodthorpe =

Vincent Woodthorpe (c. 1764–1822) was an English artist who produced exaggerated illustrations of Australia for two publications on New South Wales, especially of the animals and landscapes at the new colonies. Other than some illustration and engraving work in other publications, few details of his life are known.

He died on 22 September 1822 in London.

== Works ==
The two most well known works are his illustrations to An account of voyage to New South Wales and a History of the same region, both books were assembled by the raconteur George Barrington. Woodthorpe's plates provided the books with "cleverly fanciful" depictions of novel animals of Australia.
