= China Machado =

Chinese-American fashion model (1929 - 2016)

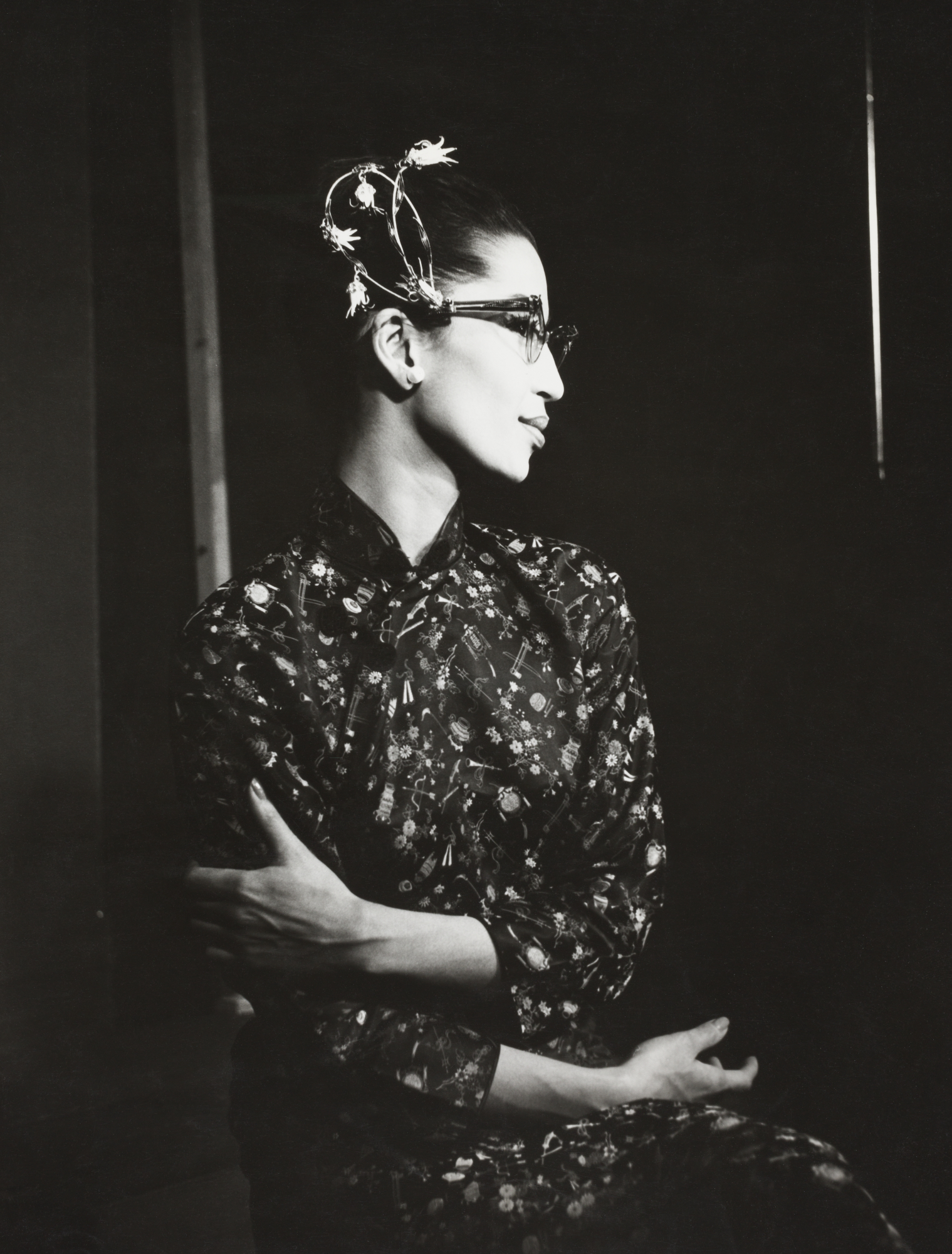
- Machado in 1962.
- Born: Noelie da Souza Machado; 25 December 1929; Shanghai, China
- Died: 18 December 2016 (aged 86); Stony Brook, New York, U.S.
- Occupations: Fashion model, editor
- Spouses: Martin LaSalle (m. 1957; div. 1965); Riccardo Rosa
- Children: 2

Noelie da Souza Machado (25 December 1929 – 18 December 2016), known as China Machado, was a Chinese-born American fashion model, editor, and television producer. She was the first model of color to appear in a major American fashion magazine, in the February 1959 issue of Harper’s Bazaar.

== Early life and career ==
Noelie da Souza Machado was born in Shanghai, China to a Portuguese father from Macau and a Chinese mother. Her maternal grandmother was from Goa. Her parents met in Hong Kong. She spent the early portion of her life learning how to cook, sew, knit, and crochet. After World War II, her family traveled to Argentina, Peru and Spain. At the age of 19, she met the Spanish bullfighter, Luis Miguel Dominguín. When the relationship ended, Machado moved to Paris and found work modelling for Hubert de Givenchy.

According to Machado, she was asked to model for Balenciaga, but he was out of town, so they sent her to Givenchy instead.

They thought I was filling-in for a sick girl, so they grabbed me, put me in clothes, and threw me into the room where they were showing the collection. I barely knew anything about walking like a model, so I just copied the girl in front of me. At the end of the show, gorgeous Givenchy comes up to me and says, "Would you like to be in the cabine?" — that's what they called the group of models who worked for the house. That’s how it all started.

She later worked for Oleg Cassini and Balenciaga. She worked for Givenchy for three years and during this time, she became the highest-paid runway model in Europe, earning $1,000 a day.

In 1957, she married the actor Martin LaSalle, the son of a diplomat, and a student of political science at the Sorbonne, whom she met in Paris. Nonetheless, for a year during their courtship, she left him for the Oscar-winning actor William Holden, returning to LaSalle to marry him. The couple eventually settled in New York City where Machado met Diana Vreeland and through Vreeland, Richard Avedon, with whom she developed a very close friendship and called a "great mentor in her life". Machado and LaSalle had two daughters, Blanche and Emmanuelle. They divorced in 1965, after Machado had an affair with a friend of her husband's. Avedon declared that she was "probably the most beautiful woman in the world." His photographs of her were the ones used in the February 1959 issue of Harper's Bazaar.

It was 1958, and the publishers were saying, "We can't put this girl in the magazine. Everyone in the South will quit subscriptions and no one will want to advertise with us!" But they were published in February 1959, because — and I only found this out 20 years later—Dick had threatened to quit [his contract] if they didn't use them!

Machado worked for Avedon exclusively for three years before he got her a job as Harper's Bazaar's Senior Fashion Editor where, eventually, she became the Fashion Director and ventured into other endeavors in publishing, fashion, and television. In 1989, she was added to the International Best Dressed List.

In 1991 she opened a gallery in Watermill, New York, when she left the fashion industry. Among the photographers who exhibited in the gallery were Hiro, Avedon, Lillian Bassman, Mary Ellen Mark, and Barbara Bordnick. The gallery closed in 1998, when she retired. She returned to modeling and the public eye at age 82 with an article in W followed by interviews in the Spanish and German editions of Vogue, The Sunday Telegraph, and New York. She starred in an ad campaign for Cole Haan as well.

== Personal life and death ==
She had two daughters from her first marriage. Her second marriage was to Riccardo Rosa, a former businessman and furniture exporter. They had been together since the late 1970s, and married in 2003 or 2004. From 1960 until her death, Machado resided in New York. She and her second husband lived in Sag Harbor, Long Island.

Machado died on 18 December 2016, at age 86, at Stony Brook University Hospital from cardiac arrest. She was survived by her two daughters, as well as by her second husband.

== Posthumous tribute ==
In 2019, Time created 89 new covers to celebrate women of the year starting from 1920; it chose Machado for 1958.
