= The Impossible Years (film) =

- Theatrical poster
- Directed by: Michael Gordon
- Screenplay by: George Wells
- Based on: The Impossible Years; 1965 play by Bob Fisher; Arthur Marx
- Produced by: Lawrence Weingarten
- Starring: David Niven
- Cinematography: William H. Daniels
- Edited by: James E. Newcom
- Music by: Don Costa
- Production company: Marten Productions
- Distributed by: Metro-Goldwyn-Mayer
- Release date: December 5, 1968 (New York City)
- Running time: 98 minutes
- Country: United States
- Language: English
- Box office: $5.8 million (North America)

The Impossible Years is a 1968 American comedy film directed by Michael Gordon, and starring David Niven. The film also features Lola Albright, Chad Everett, Ozzie Nelson in his final film appearance, and Cristina Ferrare, who was 17 years old at the time the film was shot. It is based upon the 1965 play of the same name by Bob Fisher and Arthur Marx, the son of Groucho Marx, and was adapted for the screen by George Wells.

The eponymous theme song was written by The Tokens and performed by The Cowsills.

== Plot ==
Jonathan Kingsley is a professor of psychiatry at the local university. An author of numerous books on parenting, he and wife Alice are raising two teenage daughters. The elder, Linda, 17, begins to display uncharacteristic behavior: walking as if on air, smiling incessantly for no reason, cleaning up her room daily, showing politeness toward her little sister, and more. It is suspected that she has lost her virginity while on a school field trip to Catalina Island, and Kingsley's general practitioner confirms this. Linda, while being interrogated, admits as much, and she reveals that she is married. She insists on concealing the identity of her husband until the film's conclusion.

== Cast ==
- David Niven as Jonathan Kingsley
- Lola Albright as Alice Kingsley
- Chad Everett as Richard Merrick
- Ozzie Nelson as Dr. Herbert Fleischer
- Cristina Ferrare as Linda Kingsley
- Darleen Carr as Abbey Kingsley
- Jeff Cooper as Bartholmew Smuts
- John Harding as Dean Harvey Rockwell
- Rich Chalet as Freddie Fleischer
- Mike McGreevey as Andy McClaine
- Don Beddoe as Dr. Elliot Fish
- Louise Lorimer as Mrs. Celia Fish
- Karen Norris as Mrs. Rockwell
- Susan French as Miss Hammer
- Trudi Ames as Francine
- Edward McKinley as Dr. Pepperell
- Ned Wertimer as Dr. Bodey

== Production ==
MGM bought the film rights to the play in 1965 for $350,000. George Wells completed the script by March 1966. MGM announced it for production in August 1966. The movie was greenlit by the team of Robert O'Brien and Robert M. Weitman. Filming took place in October 1967.

At one stage, Peter Sellers was announced for the lead but by May, David Niven had been signed. Christina Ferrare, who played Niven's nubile daughter, had been under contract to 20th Century Fox for a year. The film featured the final movie performance of Ozzie Nelson.

== Release ==
The Impossible Years premiered at New York City's Radio City Music Hall on December 5, 1968.

=== Box office ===
The film was a box-office hit, earning $5.8 million in rentals in North America, making it the 17th most popular movie at the U.S. box office in 1969.

=== Critical response ===
Critical reaction to The Impossible Years was overwhelmingly negative.

=== Home media ===
The Warner Archive Collection released The Impossible Years on an MOD DVD-R on May 16, 2011.

== Adaptations ==
In 1970, it was reported that Jackie Cooper and Bob Finkel had written a pilot script for a TV adaptation of the play for NBC.
