= J. W. Coop =

1972 film

- Film poster
- Directed by: Cliff Robertson
- Written by: Gary Cartwright; Cliff Robertson; Bud Shrake
- Produced by: Bruce Graham; Cliff Robertson
- Starring: Cliff Robertson; Geraldine Page; Christina Ferrare
- Cinematography: Frank Stanley
- Edited by: Alex Beaton
- Music by: Don Randi
- Production companies: Robertson and Associates
- Distributed by: Columbia Pictures
- Release dates: October 1971 (Chicago International Film Festival); January 1, 1972 (United States)
- Running time: 112 minutes
- Country: United States
- Language: English
- Budget: $736,000

J. W. Coop is a 1971 American Western film set in the world of the modern American rodeo circuit. It stars and was directed by Cliff Robertson who also co-produced and co-scripted the film. Featuring footage from actual rodeo events, it was made with the cooperation of the Rodeo Cowboys Association (which became the Professional Rodeo Cowboys Association in 1975).

Robertson was able to make the movie after his success in Charly (1968) although J.W. Coop turned out to be a financial disappointment.

== Plot ==
J.W. Coop is an ex-convict making up for lost time. His dream is to be the best rodeo cowboy, and the film follows his competitions on the circuit. He drives a converted ambulance and sleeps outdoors. Along the way, he meets a hippie girl named Bean, who joins him on the rodeo circuit.

As Coop's winnings grow, he and Bean are able to start sleeping in hotels, and Coop starts dreaming about settling down on a ranch. Bean is too independent to share his domestic dreams, but she loves sharing in Coop's journey.

At the national competition, Coop places second and breaks his leg. To Coop, second place is as good as last. The film ends with him riding a particularly vicious bull with his leg still in a cast. Coop stays on for the full 8 seconds, but his hand remains caught in the rope, preventing him from dismounting. The bull tosses him around and gores him. The film ends with Coop bleeding heavily on the side of the arena.

== Cast ==
- Cliff Robertson as J.W. Coop
- Geraldine Page as Mama
- Cristina Ferrare as Bean
- R. G. Armstrong as Jim Sawyer
- R. L. Armstrong as Tooter Watson
- John Crawford as Rancher
- Wade Crosby as Billy Sol Gibbs
- Marjorie Durant Dye as Big Marge
- Paul Harper as Warden Morgan
- Son Hooker as Motorcycle Cop
- Richard Kennedy as Sheriff
- Bruce Kirby as Diesel Tanker Driver
- Judy Farrell as Barmaid
- Larry Mahan as Himself
- Lowell D. Smith as Flankman (Golden State Rodeo Co.)

== Production ==
J. W. Coop was made on a $736,000 budget. As actor and director, Robertson worked for scale. All other cast members except Geraldine Page worked for scale. The actors and crew slept in Best Westerns which were prominently displayed in the film.

== Critical reception ==
Critics' perception of the film is notable by both extremes. Stanley Kauffmann of The New Republic described J. W. Coop as "poor."

Writing in The New York Times, Vincent Canby found the film to be "very fine, almost elegiac."

Variety wrote: "J.W. Coop is an engaging yarn which follows the reorientation of a rodeo rider, who after spending 10 years in jail for passing a bum check and fighting with a sheriff, is released to discover he is in collision with a totally-unexpected present.
