= Anthony Thomopoulos =

American media executive

Anthony Denis "Tony" Thomopoulos (Greek: Αντώνης Θωμόπουλος) is an American film and television executive. Thomopoulos spent 12 years of his career at ABC, progressively taking up such positions as Vice President of Prime Time Programs, President of ABC Entertainment, and President of ABC Broadcast Group.

== Biography ==
The son of Greek immigrants, he grew up in the Bronx and raised as Greek Orthodox. His father owned a restaurant. After a high school aptitude test marked Thomopoulos as a potential diplomat, he applied to Georgetown University's Edmund A. Walsh School of Foreign Service. There, he instead developed an interest in business. After graduating, he worked as a mail clerk at NBC's New York headquarters.

== Business career ==
Thomopoulos was hired by Barry Diller to oversee prime-time programming at ABC. He was noted, among other things, for the tough position he took in dealing with the contract holdout of Suzanne Somers on the ABC show Three's Company, and for his timely cancellation of the 1982 Police Squad!, explaining that the show had been cancelled because, among other reasons, "it required constant viewing, and he didn't think that people can watch a TV series without some distractions". In June 1983, he was named president of the broadcast group. He resigned as president in 1985 and became chairman of United Artists Pictures, where he supervised such productions as Betrayed, Baby Boom, and The Living Daylights. In 1989, Thomopoulos formed Thomopoulos Productions, an independent production company of both motion pictures and television programs.

From 1991 to 1995, he was President of Amblin Television, a division of Amblin Entertainment. He was responsible for the original placement of NBC's TV series ER, in addition to several other series on network television. In 1995, Thomopoulos joined International Family Entertainment, Inc. (IFE). His responsibilities included programming operations for The Family Channel. He was named CEO of MTM Entertainment, Inc., a subsidiary of IFE, and was also responsible for operations of MTM Television and MTM Distribution.

Thomopoulos was chairman and CEO of artist Thomas Kinkade's Media Arts Group from June 2001 to January 2004. He subsequently founded Morning Light Productions.

== Personal life ==
Thomopoulos's first marriage ended in 1983 after 22 years, and produced three children. In 1985, he married television host Cristina Ferrare. They have two children. As of 2011, they lived in California.

Business positions
Preceded by Fred Silverman	President of ABC Entertainment; 1978-1983	Succeeded by Lewis Erlicht
Preceded by unknown	President of ABC Broadcast Group; 1983-1985	Succeeded by unknown
