= Martin LaSalle =

French-Uruguayan actor

- Born: January 19, 1935
- Died: 17 October 2018 (aged 83)
- Occupation: Actor
- Years active: 1959–2018
- Spouses: China Machado (m. 1957; div. 1965); Rosa Maria Blanco Ruggerio (m. 1968)
- Children: 3

Martin Luis LaSalle Supervielle (19 January 1935 – 17 October 2018) was a French-Uruguayan actor. LaSalle first appeared in the Robert Bresson film Pickpocket (1959). Previously unknown, and in line with the director's mature practice, not then an actor, he was cast in the lead role. Following his debut, he appeared in more than 70 films and television shows.

== Personal life ==
From 1957 to 1965, he was married to the fashion model China Machado and they had two daughters - Emmanuelle LaSalle and Blanche LaSalle. In 1968, while on assignment with Life to photograph the 1968 Olympics in Mexico City, he met his second wife, the Mexican artist Rosa Maria Blanco Ruggerio and they had a daughter - Maria Narayani Lasala Blanco. La Salle died on 17 October 2018 at the age of 83.

== Selected filmography ==
- Pickpocket (1959)
- Acteón (1965)
- The Mansion of Madness (1973)
- Alucarda (1978)
- The Dogs of War (1980)
- Sorceress (1982)
- Missing (1982)
- Under Fire (1983)
- The Penitent (1988)
- Buster (1988)
- Nora's Will (2008)
