= Pickpocket (film) =

1959 French film by Robert Bresson

- French theatrical poster
- Directed by: Robert Bresson
- Written by: Robert Bresson
- Produced by: Agnès Delahaie
- Starring: Martin LaSalle
- Cinematography: Léonce-Henri Burel
- Edited by: Raymond Lamy
- Music by: Jean-Baptiste Lully; Johann Caspar Ferdinand Fischer
- Release date: 16 December 1959
- Running time: 75 minutes
- Country: France
- Language: French

Pickpocket is a 1959 French film written and directed by Robert Bresson. It stars Martin LaSalle, in his feature film debut, in the title role, and features Marika Green, Pierre Leymarie, and Jean Pélégri in supporting roles. It features a pickpocket who is drawn to crime, despite the intercession of his family, his friends, and even an empathetic policeman.

The film has been considered to be one of Bresson's best films and one of the greatest films of all time. Along with A Gentle Woman and Four Nights of a Dreamer, it is one of three Bresson movies heavily influenced by the works of Fyodor Dostoyevsky, Bresson's favorite author. It combines elements of Crime and Punishment's Rodion Raskolnikov (who questions whether moral rules should apply to superior men) with a street-crime plot inspired by Samuel Fuller's film Pickup on South Street (1953).

== Plot ==
Michel is an unemployed young man living in Paris. His friends Jacques and Jeanne try to help him, but while Jacques finds him several jobs, Michel considers them beneath him. Michel also has a distant relationship with his sickly mother. Despite his friends' entreaties, he frequently makes up excuses to avoid her.

Michel steals money from a spectator at Longchamp Racecourse. To his surprise, the police arrest him. However, the chief inspector is forced to release him for lack of proof.

At a bar, Michel asks Jacques for help finding a job. Jacques is skeptical, but agrees to help. Coincidentally, the chief inspector is also at the bar. Michel comes to life and subtly gloats to the inspector about his escape. Like Dostoyevsky's Raskolnikov, he asserts that superior men should not be bound by the same laws as everyone else.

One day, Michel finds himself drawn to the graceful movements of a subway pickpocket. Michel tries to copy the pickpocket's technique. After some early successes, he proudly tells Jacques he no longer needs a job. However, he is caught after a week, and is forced to lie low for a few days. He sees a mysterious man lurking outside his flat. Although Jacques and Jeanne ask him to visit his mother, who is very ill, Michel pursues the man, a pickpocket proposing a profitable partnership.

Michel's focus on crime damages his relationship with his family and friends. He goes to a carnival with Jacques and Jeanne, but leaves to steal a man's watch. Later, he resentfully questions Jacques about whether he is in love with Jeanne. In addition, he neglects to visit his mother until she is on her deathbed; she kindly tells him that he has enough talent to succeed in life "whenever you want." After she dies, Michel and Jeanne argue about whether she will go to heaven. Michel asserts that moral rules do not exist. Jeanne asks Michel whether he believes in anything. Michel responds, "I believed in God—for three minutes."

Michel's two accomplices are arrested. Although Michel escapes, the chief inspector visits his flat as a warning. The inspector explains that while he hoped Michel would go straight after the close call at Longchamp, he no longer believes Michel will change. He adds that a month before Michel was arrested at the racetrack, Jeanne filed a police report saying that someone had stolen money from Michel's mother. However, the report was withdrawn the next day. He does not say who withdrew the complaint, but implies he knows Michel was the thief. After a conversation with Jeanne, Michel realizes that his mother withdrew the complaint, meaning that his mother knew her son stole from her. Jeanne is appalled, but tearfully hugs him.

To avoid the police, Michel flees to London, where he resumes pickpocketing. Two years later, he returns to Paris, having wasted all of his ill-gotten gains on gambling and women. He visits Jeanne and learns that while she had a child with Jacques, she decided to be a single mother because she did not love Jacques. Michel agrees to get an honest job to support the child, but his temptations remain.

One day, Michel finds himself following a racing enthusiast to Longchamp. Although Michel suspects a setup, he cannot resist stealing from him. As it turns out, the man is a plainclothes officer conducting a sting operation. This time, the police actually send Michel to jail.

Jeanne dutifully visits Michel in jail every week, but when she skips three straight weeks, Michel finds himself pained by her absence. She visits the following week, and Michel kisses her. Michel remarks to himself, "Oh, Jeanne, what a strange path I had to take to reach you at last."

== Cast ==
- Martin LaSalle as Michel
- Marika Green as Jeanne
- Jean Pélégri as the Chief Inspector
- Dolly Scal as the Mother
- Pierre Leymarie as Jacques
- Henri Kassagi as 1st Accomplice
- Pierre Étaix as 2nd Accomplice
- César Gattegno as an Inspector

== Production ==
Bresson was supposedly inspired by Samuel Fuller's film Pickup on South Street (1953), which is also about pickpockets. (Pickup on South Street was not released in French theaters until 1961, but it was well-received at the 1954 Venice Film Festival.) Pickpocket shares many plot elements with Fuller's film, including the dying mother, the notion of the pickpocket as outsider, and "the interlinking of pocketpicking and sexuality."

In addition, at one point in the film, Jacques reads and asks to borrow Michel's copy of Richard S. Lambert's The Prince of Pickpockets: A Study of George Barrington.

Bresson wrote the film "in three months and shot [it] in the midst of crowds in a minimal amount of time." The resulting disorder proved to be a challenge during shooting, but was sometimes used to the crew's advantage, as in the Gare de Lyon pickpocketing sequence.

The French-Tunisian pickpocket Henri Kassagi acted as technical advisor on the film, as well as appearing as instructor and accomplice to the main character. After Pickpocket, Kassagi's face and techniques were too well known for him to continue with his old trade, and he changed career to become a successful stage magician.

== Reception ==
=== Critical reception ===
On the review aggregator website Rotten Tomatoes, 93% of 43 critics' reviews are positive, with an average rating of 9.1/10. The website's consensus reads: "Narratively spare and told with clockwork precision, Pickpocket is a carefully observed character study that packs an emotional wallop."

=== Awards ===
Pickpocket was entered into competition for the Golden Bear at the 10th Berlin International Film Festival, where it lost to El Lazarillo de Tormes. Cahiers du Cinema named it the fourth-best film of 1959.

=== Influence ===
Pickpocket is often considered one of Bresson's greatest films. In the 2012 Sight and Sound critics' poll, Pickpocket was ranked at #63rd place, tying with Sunset Boulevard, Modern Times, Wild Strawberries, The Night of the Hunter, and Rio Bravo. In the 2022 critic's poll, the film was ranked at 136th place. In the 2022 directors' poll, it was ranked at 93rd place.

Werner Herzog praised the film by calling it "phenomenal" and "So intense and so beautiful… It makes you ache". Yorgos Lanthimos called Pickpocket as "the most moving film I've ever seen". Christa Lang and Richard Linklater listed the film in their ten top picks from The Criterion Collection. In addition, the French streaming website La Cinetek lists Martin Scorsese, Chantal Akerman, Agnès Varda, Todd Haynes, and Agnieszka Holland as fans of the film, among others.

The film exerted a formative influence over the work of Schrader, who has described it as "an unmitigated masterpiece" and "as close to perfect as there can be", and whose films American Gigolo (1980), Patty Hearst (1988), Light Sleeper (1992), First Reformed (2017), and The Card Counter (2021) all feature endings similar to that of Pickpocket. In addition, Schrader's screenplay for Martin Scorsese's Taxi Driver (1976) bears many similarities, including confessional narration and a voyeuristic look at society. Schrader was inspired by Bresson's use of "an occupational metaphor" to highlight "a personal problem which is also reflective of a social malaise," noting that in Taxi Driver, the motif of a taxicab allowed him to show Travis Bickle as "a kid locked in a yellow coffin, floating through the open sewers of the city, who seems in the middle of a crowd to be absolutely alone." Schrader's admiration for Pickpocket led to his providing a filmed introduction for The Criterion Collection's 2005 DVD release of the film.

Pickpocket has been paraphrased by other films, such as Leos Carax's Les Amants du Pont-Neuf (1991). The Dardenne brothers' 2005 film L'Enfant has also been said to have been influenced by the film. Christopher Nolan said he studied Pickpocket, along with Bresson's earlier film A Man Escaped, when making his 2017 film Dunkirk, to study how Bresson created suspense through details.

== Analysis ==
=== Comparison to Dostoyevsky ===
Critics have frequently noted how Pickpocket echoes Dostoyevsky's Crime and Punishment. Roger Ebert wrote: "Bresson's Michel, like Dostoyevsky's hero Raskolnikov, needs money in order to realize his dreams, and sees no reason why some lackluster ordinary person should not be forced to supply it. The reasoning is immoral, but the characters claim special privileges above and beyond common morality." Gary Indiana added that like Crime and Punishment, "A man commits forbidden acts, gets caught, and goes to prison, where his suffering is ameliorated by the steadfast love of a good woman." Additionally, the police inspector's game of cat-and-mouse with Michel has a parallel subplot in Crime and Punishment.

However, Indiana cautioned that Pickpocket is different from an adaptation, noting that Michel offers merely a "watery, feebly asserted version of Raskolnikov's Nietzscheanism" to defend his crimes, and that "his crimes never rise above the level of common, small-time transgression. They are enlarged to epic scale only by his neurasthenic imagination." Likewise, Cosmo Bjorkenheim writes that Michel's "half-baked Nietzschean-Raskolnikovian theory about an elite of geniuses sounds like something loosely quoted from Rope rather than something deeply felt." Ebert argues that Michel does not actually believe he is above the law, and that he is distinguished by his subconscious desire to be caught.

=== Subtext ===
As Paul Schrader summarized, "Pickpocket isn't really about being a pickpocket." Peter Labuza writes that "when watching Pickpocket, it is easy to ascribe many things onto the film — the possible Freudian and homosexual tendencies, the heavy Catholic guilt, and Bresson’s critiques of French society."

Bresson's direction has been recognized for its material sensuality. Pickpocket has been called an example of "parametric narration", in which the style "dominates the syuzhet [plot] or is seemingly equal in importance to it". The Harvard Film Archive notes that a "diffuse eroticism ... permeates the film, pointing towards the more overt sensuality of the later Bresson." Ebert likened Michel's encounter with the mentor pickpocket to cruising, saying that their confrontation in a men's bathroom is "no coincidence." He left it to the reader to decide why "Michel does not want to see his mother, but gives Jeanne money for her."

Gary Indiana notes that "stealing has a specific psychosexual meaning for [Michel], beyond fulfilling the simple need to eat. ... Michel steals because it is the only act that makes him feel alive in a world becoming dead." He opines that while Michel ends up with Jeanne at the end, the survival of their relationship is not a foregone conclusion, and "far more romantic than his dealings with Jeanne are Michel’s encounters with the thief played by the real-life pickpocket Kassagi."

However, Armond White cautions that an over-focus on gay subtext may distract from the primary thread of the film, which is a deeply Catholic moral parable. According to White, "Bresson never denies the sensuous, stealthy, erotic exchange of Michel's pickpocketing routines," but White insists that "these montages fragment intimacy" instead of delivering it. Slant's Ed Gonzalez concluded that Pickpocket's religious and sexual themes are in dialogue with each other, explaining that "Bresson so completely understood the full spectrum of our human condition that to ignore the sexual and spiritual elements that run concurrently through his films is to not get Bresson at all."
