= Sorceress (1982 film) =

1982 fantasy film by Jack Hill

- Film poster
- Directed by: Jack Hill (as 'Brian Stuart')
- Written by: Jim Wynorski; Uncredited: Jack Hill
- Produced by: Jack Hill
- Starring: Leigh Harris; Lynette Harris; Roberto Nelson; David Millbern; Bruno Rey; Ana De Sade; Roberto Ballesteros; Martin LaSalle
- Cinematography: Alex Phillips Jr.
- Edited by: Larry Bock; Barry Zetlin
- Production companies: New World Pictures; Conacine
- Distributed by: New World Pictures
- Release dates: October 1, 1982 (U.S.); January 23, 1986 (Mexico)
- Running time: 83 minutes
- Countries: United States; Mexico
- Language: English
- Budget: $500,000
- Box office: $3–$4 million

Sorceress is a 1982 sword-and-sorcery film directed and produced by Jack Hill (credited as 'Brian Stuart'), starring identical twins Leigh and Lynette Harris in the leading roles. It was produced and distributed by Roger Corman's New World Pictures. As of 2026, this is the last film directed by Jack Hill.

== Plot ==
To maintain his powers, the evil wizard Traigon must sacrifice his firstborn child to the god Caligara. After giving birth to twin daughters, Mara and Mira, his wife refuses to tell Traigon which was born first. She flees with the young children and convinces a peasant to raise them as warrior boys; the pursuing Traigon inflicts a mortal wound upon her.

However, she stabs him with a spear and magically banishes him for 20 years before she dies. The wandering hippie-like wizard Krona arrives and also helps defeat Traigon, and gives the infants his magical powers and martial-arts powers. He also tells them to invoke the higher power named "Vital" when they are in trouble.

When Traigon returns, he resumes hunting down his now-adult daughters (the Harris sisters), still intending to sacrifice them to Caligara. The twins enlist the help of a satyr, Pando, a young, curly-haired barbarian, Erlick, and a Viking, Baldar, in their struggle to defeat their own father.

The twins, while swimming naked in a pond, note Pando spying on them, though they are too naive to understand why. Baldar happens by, and they set off. In a city marketplace, they happen upon Erlick using loaded dice to win money at gambling. His opponents get angry and attack him, but he escapes and joins Baldar, Pando, and the twins.

Traigon's forces kill the twins' adoptive parents and rape their adoptive sister, though the twins return from elsewhere and defeat the marauders. Krona comes by, now old, and walks into a fire, following his apologizing for arriving too late to save the twins' family.

At a safe house, the twins start disrobing their boyish clothing and cylindrical hats; Baldar, who referred to them as "lads" previously, and Erlick are flustered and try to explain to the twins that they are not really boys. Other adventures ensue, including Traigon's trained apes throwing exploding fruit at the party. One ape, a favorite of Traigon's lieutenant Delissia, is promised Mira as his own.

Eventually Traigon's forces capture Erlick and Mara (the firstborn) and bring them to Traigon's castle. Erlick is stripped naked and about to be impaled from below, but is set free just in time, when he reveals his royal blood as a king's son. Traigon decides Erlick's royal blood will be useful in preparing Mara for sacrifice; he has Mara dressed in feminine clothing and tries to mate her with Erlick.

Erlick and Mara have a romantic interlude, which Mira can feel telepathically; Pando, seeing her writhing around, gets excited, but Baldar, saying that he is sworn to protect the twins, restrains him. Baldar and Mira then attempt to rescue Erlick and Mara, but are cast into a pit.

However, the ape Mira was promised to, uncovers the pit. The party must contend with evil zombies whom Traigon is raising out of the pit, part of his evil plan. Meanwhile, Pando has been raising an army of villagers and goats, which arrives to help Baldar and Mira.

Erlick is about to sacrifice Mara with a knife, when she remembers the name "Vital", and invokes it. A benevolent god who looks like a flying lion appears in the sky, and sends out force beams which drive away the evil Caligara, who has arrived and is sending down explosions towards the battlefield. The twins kill their father Traigon.

Finally, Erlick has both Mara and Mira in his arms. Baldar is puzzled, but Erlick reminds him that the twins are, after all, "two who are one", a refrain throughout the film, and he and the twins laugh.

== Cast ==
- Leigh Harris as Mira
- Lynette Harris as Mara
- Roberto Nelson as Erlick
- David Millbern as Pando
- Bruno Rey as Baldar
- Ana de Sade as Delissia
- Roberto Ballesteros as Traigon
- Douglas Sandoval as Hunnu
- Antonio Zubiaga as Khrakannon
- Martin LaSalle as Krona
- Silvia Manríquez as Kanti
- William Arnold as Dargon
- Teresa Conway as Amaya
- Gerardo Zepeda as Executioner

== Production ==
=== Development ===
Jack Hill says Corman approached him to do a sword and sorcery film inspired by the success of Conan the Barbarian. Hill:

At that time, Roger had a special effects studio [at the New World Studios in Venice, California] that was doing really good work. They had done some of the special effects work on [John Carpenter's] Escape from New York [1981] and some other big pictures, and Corman owned the special effects unit himself, so he could do it for a low budget. So to me, it was an opportunity to make something that would look like a big movie, which I had never had an opportunity to do before. I thought this might get me back in business doing mainstream pictures.

"I should have known better," joked Hill later. He said he was inspired to do a film about twin girls inspired by The Corsican Brothers.

Hill says he wrote the script "entirely" but Jim Wynorski is the only one credited. Hill says "the dialogue was unfortunately all dubbed in by amateurs and office employees, of which I was not involved in."

Hill wrote the part of Pando for Sid Haig who had appeared in many of Hill's films but Corman would not pay the actor's fee so another person played the role.

=== Filming ===
According to Hill, Corman wanted to make the film in the Philippines, then got a deal to do it in Portugal. Hill visited that country and found out they did not have the facilities. Corman was then going to make it in Italy, which Hill thought would be ideal. Then two weeks before filming Corman told Hill he had arranged a better deal in Mexico, and that is where the film was shot.

Hill said "We were there for three or four months while they put together this very strange kind of deal with various crooks like (on one side) the Mexican government and (on the other side) Hemdale, which is now very notorious."

The movie was shot in and around Tepoztlán, Morelos in October 1981. Production was extremely difficult, plagued by rain, fire, and low budget. Hill claimed that Roger Corman never delivered the budget he promised, forcing him to compromise on both special effects and music. (Hill says the rise in the video market caused the decline in drive ins and Corman was even more worried than usual about money.)

Hill says the Mexican crew "worked their hearts out on the film" but also told him "this production had the most problems of any movie they had ever been on - all kinds of things went wrong. The Mexican film vault on the studio lot even blew up."

=== Post-production ===
Like many New World films of the time, it re-used James Horner's musical score from Battle Beyond the Stars (1980). Because most of the cast were Mexicans (credited under anglicized pseudonyms), the entire cast (including the Harris twins) was re-dubbed in post-production. Corman did not want to pay a professional voice cast to re-record all the dialogue, instead having various New World Pictures employees fill out the parts.

== Reception ==
Hill took his name off the film, which only made a little over $1.3 million at the box office. It became the last time he and Corman ever worked together.

The Los Angeles Times called it "a fairly shabby movie."

Corman went on to make a series of sword and sorcery films including Deathstalker and Deathstalker 2.
