= Henri Kassagi =

French-Tunisian magician, painter, actor, author and former pickpocket

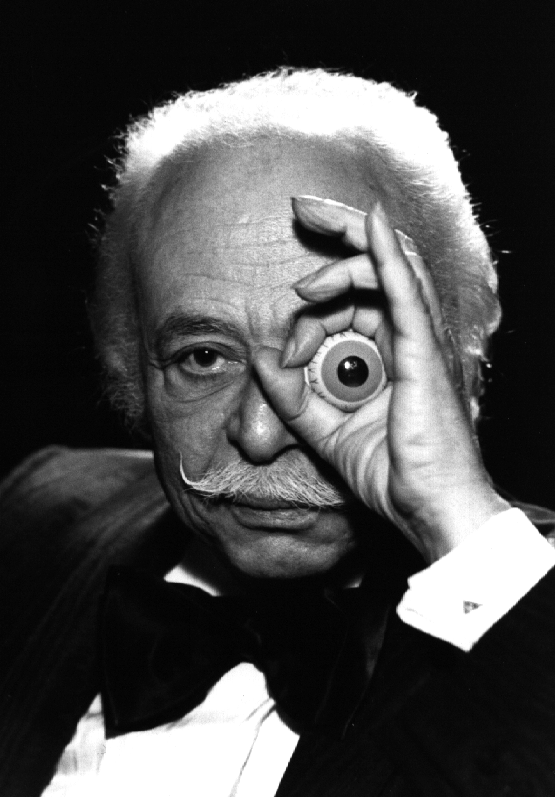
- Born: Abd El-maǧīd al-QaṣʿAǧī; 28 September 1932; Halfaouine; Tunis, Tunisia
- Died: before 23 June 1997 (aged 64–65); Paris, France

Henry Kassagi (born Abd El-maǧīd al-QaṣʿAǧī, 28 September 1932 – 23 June 1997), known as Kassagi, was a Franco-Tunisian magician, painter, actor, author and former pickpocket.

== Career ==
Henri Kassagi was born Abd El-maǧīd al-QaṣʿAǧī in Halfaouine, a district of Tunis. At the age of 12 he witnessed a magic trick and from that moment knew his vocation: he had already trained his hands in dexterity by pickpocketing in the streets of Tunis.

At the start of the 1950s, he left Tunisia for Paris, where he continued to earn his living as a pickpocket. There he met the film director Robert Bresson, who gave him the position of technical advisor to perfect the actions of the thieves in the film Pickpocket, as well as appearing as instructor and accomplice to the main character.

After Pickpocket, Kassagi's face and techniques were too well known for him to continue with his old trade, and he changed career to become a stage magician. In the following years, he made a name for himself in the world of magic shows and conjuring in France and around the world. His speciality resembled the technique of pickpockets, described in the Grand Larousse encyclopédique.

Kassagi appeared in photo comics published in the magazine Télé Poche, and was invited to appear in television shows such as Télé Dimanche. He was successful and made several world tours.

At the beginning of the 1970s, he bought the house of the priest of Bonnefoi in Orne, which he restored.

His career declined at the end of the 1970s. In 1981 he decided to return to his native country, intending to build an entertainment centre including a casino, a restaurant, an exhibition hall, a nightclub and a theatre in Hammamet. This ambitious project did not come to fruition and he returned to France.

== Personal life ==
His first wife was his French assistant Hélène Chauvel, the mother of their son Dominique (born 1956). After their divorce, Kassagi met a German woman, Marion König, in Berlin during an engagement in the city. She became his assistant on and behind the stage, and they married on 29 February 1980. In the same year their daughter Vanina was born. They separated in 1991 and the divorce was finalised later.

Kassagi died at the age of 64 in his apartment at 6, boulevard Jourdan in the 14th arrondissement of Paris and was found on 23 June 1997. The forensic pathologist attributed the death to cerebral infarction, which had occurred three or four weeks before the discovery of the body. A funeral at Père-Lachaise Cemetery was organised by his ex-wife Marion and his daughter; however, after the intervention of his Tunisian family and son and the Consulate General of Tunisia in Paris, his body was transferred to Tunisia. He is buried at the Djellaz cemetery in Tunis.

== Filmography ==
- Pickpocket (1959)
- Navarro (TV series), season 7, 1995: episode 2 – "Coup bas"

== Sources ==
- "Kassagi". Journal de la prestidigitation (Journal of Conjuring) (in French) (269). July–August 1969.
- Genève, P.; Jimenez, A. "Portrait: Henri Kassagi, Illusionniste et Prestidigitateur". Sciences et magie (in French). "Interviews with Kassagi 1992–1993"

== Bibliography ==
- Kassagi (1 January 1965). Devenez magicien (Become a Magician) (in French). Paris: Sodepresse. ASIN B003WZ434O.
- "Un pickpocket à l'école (A Pickpocket at School)". Les Temps modernes (in French) (233). 1965.
- Kassagi (1 January 1973). La Magie pour tous (Magic for Everyone) (in French). Paris: Breteuil. ISBN 978-2706900020.
- Magie 2000 magic box, CEIJ (publisher)
