= Acteón (film) =

1965 film

- Directed by: Jorge Grau
- Written by: Jorge Grau
- Starring: Martin LaSalle
- Cinematography: Aurelio G. Larraya
- Release date: 1965
- Running time: 75 minutes
- Country: Spain
- Language: Spanish

Acteón is a 1965 Spanish drama film directed by Jorge Grau. It was entered into the 4th Moscow International Film Festival.

== Synopsis ==
The film narrates the unusual relationship between a fisherman and a foreign girl.

== Cast ==
- Martin LaSalle as Acteón
- Pilar Clemens as Primera Mujer
- Juan Luis Galiardo as Joven
- Claudia Gravy as Segunda Mujer (as Claudia Gravi)
- Iván Tubau as Prestidigitador
- Nieves Salcedo as Mujer del Prestidigitador
- Virginia Quintana as Mujer en Metro
- Guillermo Méndez as General prusiano
