= Jorge Grau =

Spanish painter

- Born: Jorge Grau Solá; 27 October 1930; Barcelona, Spain
- Died: 26 December 2018 (aged 88); Madrid, Spain
- Occupations: Director, writer, painter

Jorge Grau (born Jorge Grau Solá, 27 October 1930 – 26 December 2018) was a Spanish director, scriptwriter, playwright and painter. His 1965 film Acteón was entered into the 4th Moscow International Film Festival. In 1973, he directed Ceremonia sangrienta (a.k.a. Legend of Blood Castle and The Female Butcher), starring Ewa Aulin. In 1974, he directed the cult zombie film The Living Dead at the Manchester Morgue (a.k.a. Let Sleeping Corpses Lie, a.k.a. Don't Open the Window.) Grau died on 27 December 2018.

== Selected filmography ==
- Acteón (1965)
- Ceremonia sangrienta (1973) a.k.a. Legend of Blood Castle, a.k.a. The Female Butcher
- Violent Blood Bath (1973) a.k.a. Penalty of Death
- Let Sleeping Corpses Lie (1974) a.k.a. The Living Dead at the Manchester Morgue
- El extranger-oh! de la calle Cruz del Sur (1987)
