= Juan López Moctezuma =

Mexican filmmaker (1932–1995)

- Born: 19 May 1932; Mexico City, Mexico
- Died: 2 August 1995 (aged 63); Mexico City, Mexico
- Education: National Autonomous University of Mexico
- Occupations: Film director; screenwriter; film producer; theatre director; actor

Juan López Moctezuma (May 19, 1932 – August 2, 1995) was a Mexican filmmaker, theatre director, and actor. He is best known for directing the 1977 horror film Alucarda, widely considered as one of the best Mexican horror films of all time.

== Biography ==
=== Early life and education ===
Moctezuma was born in Mexico City in 1932. His father was a judge, and Moctezuma's family originally wanted him to follow a similar path. He studied art, theatre, and music at the National Autonomous University of Mexico, and was active with the University's radio station XEUN-FM, creating the long-running program Panorama de Jazz. He worked on similar cultural programs for both radio and television in the following years.

A theatre director by training, Moctezuma worked as an assistant to "the father of Mexican theatre" Seki Sano during the 1960s, during which time he met Alejandro Jodorowsky. He subsequently helped produce Jodorowsky's films Fando y Lis (1968) and El Topo (1970).

=== Filmmaker ===
In 1973, Moctezuma made his feature directorial debut The Mansion of Madness (1973), a surrealist horror film adaptation of Edgar Allan Poe's "The System of Doctor Tarr and Professor Fether", using some of the same creative team as El Topo. The film was both a critical and commercial success. He next directed the U.S./Mexican co-production Mary, Mary, Bloody Mary, starring Cristina Ferrare and John Carradine.

In 1977, he directed his most recognized and controversial work, Alucarda (1977), which tells the story of a satanic possession in a Catholic convent. Despite facing censorship upon its initial release in Mexico, the film is widely regarded as one of the best Mexican horror films of all time, and the British Film Institute described it as a masterpiece.

Moctezuma's next film, To Kill a Stranger (1983), was a thriller starring Angélica María, Donald Pleasence, and Dean Stockwell. In 1986, he directed his only film in America, the immigration-themed dramedy Welcome Maria. During the early 1990s, Moctzeuma shot a pilot episode for a horror anthology television series at TV Azteca, which never aired and is now considered lost. His last film El alimento del miedo, premiered in 1995.

In addition to his filmmaking career, Moctezuma was an executive at the Televisa network (he was personal friends with Emilio Azcárraga Jean), and was director of its European division for eight years.

=== Later life ===
In his later life, Moctezuma suffered personal and professional setbacks that led him to be fired from Televisa and isolate himself in a small rooftop apartment in Los Angeles. He was later diagnosed with Alzheimer's disease, and held in a care facility in Mexico City.

In 1993, two fans of Moctezuma abducted the director from the facility and took him to various filming locations of his movies, before returning him. The incident was the subject of the 2011 documentary Alucardos, Retrato de un vampiro.

== Death and legacy ==
Moctezuma died on August 2, 1995, at the age of 63.

Roman Polanski cited The Mansion of Madness as an inspiration for his film The Tenant (1976).

Guillermo del Toro has cited Moctezuma's influence, naming Alucarda as one of his favorite films.

== Filmography ==
Year	Original title	English title	Functioned as			Notes
Year	Original title	English title	Director	Writer	Producer	Notes
1973	La mansión de la locura	The Mansion of Madness	Yes	Yes	No	
1975	Mary, Mary, Bloody Mary	Mary, Mary, Bloody Mary	Yes	No	No	
1977	Alucarda, la hija de las tinieblas	Alucarda	Yes	Yes	Yes	
1984	Matar a un extraño	To Kill a Stranger	Yes	Yes	No	
1986	Bienvenido María	Welcome María	Yes	Yes	No	
1995	El alimento del miedo	—N/a	Yes	Yes	No	

=== Producer only ===
- Fando y Lis (1968) - Associate producer
- El Topo (1970)

=== Acting roles ===
- Alguien nos quiere matar (1970) - (voice)
- Adios, amor... (1973) - Police Officer
- Canoa: A Shameful Memory (1976) - Narrator (voice)
- Alucarda (1977) - Monk
- To Kill a Stranger (1984) - Albert Morell
- Se equivocó la cigüeña (1993) - Curate
- El alimento del miedo (1994) - Don Ramón
