= Cristina Ferrare =

American fashion model, actress, author and talk-show host (born 1950)

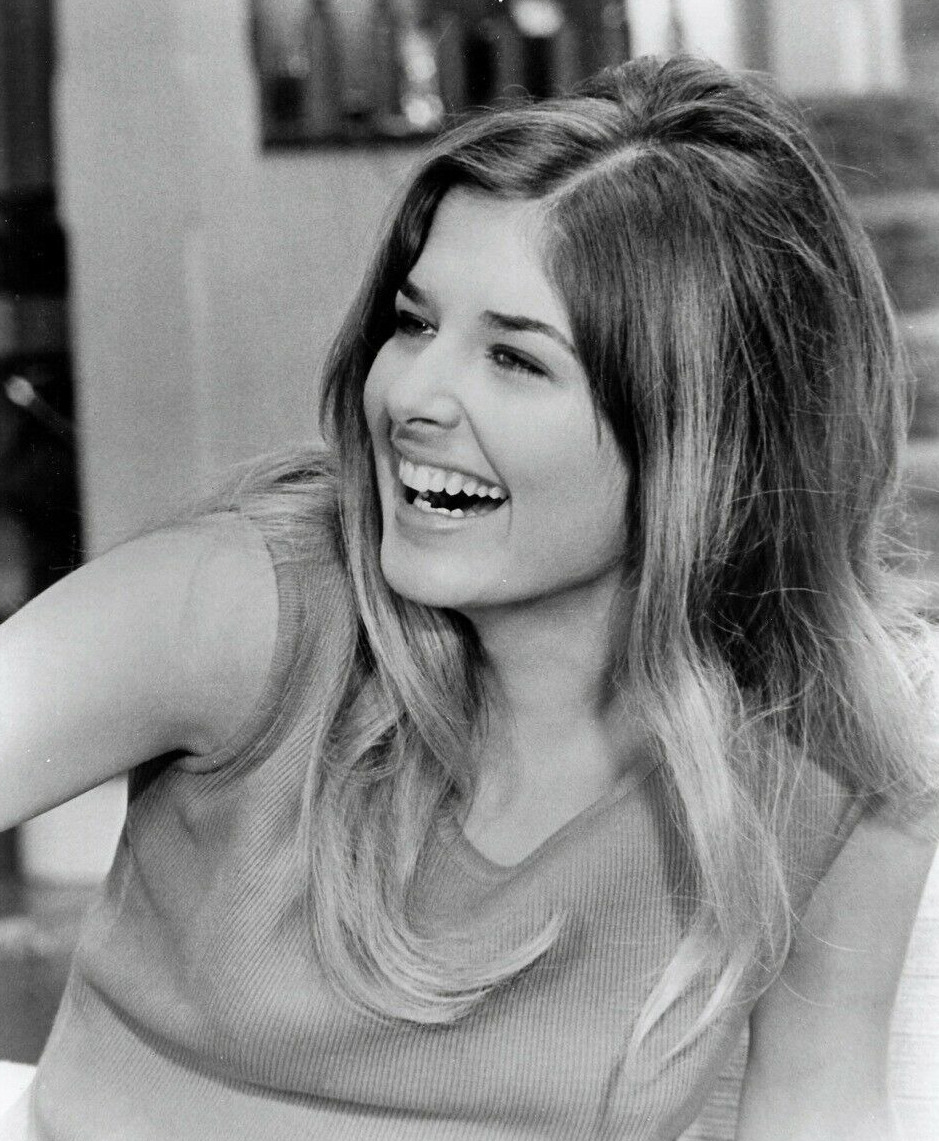
- Ferrare c. 1971
- Born: Cynthia Cristina Ferrare; February 1950 (age 76); Cleveland, Ohio, U.S.
- Occupations: Actress; model; author; television talk-show host
- Years active: 1968–present
- Spouses: Nicholas Thomas (m. 1969; annul. 1969) John DeLorean (m. 1973; div. 1985) Anthony Thomopoulos (m. 1985)
- Children: 4
- Relatives: Danielle Bisutti (niece)

Cynthia Cristina Ferrare (born February 8, 1950 (Note: Sources vary as to Ferrare's birthdate; Turner Classic Movies notes in her biographical entry that she was born February 8, 1950, as does her entry on the film website Rotten Tomatoes, though some list a birthdate of February 18, 1950.)) is an American fashion model, actress, author and talk-show host. She had lead roles in several films in the late-1960s and early-1970s, including the 1968 comedy The Impossible Years and the 1972 Western film J. W. Coop, as well as portraying the titular character in Juan López Moctezuma's horror film Mary, Mary, Bloody Mary (also 1972).

In the 1980s, Ferrare transitioned from acting to hosting several television series, including The Home Show, Home & Family, and Big Bowl of Love on the Oprah Winfrey Network. She has also authored several non-fiction cooking and self-help books.

== Early life ==
Ferrare was born on February 8, 1950, in Cleveland, Ohio, the daughter of Renata and Tavio Ferrare, a butcher. Her family is of Italian descent. She was 14 years old when her family moved to Los Angeles, California, where her beauty landed her a contract with Nina Blanchard's modeling agency. When she was 16, she signed with 20th Century Fox film studios.

== Career ==
=== Acting career and television hosting ===
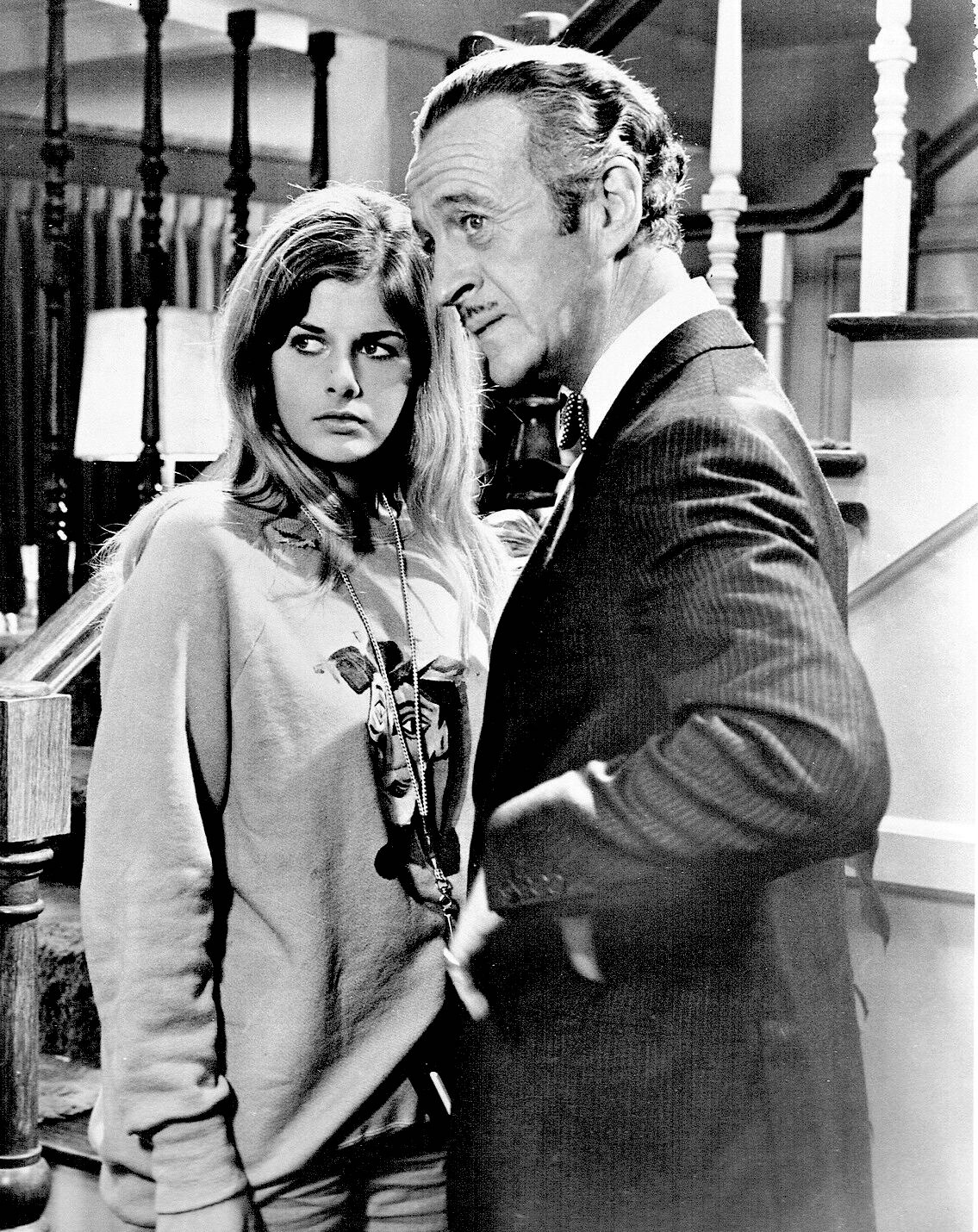
Ferrare and David Niven in The Impossible Years (1968)

In 1966, the teenager, billed as Cindy Ferrare, made her TV acting debut in the Batman episode "The Cat's Meow," which featured pop duo Chad & Jeremy.

Ferrare made her feature film debut in The Impossible Years (1968) opposite David Niven, playing the daughter of a university psychology professor. This was followed by a main role in the Western drama J. W. Coop (1972), directed by and starring Cliff Robertson and Geraldine Page. She subsequently starred as the titular character in Juan López Moctezuma's horror film Mary, Mary, Bloody Mary (1975), portraying a vampire roving a Mexican village.

In 1975, Ferrare worked as the spokesperson for Max Factor.

Ferrare was co-host of A.M. Los Angeles on KABC-TV for several years during the late 1980s. She also co-hosted the ABC television series The Home Show for several months in early 1989. Cristina played herself in the second episode of the forth and final season of It's Garry Shandling's Show for November 1989. In 1990, Ferrare was featured in print advertising for Ultra Slim-Fast. She was also a substitute co-host on Good Morning America and Live! with Regis and Kathie Lee. In 1993, she was guest host for two episodes of Vicki!.

=== Home and Family Show ===
From November 1996 – August 1998, Ferrare co-hosted Home & Family on The Family Channel; the show ended on August 14, 1998, just one day before the channel became Fox Family Channel, which included a major restructuring of the network's programming. She later co-hosted a revived version of the show from 2012 to 2016 with Mark Steines on its new network Hallmark Channel.

Ferrare's departure was abrupt and the audience was not given any explanation nor any notice prior to her departure. On June 21, 2016, Hallmark Channel confirmed that Ferrare would no longer co-host the show with Steines; former co-host of The View Debbie Matenopoulos was named as her replacement. In a statement via Facebook, Ferrare addressed her exit: "It's really very simple, Home and Family will have a season 5 which I am so happy for and the Network decided that they want a new co-host and that will be Debbie. She will do a great job!"

=== Designing ===
She and her mother created the Cristina Ferrare Collection, producing jewelry that, in 2002, was sold in seven Neiman Marcus stores and was "beginning to pop up in specialty shops throughout the country."

=== Big Bowl of Love ===
Ferrare premiered in her new show Big Bowl of Love on Oprah Winfrey's network (OWN) on January 3, 2011, with Iron Chef Cat Cora as the show's first guest. Big Bowl of Love follows Ferrare cooking recipes alongside her friends, family, and other guests.

== Personal life ==
According to Ferrare, in her book Realistically Ever After, she married a man in 1969 and annulled it six weeks later. In 1973, she married automobile executive John DeLorean. He had earlier adopted a son Zachary while single, and she also adopted him. Later, they had a daughter, Kathryn. Ferrare and DeLorean divorced in 1985 after several years of his business struggling and him being charged with but found not guilty of cocaine trafficking charges, . Two weeks later, on April 21, 1985, she married entertainment industry executive Anthony Thomopoulos.

Ferrare was portrayed by Isabel Arraiza in the 2018 film Driven and by Morena Baccarin in the 2019 documentary Framing John DeLorean.

Her niece (her sister's daughter) is actress Danielle Bisutti.

== Filmography ==
Year	Title	Role	Notes	Ref.
1968	The Impossible Years	Linda Kingsley		
1972	J. W. Coop	Bean		
1975	Mary, Mary, Bloody Mary	Mary		
1993	Perry Mason: The Case of the Telltale Talk Show Host	Judith Jansen		
2005	The Weather Man	Herself		

== Bibliography ==
- Ferrare, Cristina (1984). Cristina Ferrare Style: How to Have It in Every Part of Your Life. New York City, New York: Simon & Schuster. ISBN 978-0-671-46849-1.
- Ferrare, Cristina (1998). Cristina Ferrare's Family Entertaining. New York City, New York: Golden Books. ISBN 978-0-307-44014-3.
- Ferrare, Cristina (1999). Okay, So I Don't Have a Headache: What I Learned (and What All Women Need to Know) about PMS, Hormones, Stress, Diet, Menopause--and Sex. New York City, New York: St. Martin's Press. ISBN 978-1-582-38029-2.
- Ferrare, Cristina (2004). Realistically Ever After: Finding Happiness When He's Not Prince Charming, You're Not Snow White, and Life's Not a Fairy Tale. New York City, New York: Rodale. ISBN 978-1-579-54947-3.
- Ferrare, Cristina (2011). Cristina Ferrare's Big Bowl of Love: Delight Family and Friends with More Than 150 Simple, Fabulous Recipes. New York City, New York: Sterling Epicure. ISBN 978-1-402-78644-0.
- Ferrare, Cristina (2018). Food for Thought: Recipes for Ultimate Mind and Body Health. New York City, New York: Post Hill Press. ISBN 978-1-642-93057-3.
