= George Barrington =

Irish pickpocket

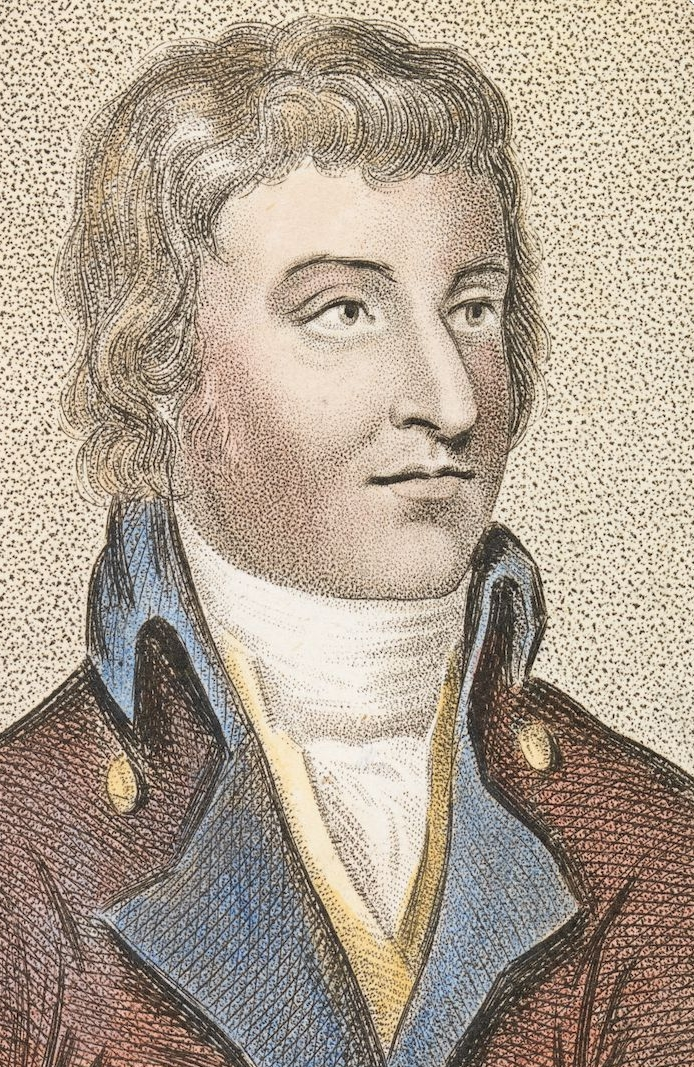
- Born: 14 May 1755; Maynooth, County Kildare, Ireland
- Died: 27 December 1804 (aged 49); Parramatta, New South Wales
- Occupation: Pickpocket
- Criminal charge: Theft
- Criminal penalty: Seven years' transportation
- Partner: Yeariana

George Barrington (14 May 1755 – 27 December 1804) (real name Waldron) was an Irish pickpocket, popular London socialite, Australian pioneer (following his transportation to Botany Bay), and author. His escapades, arrests, and trials were widely chronicled in the London press of his day. For over a century following his death, and still perhaps today, he was most celebrated for the couplet “True patriots all; for be it understood, We left our country for our country’s good”. The attribution of the line to Barrington is considered apocryphal since the 1911 discovery by Sydney book collector Alfred Lee of the 1802 book in which the line first appeared.

== Personal life ==
Barrington in The Chronicles of Newgate, ed. Arthur Griffiths.

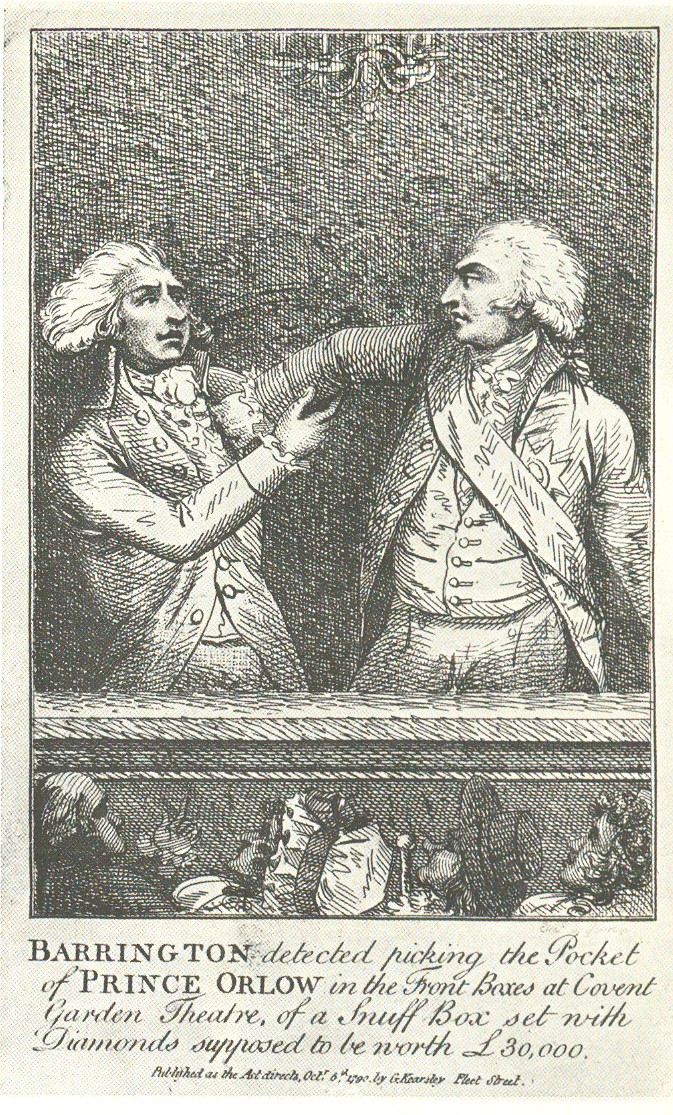
George Barrington caught picking the pocket of Count Orlov, Covent Garden Theatre

Barrington was born at Maynooth in County Kildare, son either of a working silversmith named Waldron, or of Captain Barrington, an English troop commander.

At some point in the 1785–1787 period he married and the couple had a child, but the names of the wife and child, and their eventual fates, are not known.

During the beginnings of his prosperity in Australia, Barrington cohabited with a native woman, Yeariana, who soon left him to return to her family. Barrington said that Yeariana possessed "a form that might serve as a perfect model for the most scrupulous statuary."

== Career ==
=== Pickpocketing ===
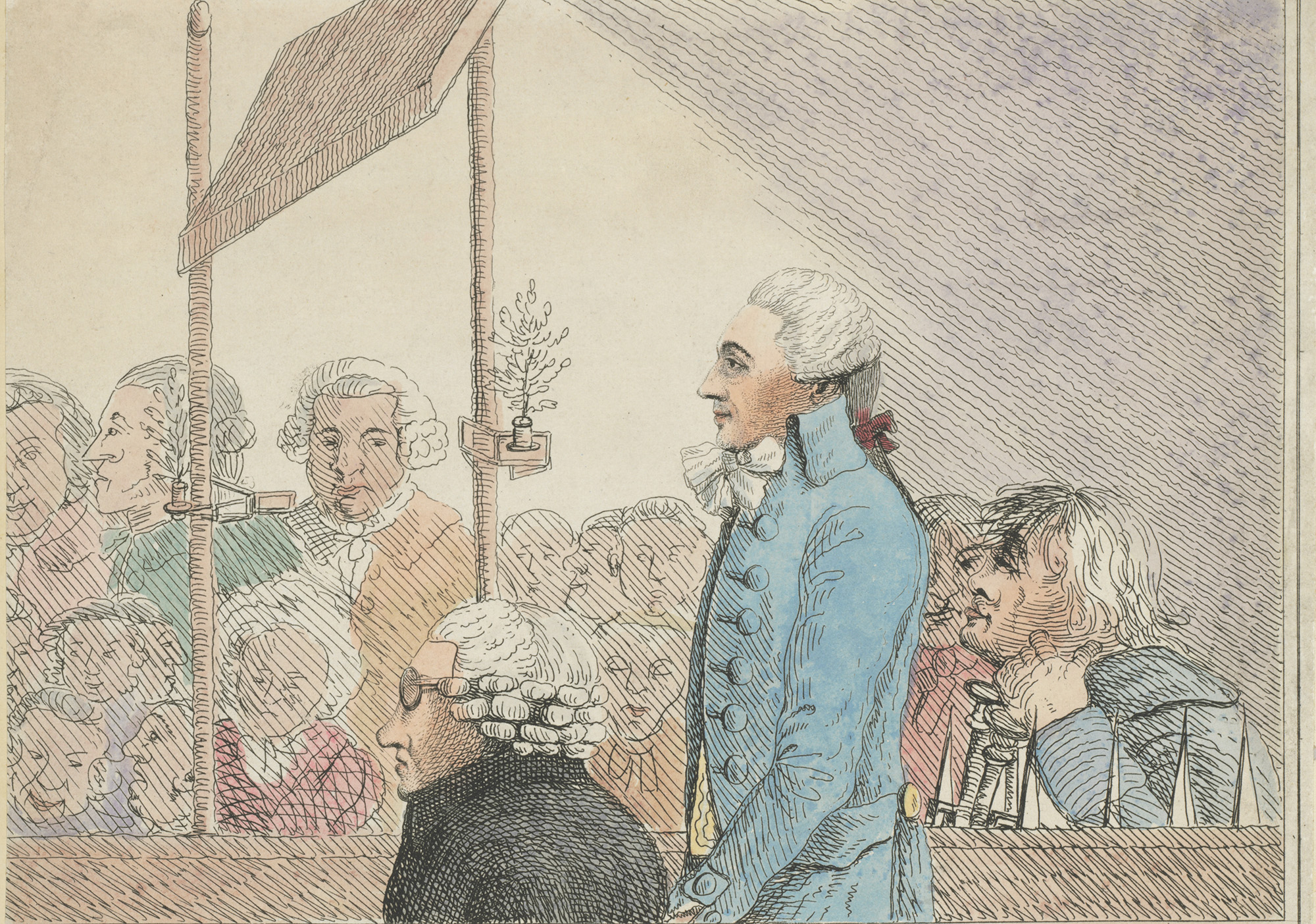
George Barrington being tried at The Old Bailey, 17 September 1790

In 1771 he robbed his schoolmaster at Dublin and ran away from school, becoming a member of a touring theatrical company at Drogheda under the assumed name of Barrington. At the Limerick races he joined the manager of the company in picking pockets. The manager was detected and sentenced to transportation, and Barrington fled to London, where he assumed clerical dress and continued his pickpocketing. At Covent Garden theatre he robbed the Russian Count Orlov of a snuffbox, said to be worth £30,000. He was detected and arrested but, as Count Orlov declined to prosecute, was discharged, though subsequently he was sentenced to three years' hard labour for pocket-picking at Drury Lane theatre.

On his release, he was again caught at his old practices and sentenced to five years' hard labour, but influence secured his release on the condition that he leave England. He accordingly went for a short time to Dublin, and then returned to London, where he was once more detected pocket-picking, and, in 1790, sentenced to seven years' transportation.

=== At Botany Bay ===
One account states that on the voyage out to Botany Bay a conspiracy was hatched by the convicts on board to seize the ship. Barrington disclosed the plot to the captain, and the latter, on reaching New South Wales, reported him favourably to the authorities, with the result that in 1792 Barrington obtained a warrant of emancipation (the first issued), becoming subsequently superintendent of convicts and later high constable of Parramatta.

Barrington died at Parramatta in 1804.

== Latter-day renown ==
Whatever doubts may exist about the authorship of the "Prologue", its most famous line has become an iconic part of Australian culture (for example, it is quoted in the film Breaker Morant and provides the title of the play Our Country's Good). It begins:

From distant climes, o'er wide-spread seas, we come,
Though not with much éclat or beat of drum,
True patriots all: for, be it understood:
We left our country for our country's good.

== Works ==
Barrington employed the artist and engraver Vincent Woodthorpe to illustrate these works,

- A Voyage to New South Wales. In two volumes, the first of which is "A Voyage to Botany Bay", London, 1795 and 1801.
- The History of New South Wales. London, 1802 and 1810.

== Film ==
In 2022, the two German artists Matthias Meyer and Alexander Rischer released their experimental documentary film "The Ballad of George Barrington", which traces the life of George Barrington. The film had its premiere on 25 November 2022 at the Metropolis Kino in Hamburg.

== See also ==
- List of convicts transported to Australia
