= Partial verdict =

Type of verdict

A partial verdict occurs when a judge permits a jury to return verdicts on fewer than all of the counts it has to decide, though it has not yet determined the remainder (and, it is possible, may never so determine). The verdicts the jury has reached may or may not be announced immediately. The term may also be used in criminal or civil procedure. In a criminal case, it occurs when the judge or jury finds the defendant guilty or not guilty on some, but not all, of the charges against them.

== See also ==
- Hung jury
- Double jeopardy
- Jury trial
