= Alucarda =

1977 film by Juan López Moctezuma

- Theatrical release poster
- Spanish: Alucarda, la hija de las tinieblas
- Directed by: Juan López Moctezuma
- Screenplay by: Alexis Arroyo; Juan López Moctezuma
- Story by: Alexis Arroyo; Tita Arroyo; Juan López Moctezuma; Yolanda López Moctezuma
- Based on: Carmilla (1872 novella) by Sheridan Le Fanu
- Produced by: Max Guefen; Juan López Moctezuma
- Starring: Tina Romero; Claudio Brook; Susana Kamini; David Silva
- Distributed by: Yuma Films; Films 75
- Release dates: 10 March 1977 (Paris); 26 January 1978 (Mexico)
- Running time: 78 minutes
- Country: Mexico
- Language: English

Alucarda (Spanish: Alucarda, la hija de las tinieblas, lit. 'Alucarda, the daughter of darkness') is a 1977 English-language Mexican supernatural horror film co-written and directed by Juan López Moctezuma, and starring Tina Romero, Claudio Brook, Susana Kamini, and David Silva. A loose adaptation of Sheridan Le Fanu's 1872 novella Carmilla, it revolves around two teenage orphan girls living in a Catholic convent, who unleash a demonic force and become possessed.

The film premiered at the 1977 Paris International Festival of Fantastic and Science-Fiction Film, and had a brief Mexican theatrical release in a censored version. It was released theatrically in France on 26 December 1977. Though not well received in Mexico, it received some acclaim internationally. Since its release, Alucarda has achieved cult status.

The film was released under several alternate titles on home video in English-speaking countries, including Innocents from Hell and Sisters of Satan. The film has been noted by film scholars for its themes regarding national tradition versus modernity, as well as the tensions between science and religion, and the failures of both. Because of its depiction of nuns in emotionally-heightened, supernatural situations, the film has been associated with the nunsploitation genre. It is also widely regarded as one of the best Mexican horror films of all time.

== Plot ==
In 1850, Lucy Westenra gives birth to a daughter, Alucarda, in a derelict colonial palace in the woods. Immediately after the child is born, Lucy begs a hunchbacked Romani to bring Alucarda to a nearby stone-walled convent inhabited by an order of Catholic nuns, as she fears the devil will claim her daughter. As the Romani flees with the infant, a demonic voice emanates throughout the palace as Lucy dies of complications from childbirth.

15 years later, a teenaged Alucarda still resides at the convent. Alucarda swiftly takes an interest in Justine, a new orphan her age who has arrived, and is eager to become her friend. Alucarda quickly refers to Justine as her sister. While playing in a forest, Alucarda and Justine witness a band of Romani holding a funeral procession. One of the men—the hunchback who helped deliver Alucarda—offers to sell Alucarda an amulet. Shortly after, the girls stumble upon the abandoned palace, and wander into a crypt. There, Alucarda professes her love for Justine, and the two make a pact that they shall die together. In the crypt, they unwittingly open the grave of Alucarda's mother, and are immediately overcome by a powerful supernatural force that reduces Alucarda to tears.

Later, during mass, Justine inexplicably faints. While Alucarda tends to Justine in her room, she goes into a fit and begins wildly reciting the names of demons. The hunchback Romani appears in the room as Alucarda invokes Satan, and the girls, nude, perform a blood ritual. Meanwhile, while praying, Sister Angélica has a vision of Alucarda and Justine performing a Satanic ritual with the Romani in the woods and engaging in a mass orgy. During the ritual, one of the priestesses is stricken down by Sister Angélica's invocation of God, and is killed.

The next day during school, Alucarda and Justine begin chanting and professing their dedication to Satan, much to the horror of the nuns and their peers. The nuns make several unsuccessful attempts to have the girls repent, one of which ends with Alucarda attempting to denounce Father Lázaro as a hypocrite during confession. Lázaro and the nuns, horrified by this, engage in a mass flogging of each other as punishment for their failure to save the girls from demonic influence. After, Lázaro concludes they must perform an exorcism of Justine, who has grown progressively ill. During the exorcism, they bind Justine to a cross and poke at her flesh with instruments, eventually causing her to bleed to death. Dr. Oszek, arriving to examine Justine, walks in on the exorcism and is horrified by what he sees. Deeming the practice archaic and sadistic, Oszek takes Alucarda with him, fearing for her life.

Alucarda awakens in Dr. Oszek's home, frightened and confused, and is comforted by his blind daughter, Daniela. Meanwhile, Oszek is summoned back to the convent, where the nuns have found that Justine's corpse has disappeared. Upstairs, Sister Germana is found inexplicably burned alive. When her body reanimates, Father Lázaro bludgeons and ultimately decapitates her. The event challenges Oszek's science-based beliefs, and he flees back home, fearing for Daniela's safety; upon arriving, he finds Alucarda and Daniela are both gone.

Oszek is led to the abandoned crypt by the nuns, who suspect Alucarda might have gone there. Inside, Sister Angélica finds Justine's body lying in a blood-filled coffin. Now a vampire, Justine attacks Sister Angélica, but Angélica manages to stop the attack by praying. Oszek interjects and pours holy water on Justine, driving her into a fit, and she bites Angélica's neck before disintegrating. Followed by Oszek, several monks carry Angélica's body back to the convent, where Alucarda has arrived with Daniela. Using supernatural powers, Alucarda begins destroying the convent and causing various clergy to spontaneously combust in the grotto. Upon witnessing Angélica's corpse, Alucarda is suddenly overcome with sorrow, and goes into a fit of rage at the base of a burning crucifix in the chapel. After she collapses, Alucarda's body disappears into the ground as Father Lázaro and Oszek look on.

== Cast ==
- Tina Romero as Alucarda / Lucy Westenra
- Susana Kamini as Justine
- David Silva as Father Lázaro
- Claudio Brook as Dr. Oszek / Hunchbacked Romani
- Lily Garza as Daniela Oszek
- Tina French as Sister Angélica
- Birgitta Segerskog as Mother Superior
- Adriana Roel as Sister Germana
- Martin LaSalle as Brother Felipe
- Edith González as Village Girl (uncredited)

== Themes ==
"In Alucarda, the triumph of science or religion is turned on its head. The world in crisis defined by the unreasonable, the unexplainable, and the unsolvable is not salvaged by reason or faith."

— Film scholar Doyle Greene on the film's overarching themes

Some scholars, such as Frances Di Lauro, have noted that Alucarda is undergirded by anti-government and anticlerical sentiments that are manifested in the exaggerated idolatry, representations of clerics as tyrants and persecutors, and overt iconoclasm. Tensions between modernity and tradition are also prominent themes. Film scholar Doyle Green characterizes the film as an "apocalyptic collision of modernity and tradition in a perpetual Dark Age." Scholars Raúl Rodríguez-Hernández and Claudia Schaefer contextualize this clash (and the film's representation of it) within Mexico's national history, exemplifying "literary and cinematic representations of persistent clashes between tradition and modernity, myth and reason. The added dimension of visibly transgressive actions taken by two young women against teachings, structure, and moral guiding principles of the church speaks directly to a post-1968 generation that celebrates the body but has lost faith in the society's master narratives." Aesthetically, Rodríguez-Hernández and Schaefer note visual references to Francisco Goya's Los caprichos, specifically during the sequence in which Alucarda and Justine engage in the blood ritual with the hunchbacked Romani.

Green also interprets Alucarda as being preoccupied with themes of mental illness and the handling of it within the Catholic Church. Green states that, in the film, "the convent becomes a psychiatric domain without psychiatry", a theme also explored significantly in Ken Russell's The Devils (1971). Because of these shared depictions of Catholic clergy—specifically nuns—in the context of hysteria, Green notes that both films became associated with the nunsploitation genre. The tension between science and religious dogma has been noted as another theme, specifically in the final act, during which the logically minded Dr. Oszek—a man of science—is faced with supernatural occurrences he cannot rationalize.

Alucarda is also associated with the vampire movie genre, although it is not a traditional vampire movie. Many critics have noted its similarities to Joseph Sheridan Le Fanu's early vampire novella Carmilla, especially the romantic relationship between the main female characters. According to director López Moctezuma, "the film draws on the vampire tradition, and in a way the protagonist is a female vampire … but not in the sense of a blood drinker." The title of the film and the name of its eponymous character is derived from Dracula spelled backwards, a derivation also used in the form of "Alucard" in other vampire-related media.

== Production ==
Production for Alucarda began in August 1975. Though a Mexican production, the film was shot in English, which actors Tina Romero, Claudio Brook, and Susana Kamini were all fluent in. The film was shot at Estudios América in Mexico City.

== Release ==
Alucarda opened at the Paris International Festival of Fantastic Film in March 1977. In Mexico, the film screened in theaters for approximately two weeks and was partly censored. The film did not receive a theatrical release in the United States, though it was distributed for cinemas in France, released on 26 December 1977.

In February 2023, the IFC Center screened a digitally restored version of the film.

=== Home media ===
The film was released on home video under the title Sisters of Satan in the United States in 1978, and subsequently released on video under various titles including Sisters of Satan, Innocents from Hell, and Mark of the Devil 3.

Mondo Macabro released a special edition DVD edition of Alucarda in 2002, which features a documentary on Moctezuma, as well as an interview with director Guillermo del Toro, an admirer of the film.

== Reception ==
Alucarda was not favorably received in Mexico, though it did receive some critical notice internationally. Mexican film critic Leonardo García Tsao declared it one of the ten worst films he had ever seen.

Columnist Michael Weldon of the Psychotronic Video Guide wrote that the film was "The strongest, most imaginative, and visual witch movie since Ken Russell's The Devils."

David Wilt of the University of Maryland's Mexican Film Resource Page notes that the film is "visually, a rather stylish and interesting picture," comparing it to the work of Alejandro Jodorowsky. In 2023, David Wilt of the British Film Institute lauded the film as "a stylish demonic possession tale" and declared it a masterpiece.

Carlos Aguilar, writing for Vulture, praised Romero's lead performance, writing that her "raw portrayal of a mind ravaged by a diabolical energy hits with hair-raising strength."

Mexican filmmaker Guillermo del Toro has also expressed his appreciation for the film and other works from director Juan López Moctezuma.

== In popular culture ==
Swedish rock band Year of the Goat titled a song after this movie.

== See also ==
- Satánico pandemonium — a 1975 Mexican horror film with thematic similarities

== Sources ==
- Aubrey, James (2020). "Unqueering Child Vampire Love in Let the Right One In". In Aubrey, James (ed.). Vampire Films Around the World: Essays on the Cinematic Undead of Sixteen Cultures. Jefferson, North Carolina: McFarland. pp. 245–259. ISBN 978-1-476-63986-4.
- Di Lauro, Frances (2006). "Moctezuma's Revenge: Iconoclasm in Film". In Di Lauro, Frances (ed.). Through A Glass Darkly: Reflections of the Sacred. Sydney, Australia: Sydney University Press. ISBN 978-1-920-89854-0.
- Greene, Doyle (2007). The Mexican Cinema of Darkness: A Critical Study of Six Landmark Horror and Exploitation Films, 1969-1988. Jefferson, North Carolina: McFarland. ISBN 978-0-786-42999-8.
- Maxford, Howard (2019). Hammer Complete: The Films, the Personnel, the Company. Jefferson, North Carolina: McFarland. ISBN 978-1-476-62914-8.
- Rodríguez-Hernández, Raúl; Schaefer, Claudia (2019). The Supernatural Sublime: The Wondrous Ineffability of the Everyday in Films from Mexico and Spain. Lincoln, Nebraska: University of Nebraska Press. ISBN 978-1-496-21499-7.
- Shipka, Danny; Beliveau, Ralph, eds. (2017). International Horror Film Directors: Global Fear. Intellect Ltd. ISBN 978-1-783-20653-7.
- Silver, Alain; Ursini, James (1997). The Vampire Film: From Nosferatu to Interview with the Vampire (Third ed.). New York City, New York: Limelight Editions. ISBN 978-0-879-10266-1.
- St-Georges, Charles (2018). Haunted Families and Temporal Normativity in Hispanic Horror Films: Troubling Timelines. Lanham, Maryland: Lexington Books. ISBN 978-1-498-56336-9.
- Stine, Scott Aaron (2015). The Gorehound's Guide to Splatter Films of the 1960s and 1970s. Jefferson, North Carolina: McFarland. ISBN 978-0-786-49140-7.
