= Fantafestival =

Italian film festival

- A version of the festival's logo, featuring classic fumetto character Diabolik
- Location: Rome, Italy
- Founded: 1981
- Founded by: Luigi Cozzi, Alberto Ravaglioli
- Awards: Pipistrello d'oro (English: Golden Bat)
- Directors: Marcello Rossi, Luca Ruocco
- Language: International
- Website: fanta-festival.it

The Mostra internazionale del film di fantascienza e del fantastico (English: International Science Fiction and Fantasy Film Show), commonly known as Fantafestival, is a film festival devoted to science fiction, fantasy and horror film that has been held annually in Italy since 1981.

Fantafestival takes place every year in Rome. In the past years, while maintaining its headquarters in Rome, some editions were held in contemporary in different Italian cities like Milan, Naples, Genoa, Verona, Parma and Ravenna.

It was established in 1981 by Alberto Ravaglioli with Luigi Cozzi, supported since 1983 by Adriano Pintaldi; from 2019 to 2023 the festival was directed by Michele De Angelis and Simone Starace. Since 2024 the directors are Marcello Rossi and Luca Ruocco (who also directed the 2018 edition). For more than 40 years, Fantafestival has been one of the leading Italian events specialized in fantastic films and one of the most important international events of this kind. It has presented and launched in Italy many filmmakers who later would become among the most popular in the fantastic film world. The list of guests of honor includes all the biggest names in the genre, from actors such as Vincent Price, Christopher Lee, Peter Cushing, John Carradine, Rutger Hauer, Robert Englund, to directors and producers like Roger Corman, Freddie Francis, George A. Romero, Alejandro Jodorowsky, Sam Raimi, Peter Jackson, and among Italians, Lucio Fulci, Riccardo Freda, Dario Argento and Lamberto Bava.

The festival is a founding and affiliated member of the European Fantastic Film Festivals Federation.

== Awards ==
1981

- Best film: Somewhere in Time, directed by Jeannot Szwarc
- Best actor: Christopher Reeve – Somewhere in Time
- Best actress: Lily Tomlin – The Incredible Shrinking Woman
- Best cinematography: Edward Scaife – The Water Babies
- Best special effects: Scared to Death
- Best thriller: Lady Stay Dead, directed by Terry Bourke
- Audience award: The Monster Club, directed by Roy Ward Baker

1982

- Best film: Malevil, directed by Christian de Chalonge; Schlock, directed by John Landis
- Best director: Olle Hellbom – The Brothers Lionheart
- Best actor: George C. Scott – The Changeling
- Best actress: Bella Tanay – The Fortress
- Best special effects: Inseminoid
- Best Children's Film: Chronopolis, directed by Piotr Kamler; Les Maîtres du temps, directed by René Laloux, Jean Giraud

1983

- Best film: Panik, directed by Sándor Reisenbüchler
- Best director: King Hu – Da lunhui
- Best actor: Oliver Reed – Dr. Heckyl and Mr. Hype
- Best screenplay: William Dear and Michael Nesmith – Timerider: The Adventure of Lyle Swann
- Best cinematography: Louis Horvath – Strange Invaders

1984

- Best film: The Dead Zone, directed by David Cronenberg
- Best screenplay: Nico Mastorakis e Fred Perry – Blind Date; Stephen Carpenter, Jeffrey Obrow – The Power
- Best special effects: Tempesta metallica
- Audience award: The Dead Zone, directed by David Cronenberg
- Special award: Quest, directed by Elaine and Saul Bass

1985

- Best film: Philadelphia Experiment, directed by Stewart Raffill
- Best short film: Nausicaä of the Valley of the Wind, directed by Hayao Miyazaki
- Special mention: The Company of Wolves, directed by Neil Jordan
- Seleco award: Giovanotti Mondani Meccanici
- Special award "FantaItaly": Dario Argento – Lamberto Bava – Pupi Avati

1986

- Best film: Re-Animator, directed Stuart Gordon
- Best director: Geoff Murphy – The Quiet Earth
- Best actor: Bruno Lawrence – The Quiet Earth
- Best actress: Alexandra Stewart – Peau d'ange
- Best special effects: Re-Animator
- Best short film: L'ultimo regalo del XX secolo, directed by Massimo Russo
- Best video: Biancaneve, directed by Francesco Abbondati
- Special award: Miguel Bosé – The Knight of the Dragon
- Career award: Val Guest e Michael Carreras

1987

- Best film: Mannequin, directed by Michael Gottlieb
- Best director: Michael Gottlieb – Mannequin
- Best actor: Andrew McCarthy – Mannequin
- Best actress: Yvonne De Carlo – American Gothic
- Best special effects: Dolls
- Best first work: La Casa del Buon Ritorno, directed by Beppe Cino

1988

- Best film: The Navigator: A Medieval Odyssey, directed by Vincent Ward
- Best director: Ching Siu-tung – A Chinese Ghost Story
- Best actor: Nique Needles – As Time Goes By
- Best actress: Mária Varga – A Hungarian Fairy Tale
- Best special effects: Il giorno della crisalide

1989

- Best film: Tetsuo: The Iron Man, directed by Shinya Tsukamoto
- Best director: Ryu Kaneda – Mangetsu no Kuchizuke
- Best actor: Randy Quaid, Bryan Madorsky – Parents
- Best actress: Eri Fukatsu – Mangetsu no kuchizuke
- Best special effects: The Lair of the White Worm
- Special mention: The Dreaming, directed by Mario Andreacchio
- Audience award: Bad Taste, directed by Peter Jackson
- Career award: Alejandro Jodorowsky

1990

- Best film: Un minuto a mezzanotte, directed by René Manzor
- Best director: René Manzor – Un minuto a mezzanotte
- Best actor: Klaus Maria Brandauer – L'orologiaio
- Best actress: Elena Lokvleva – Lestniza

1991

- Best film: Adrenaline, directed by Renée and Marc Caro
- Best director: Peter Jackson – Meet the Feebles
- Best actor: Lance Henriksen – The Pit and the Pendulum
- Best actress: Heidi (The hippopotamus of the film) – Meet the Feebles
- Best special effects: Meet the Feebles
- Special award: Il gioco delle ombre, directed by Stefano Gabrini – Notte profonda, directed by Fabio Salerno

1992

- Best film: Sleepwalkers, directed by Mick Garris
- Best director: Mick Garris – Sleepwalkers
- Best actor: Tim Balme – Braindead
- Best actress: Alice Krige – Sleepwalkers
- Best screenplay: Stephen King – Sleepwalkers
- Best special effects: Braindead

1993

- Best film: The Dark Half, directed by George A. Romero
- Best director: Brian Henson – The Muppet Christmas Carol
- Best actor: Timothy Hutton – The Dark Half
- Best actress: Nadia Cameron-Blakey – Merlin
- Best screenplay: Paul Hunt and Nick McCarthy – The Dark Half
- Best special effects: Xiao ao jiang hu: Dong Fang Bu Bai
- Special Jury prize: FernGully: The Last Rainforest, directed by Bill Kroyer
- Career award: George A. Romero and Christopher Lee

1994

- Best film: The Bride with White Hair, directed by Ronny Yu
- Best director: Jaroslav Brabec – Krvavý román
- Best actor: The creatures of the film – Freaked
- Best special effects: H.P. Lovecraft's: Necronomicon
- Special award: Dark Waters, directed by Mariano Baino
- Career award: Freddie Francis

1995

- Best film: Nightwatch, directed by Ole Bornedal
- Best director: Guillermo del Toro – Cronos
- Best actor: Robert Englund – The Mangler
- Best actress: Rikke Louise Andersson – Nightwatch
- Best special effects: Death Machine
- Best independent film: Shatter Dead, directed by Scooter McCrae
- Audience award: The Roly Poly Man, directed by Bill Young
- Career award: Ennio Morricone

1996

- Best film: Taxandria, directed by Raoul Servais
- Best director: Óscar Aibar – Atolladero
- Best actor: Doug Bradley – Hellraiser: Bloodline
- Best actress: Whoopi Goldberg – Theodore Rex
- Best special effects: Anthony C. Ferrante – The Dentist
- Lucio Fulci award: Fatal frames: Fotogrammi mortali, directed by Al Festa
- Career award: Riccardo Freda
- Special mention for the Poetic Technology: Mécanomagie, directed by Bady Minck

1997

- Best film: Tromeo and Juliet, directed by Lloyd Kaufman
- Best director: La lengua asesina, directed by Alberto Sciamma
- Best actor: Paolo Rotondo – The Ugly
- Best actress: Isabelle Cyr – Karmina
- Best special effects: Body Troopers

1998

- Best film: Perdita Durango, directed by Álex de la Iglesia
- Best director: Stuart Gordon – The Wonderful Ice Cream Suit
- Best actor: Stuart Townsend – Resurrection Man
- Best actress: Rosie Perez – Perdita Durango
- Best special effects: Shadow Builder
- Best soundtrack: Stefano Mainetti – Tale of the Mummy
- Special Jury prize: to the best production: Daniel Sladek and Silvio Muraglia – Tale of the Mummy
- Special award: Zhi ji sha ren fan, directed by Stephan Yip
- Career award: William Lustig

1999

- Best film: Urban Ghost Story, directed by Geneviève Jolliffe
- Best director: Agustí Villaronga – 99.9
- Best actor: Lars Bom – Skyggen
- Best actress: Heather Ann Foster – Urban Ghost Story
- Best special effects: Skyggen
- Special Jury prize: Kiss My Blood, regia di David Jazay

2000

- Best film: Nameless, directed by Jaume Balagueró
- Best director: Anders Rønnow Klarlund – Besat
- Best actor: Lazar Ristovski – Zbogum na dvaesetiot vek
- Best actress: Jennifer Tilly – Bride of Chucky
- Best special effects: Bride of Chucky
- Special Jury prize: Lighthouse, directed by Simon Hunter
- Audience award: The Convent, directed by Mike Mendez

2001

- Best film: Faust: Love of the Damned, directed by Brian Yuzna
- Best director: Ryuhei Kitamura – Versus
- Best actor: Steve Railsback – In the Light of the Moon
- Best actress: Sally Champlin – In the Light of the Moon
- Best special effects: Faust: Love of the Damned
- Audience award: Faust: Love of the Damned, directed by Brian Yuzna
- Lucio Fulci Award: Pure Blood, directed by Ken Kaplan

2002

- Best film: The Inside Story, directed by Robert Sutherland
- Best director: Robert Sutherland – The Inside Story
- Best actor: Vincent Gallo – Stranded: Náufragos
- Best actress: Maria De Medeiros – Stranded: Náufragos
- Best special effects: Ichi The Killer

2003

- Best film: FeardotCom, directed by William Malone
- Best short film: Space Off, directed by Tino Franco
- Migliori effetti speciali: Red Riding Hood

2004

- Best film: Evilenko, directed by David Grieco

2010

- Special Award: The Museum of Wonders, directed by Domiziano Cristopharo

2012

- Golden Bat for Best Film: The Hounds, directed by Roberto and Maurizio Del Piccolo
- Golden Bat for Best Short Film: The Story of a Mother, directed by Alessandro de Vivo and Ivano Di Natale

2013

- Golden Bat for Best Film: Errors of the Human Body, directed by Eron Sheean
- Golden Bat for Best Short Film: Fist of Jesus, directed by Adrián Cardona e David Muñoz
- Golden Bat for Best Italian Film: P.O.E. – Project Of Evil, directed by Angelo Capasso, Giuseppe Capasso, Domiziano Cristopharo, Donatello Della Pepa, Giuliano Giacomelli, Remy Ginestet, Nathan Nicholovitch, Edo Tagliavini and Alberto Viavattene
- Golden Bat for Best Italian Short Film: Bios, directed by Grazia Tricarico

2014

- Golden Bat for Best Film: Timelapse, directed by Bradley King
- Golden Bat for Best Short Film: Happy Together, directed by Iossif Melamed
- Golden Bat for Best Italian Film: Oltre il Guado, directed by Lorenzo Bianchini
- Golden Bat for Best Italian Short Film: Lievito Madre, directed by Fulvio Risuleo
- Mario Bava Award: The Perfect Husband, directed by Lucas Pavetto
- Mary Shelley Award: Soulmate, directed by Axelle Carolyn

2015

- Golden Bat for Best Film: Landmine Goes Click, directed by Levan Bakhia
- Golden Bat for Best Short Film: The Mill at Calder's End, directed by Kevin McTurk
- Golden Bat for Best Italian Film: Index Zero, directed by Lorenzo Sportiello
- Golden Bat for Best Italian Short Film: Memories, directed by Vincenzo Alfieri
- Mario Bava Award: Fantasticherie di un passeggiatore solitario, directed by Paolo Gaudio

2016

- Golden Bat for Best Film: Testigo Íntimo, directed by Santiago Fernández Calvete
- Golden Bat for Best Short Film: First Like, directed by Alexander Rönnberg
- Golden Bat for Best Italian Film: My Little Sister, directed by Maurizio and Roberto Del Piccolo
- Golden Bat for Best Italian Short Film: Varicella, directed by Fulvio Risuleo
- Mario Bava Award: not given

2017

- Golden Bat for Best Film: Matar A Dios, directed by Caye Casas and Albert Pintó
- Golden Bat for Best Short film: Cuerno Oe Hueso, directed by Adrián López
- Golden Bat for Best Italian Film: Almost Dead, directed by Giorgio Bruno
- Golden Bat for Best Italian Short Film: I vampiri sognano le fate d’inverno?, directed by Claudio Chiaverotti
- Mario Bava Award: The Antithesis, directed by Francesco Mirabelli
- Career award: Luigi Cozzi
- Career award: Biagio Proietti

2018

- Golden Bat for Best Film: Framed, directed by Marc Martínez Jordán
- Golden Bat for Best Short film: The Essence of Everything, directed by Daniele Barbiero
- Mario Bava Award Film: Go home – A casa loro, directed by Luna Gualano
- Mario Bava Award Short Film: Insetti, directed by Gianluca Manzetti
- Audience Award: Nevermind, directed by Eros Puglielli

2019

- Golden Bat for Best Film: Werewolf, directed by Adrian Panek
- Silver Bat for Best Short film: The Nix, directed by Nicolai G.H. Johansen
- Silver Bat for Italian Best Short film: Aria, directed by Brando De Sica
- Career Award: Pupi Avati
- Career Award: Jack Sholder
- Career Award: Christina Lindberg
- Career Award: Eckhart Schmidt
- Career Award: Robert Sigl
- Career Award: Mariano Baino
- Career Award: Coralina Cataldi Tassoni

2020

- Golden Bat for Best Film: Tezuka's Barbara, directed by Macoto Tezka
- Silver Bat for Best Short film: The Appointment, directed by Alexandre Singh

2021

- Golden Bat for Best Film: Beyond the Infinite Two Minutes, directed by Junta Yamaguchi
- Silver Bat for Best Short film: They're Here, directed by Sid Zanforlin
- Silver Bat for Italian Best Short film: The Recycling Man, directed by Carlo Ballauri
- Career Award: Gianni Romoli

2022

- Golden Bat for Best Film: The Day I Found A Girl In The Trash, directed by Michal Krzywicki
- Silver Bat for Best Short film: The Tenant, directed by Lucas Paulino and Ángel Torre
- Silver Bat for Italian Best Short film: Pluto, directed by Ivan Saudelli

2023

- Golden Bat for Best Film: Viking, directed by Stéphane Lafleur
- Special Mention: Eight Eyes, directed by Austin Jennings
- Silver Bat for Best Short film: Flashback Before Death, directed by Hiroyuki Onogawa and Rii Ishihara
- Silver Bat for Italian Best Short film: L'isola dei resuscitati morti, directed by Domenico Montixi
- Career Award: Stefania Casini

2024

- Golden Bat for Best Film: Animale by Emma Benestane
- Golden Bat for Best Short film: Playing God by Matteo Burani
- Golden Bat Career Award: Massimo Antonello Geleng
- Special Mention Silver Bullet: Zeph E. Daniel

2025

- Golden Bat for Best Film: Chain Reactions by Alexandre O. Philippe
- Golden Bat for Best Short film: The Girl Who Cried Pearls by Chris Lavis e Maciek Szczerbowski
- Golden Bat Career Award: Lamberto Bava
- Special Mention Silver Bullet: Richard Stanley
- Special Mention for Special Effects: The Krampus Rises by Andrea Dalfino

== See also ==
- List of fantastic and horror film festivals
