= 17th Saturn Awards =

US film and television award ceremony

- Date: June 26, 1991
- Site: California, U.S.

Highlights
- Most awards: Ghost (3)
- Most nominations: Ghost; Total Recall (9)

The 17th Saturn Awards, honoring the best in science fiction, fantasy and horror film and television in 1989 and 1990, were held on June 26, 1991.

== Winners and nominees ==
Below is a complete list of nominees and winners. Winners are highlighted in bold.

=== Film ===
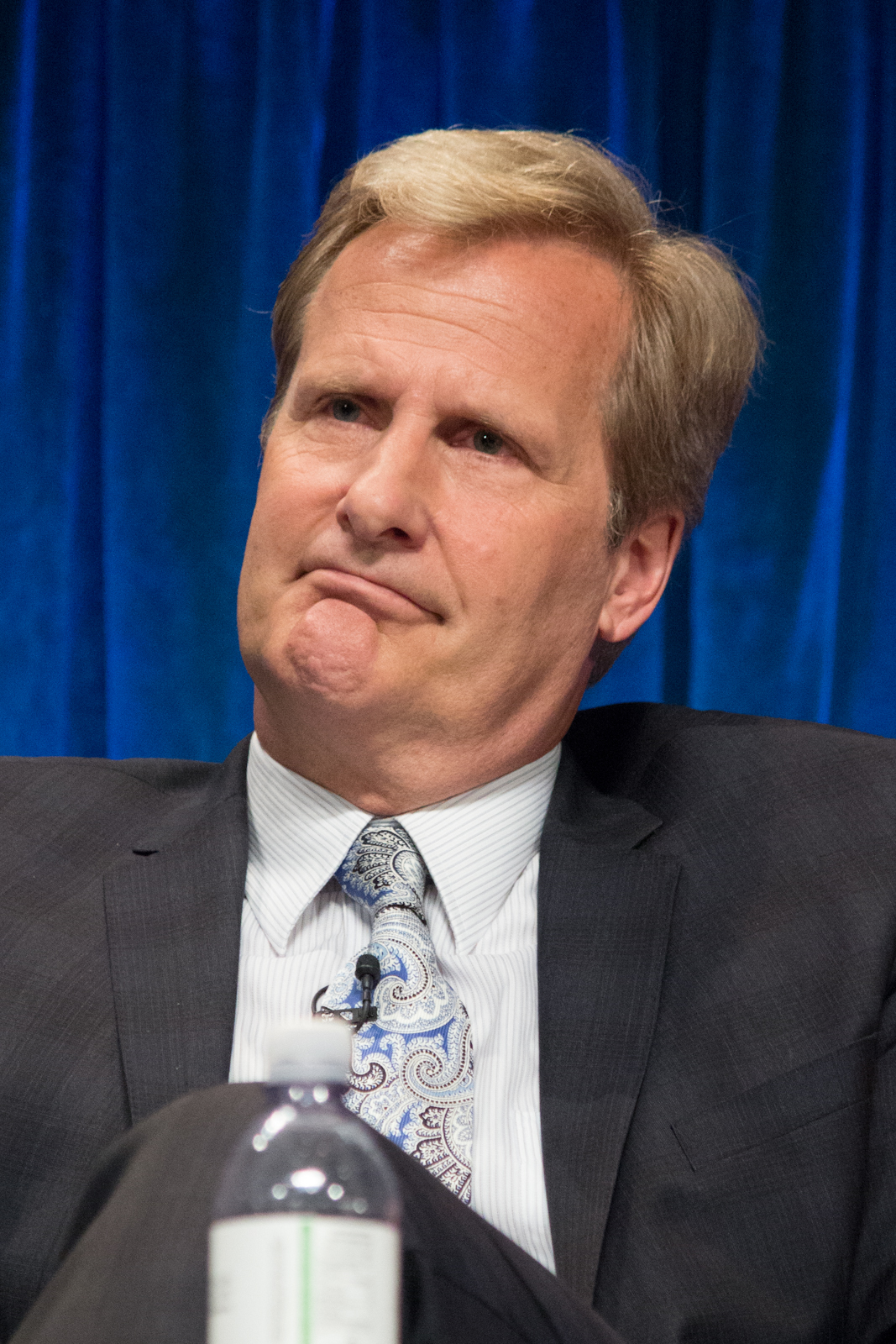
Jeff Daniels, Best Actor winner.

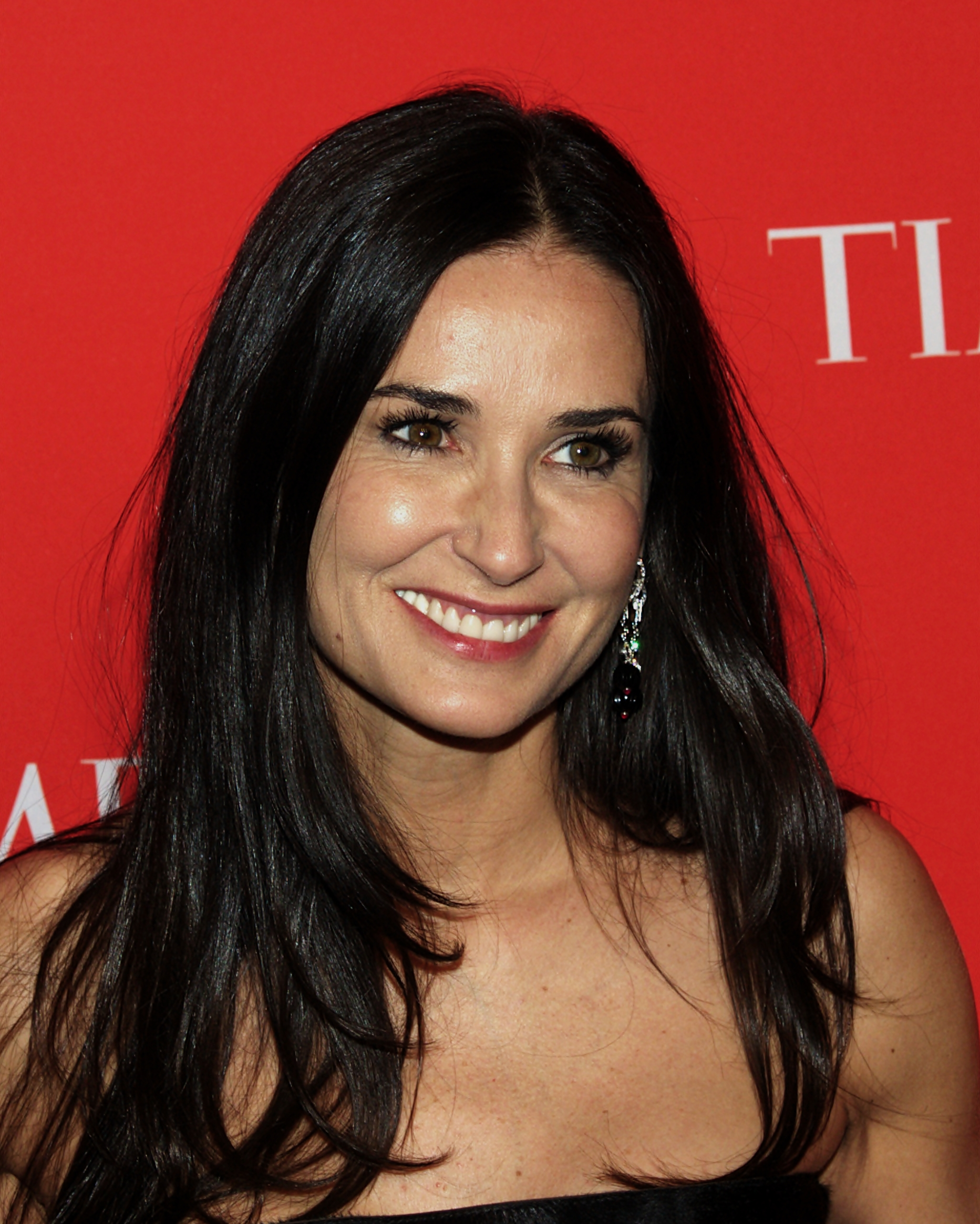
Demi Moore, Best Actress winner.

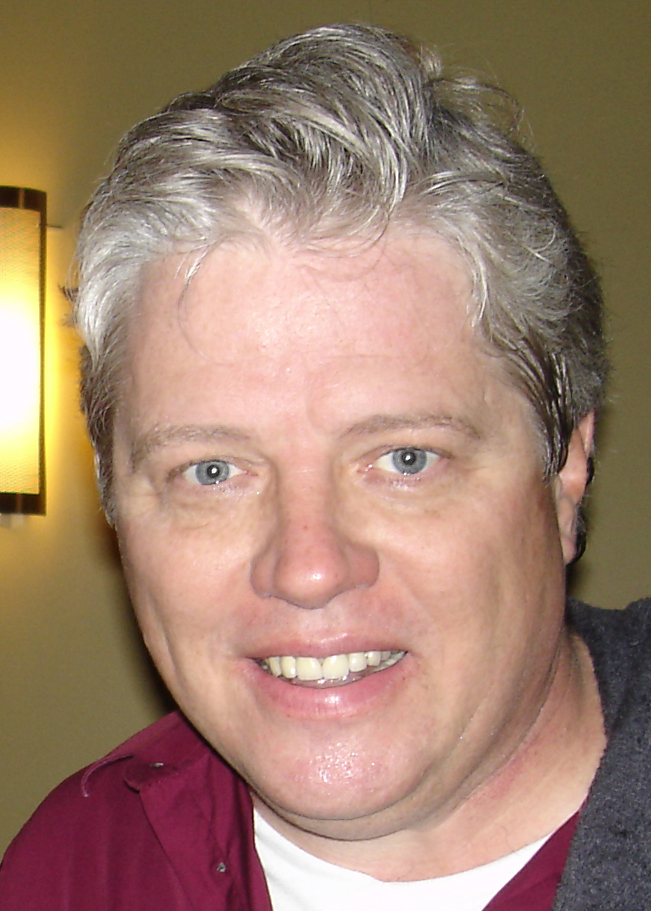
Thomas F. Wilson, Best Supporting Actor winner.

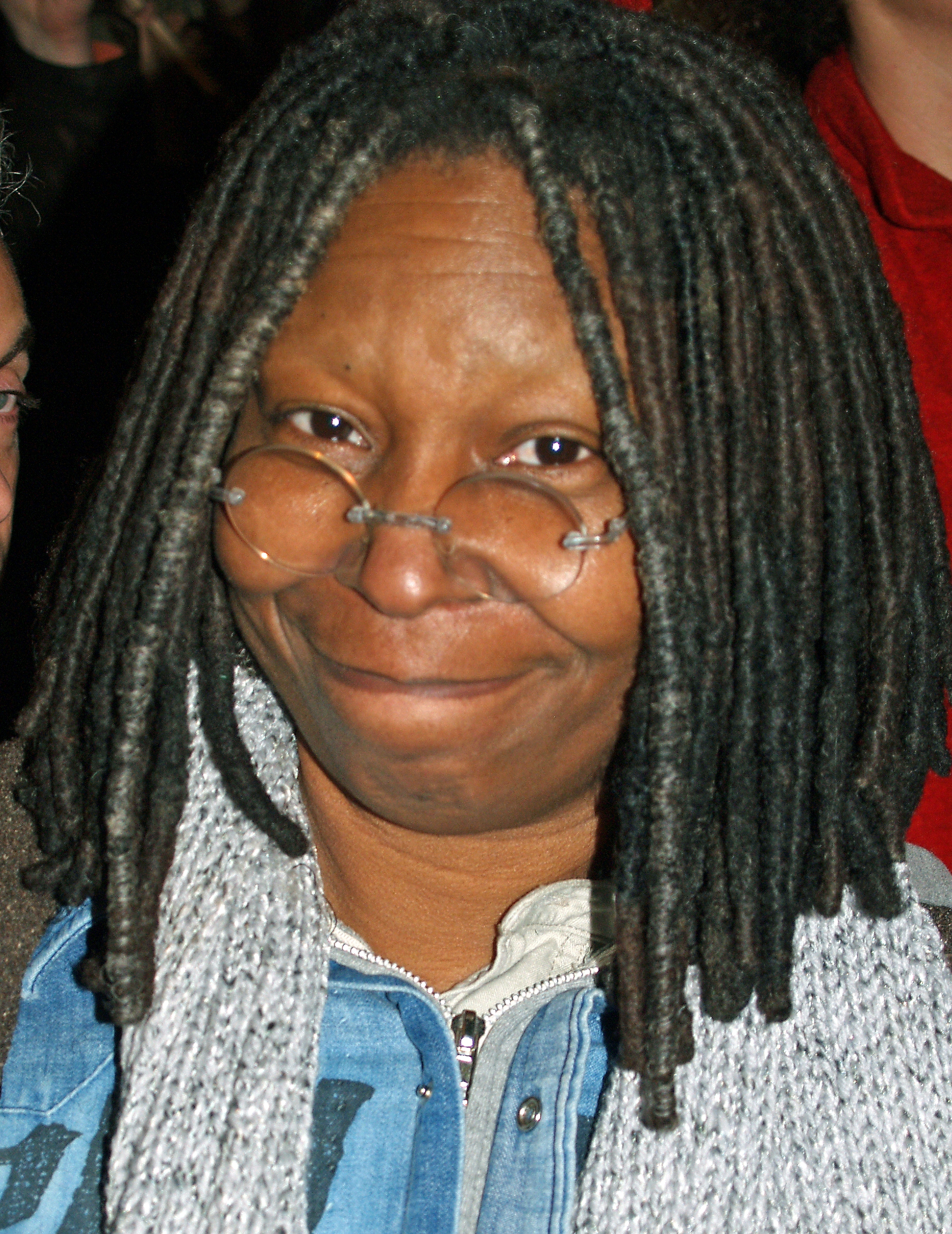
Whoopi Goldberg, Best Supporting Actress winner.

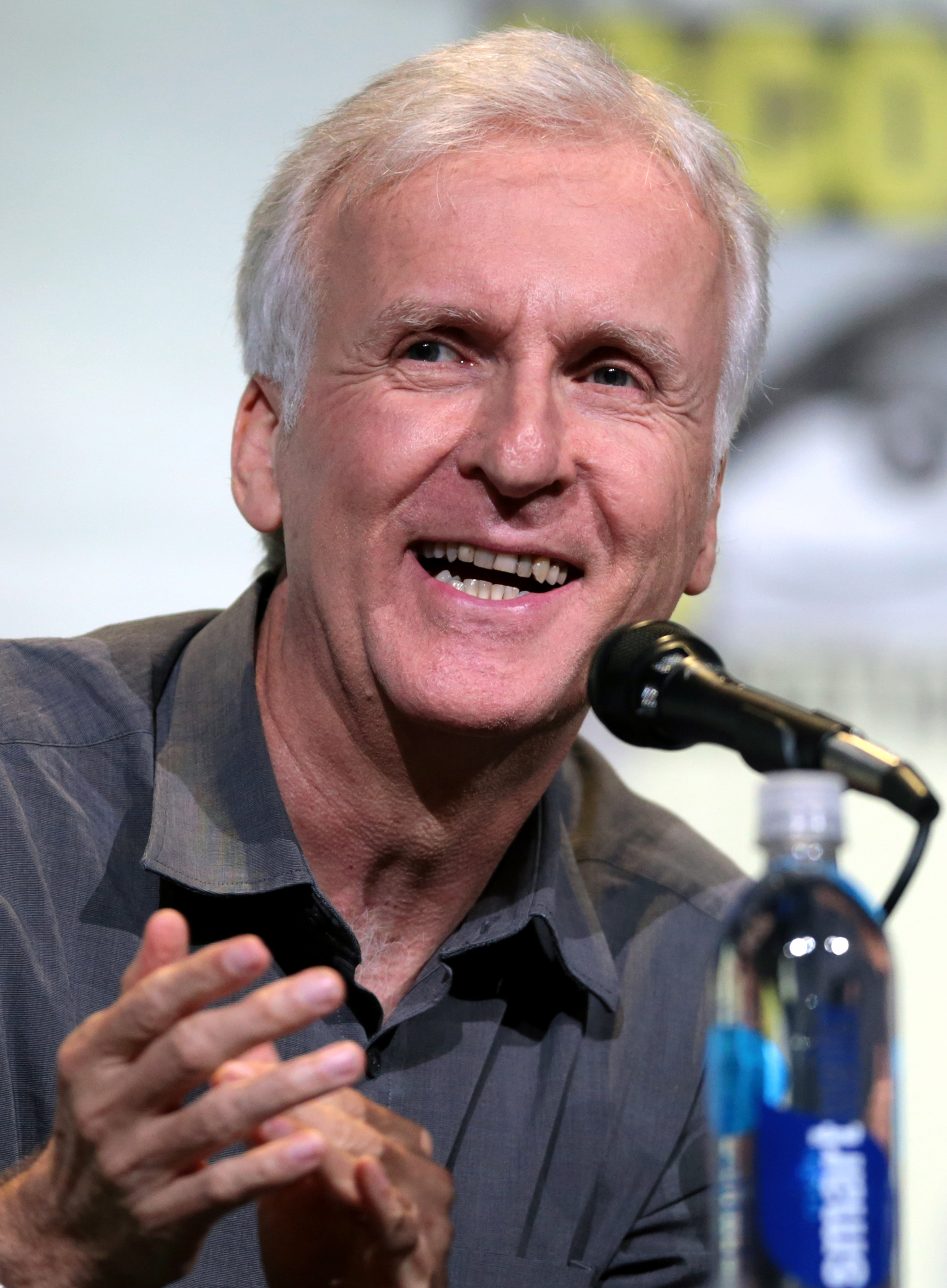
James Cameron, Best Director winner.

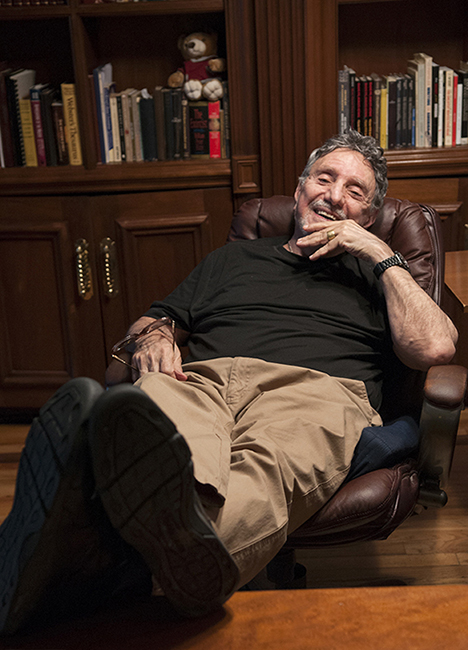
William Peter Blatty, Best Writing winner.

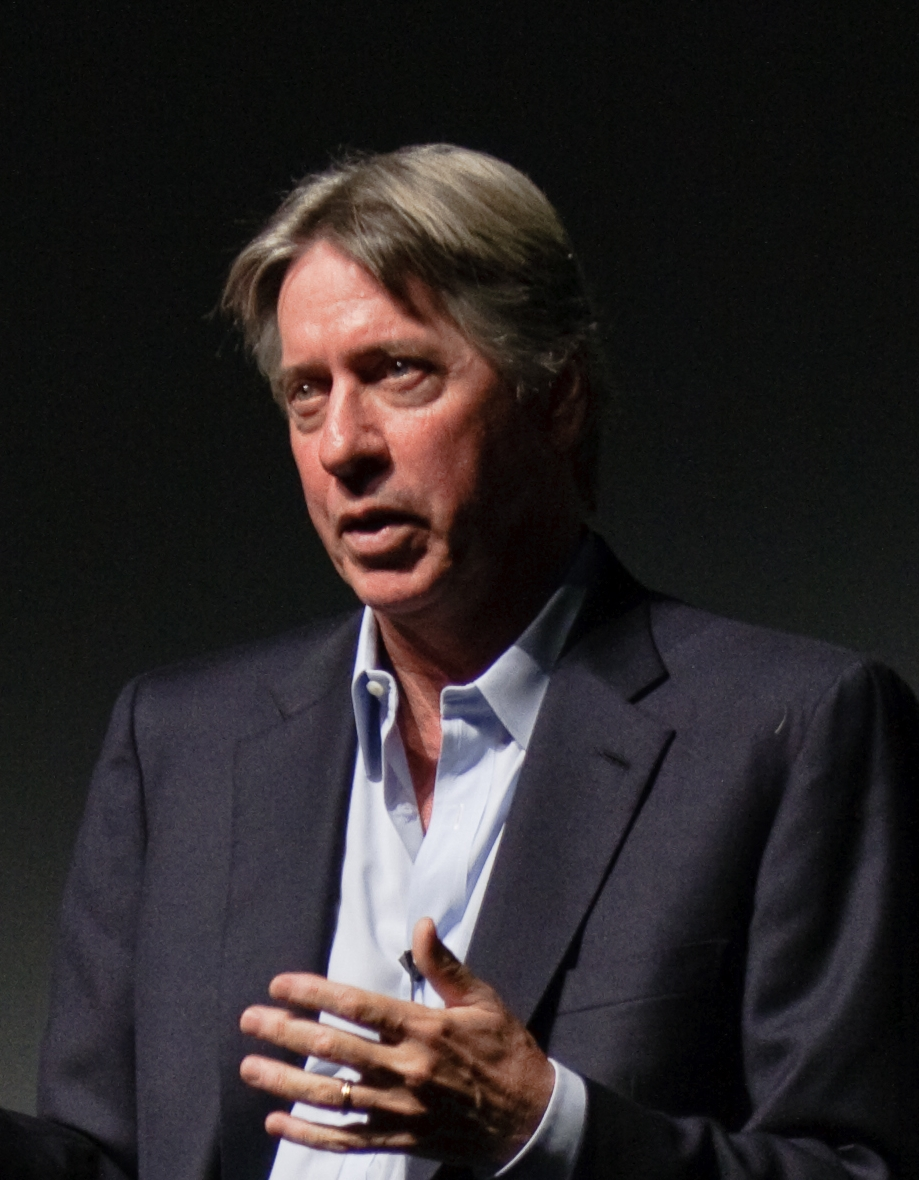
Alan Silvestri, Best Music winner.

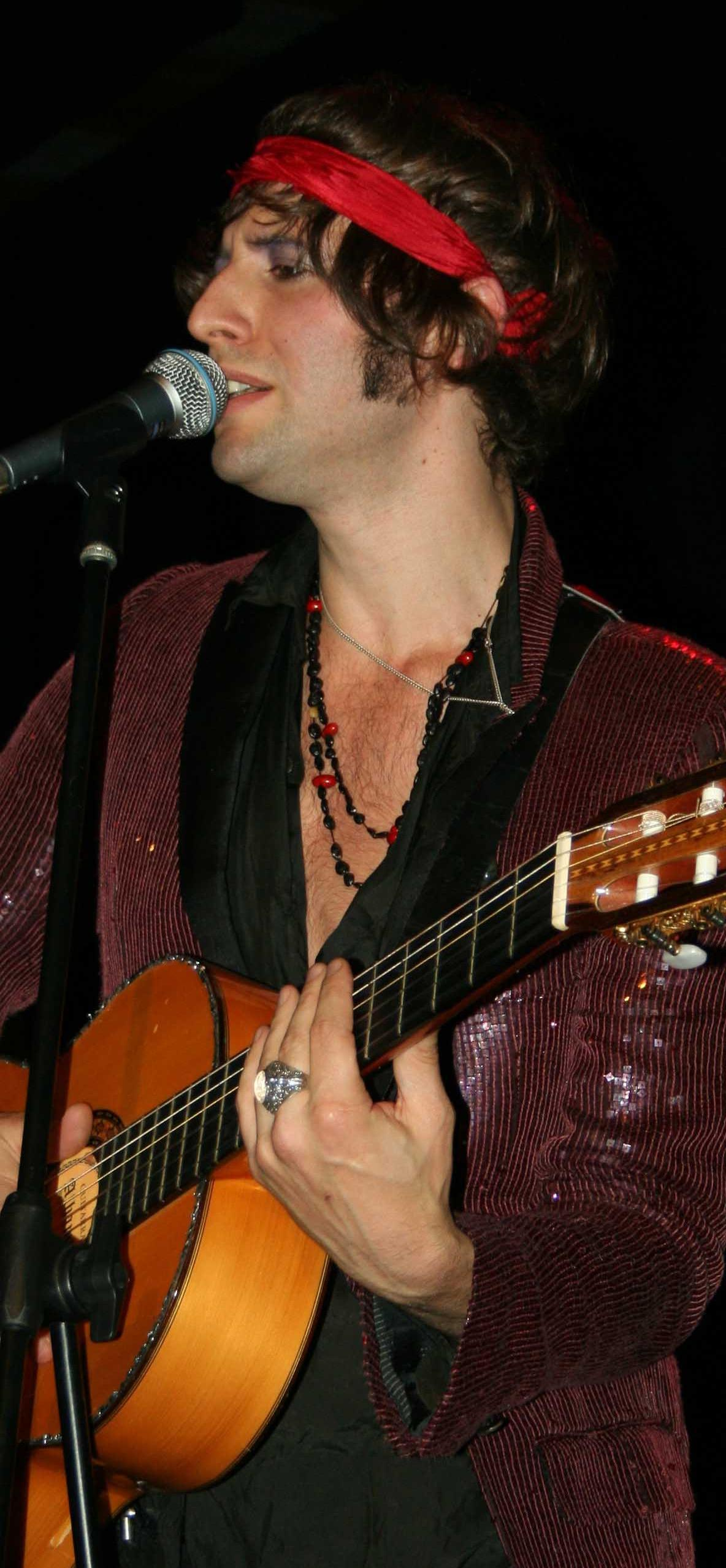
Adán Jodorowsky, Best Performance by a Younger Actor winner.

Best Science Fiction Film	Best Fantasy Film
**Total Recall**; The Abyss; Back to the Future Part II; Back to the Future Part III; Bill & Ted's Excellent Adventure; Flatliners; Honey, I Shrunk the Kids; RoboCop 2; Tremors	**Ghost**; The Adventures of Baron Munchausen; Always; Batman; Dick Tracy; Field of Dreams; Gremlins 2: The New Batch; Indiana Jones and the Last Crusade; Teenage Mutant Ninja Turtles
Best Horror Film	Best Performance by a Younger Actor
**Arachnophobia**; Bride of Re-Animator; Darkman; The Exorcist III; The Fly II; The Guardian; Nightbreed; Pet Sematary; Santa Sangre	**Adán Jodorowsky – Santa Sangre** as Young Fenix; Thomas Wilson Brown – Honey, I Shrunk the Kids as Russ Thompson, Jr.; Gabriel Damon – RoboCop 2 as Hob; Jasen Fisher – The Witches as Luke Eveshim; Charlie Korsmo – Dick Tracy as The Kid; Bryan Madorsky – Parents as Michael Laemle; Robert Oliveri – Honey, I Shrunk the Kids as Nick Szalinski; Jared Rushton – Honey, I Shrunk the Kids as Ron Thompson; Faviola Elenka Tapia – Santa Sangre as Young Alma
Best Actor	Best Actress
**Jeff Daniels – Arachnophobia** as Dr. Ross Jennings; Warren Beatty – Dick Tracy as Dick Tracy; Harrison Ford – Indiana Jones and the Last Crusade as Indiana Jones; Ed Harris – The Abyss as Virgil "Bud" Brigman; Axel Jodorowsky – Santa Sangre as Fenix; Liam Neeson – Darkman as Peyton Westlake / Darkman; Jack Nicholson – Batman as Jack Napier / The Joker; Arnold Schwarzenegger – Total Recall as Douglas Quaid / Hauser; Patrick Swayze – Ghost as Sam Wheat	**Demi Moore – Ghost** as Molly Jensen; Julie Carmen – Fright Night Part 2 as Regine Dandridge; Blanca Guerra – Santa Sangre as Concha; Anjelica Huston – The Witches as Miss Eva Ernst / Grand High Witch; Nicole Kidman – Dead Calm as Rae Ingram; Madonna – Dick Tracy as Breathless Mahoney; Mary Elizabeth Mastrantonio – The Abyss as Dr. Lindsey Brigman; Ally Sheedy – Fear as Cayce Bridges; Jenny Wright – I, Madman as Virginia
Best Supporting Actor	Best Supporting Actress
**Thomas F. Wilson – Back to the Future Part III** as Buford "Mad Dog" Tannen and Biff Tannen; Jeffrey Combs – Bride of Re-Animator as Dr. Herbert West; Brad Dourif – The Exorcist III as The Gemini Killer; Larry Drake – Darkman as Robert G. Durant; John Glover – Gremlins 2: The New Batch as Daniel Clamp; Tony Goldwyn – Ghost as Carl Bruner; John Goodman – Arachnophobia as Delbert McClintock; Al Pacino – Dick Tracy as Alphonse "Big Boy" Caprice; Robert Picardo – Gremlins 2: The New Batch as Forster	**Whoopi Goldberg – Ghost** as Oda Mae Brown; Kim Basinger – Batman as Vicki Vale; Finn Carter – Tremors as Rhonda LeBeck; Reba McEntire – Tremors as Heather Gummer; Julia Roberts – Flatliners as Rachel Mannus; Jenny Seagrove – The Guardian as Camilla; Mary Steenburgen – Back to the Future Part III as Clara Clayton; Rachel Ticotin – Total Recall as Melina; Mai Zetterling – The Witches as Helga Eveshim
Best Director	Best Writing
**James Cameron – The Abyss**; Clive Barker – Nightbreed; Joe Dante – Gremlins 2: The New Batch; Alejandro Jodorowsky – Santa Sangre; Frank Marshall – Arachnophobia; Sam Raimi – Darkman; Paul Verhoeven – Total Recall; Robert Zemeckis – Back to the Future Part III; Jerry Zucker – Ghost	**William Peter Blatty – The Exorcist III**; James Cameron – The Abyss; Jerry Belson – Always; Don Jakoby and Wesley Strick – Arachnophobia; Phil Alden Robinson – Field of Dreams; Bruce Joel Rubin – Ghost; Jeffrey Boam – Indiana Jones and the Last Crusade; Ronald Shusett, Dan O'Bannon, and Gary Goldman – Total Recall
Best Music	Best Costumes
**Alan Silvestri – Back to the Future Part III**; Alan Silvestri – The Abyss; Christopher Young – The Fly II; Maurice Jarre – Ghost; Jerry Goldsmith – Gremlins 2: The New Batch; Jack Hues – The Guardian; James Horner – Honey, I Shrunk the Kids; Simon Boswell – Santa Sangre; Jerry Goldsmith – Total Recall; Stanley Myers – The Witches	**Erica Edell Phillips – Total Recall**; Gabriella Pescucci – The Adventures of Baron Munchausen; Joanna Johnston – Back to the Future Part II; Joanna Johnston – Back to the Future Part III; Bob Ringwood – Batman; Jill M. Ohanneson – Bill & Ted's Excellent Adventure; Milena Canonero – Dick Tracy; Anthony Powell and Joanna Johnston – Indiana Jones and the Last Crusade; Alonzo Wilson, Lesja Liber, Xenia Beith, Fiona Cazaly, and Marian Keating – Teenage Mutant Ninja Turtles
Best Make-up	Best Special Effects
**John Caglione, Jr., Doug Drexler, and Cheri Minns – Dick Tracy**; Maggie Weston and Fabrizio Sforza – The Adventures of Baron Munchausen; Ken Chase, Michael Mills, and Kenny Myers – Back to the Future Part II; Paul Engelen, Lynda Armstrong, and Nick Dudman – Batman; Tony Gardner and Larry Hamlin – Darkman; Stephan Dupuis, Dennis Pawlik, Jo-Anne Smith-Ojeil, and Jayne Dancose – The Fly II; Bob Keen and Geoffrey Portass – Nightbreed; Rob Bottin, Jeff Dawn, Craig Berkeley, and Robin Weiss – Total Recall; John Stephenson (The Creature Shop) – The Witches	**Ken Ralston (Industrial Light & Magic) – Back to the Future Part II**; Industrial Light & Magic, Dream Quest Images, Fantasy II Film Effects, Wonderworks – The Abyss; Richard Conway and Kent Houston – The Adventures of Baron Munchausen; Bruce Nicholson, John T. Van Vliet, Richard Edlund, and Laura Buff – Ghost; Rick Baker, Ken Pepiot, and Dennis Michelson – Gremlins 2: The New Batch; Rick Fichter, David Sosalla, and Peter Chesney – Honey, I Shrunk the Kids; Phil Tippett, Rob Bottin, and Peter Kuran – RoboCop 2; Thomas L. Fisher, Eric Brevig, and Rob Bottin (Dream Quest Images, Industrial Light & Magic, Stetson Visual Services Inc.) – Total Recall; Tom Woodruff Jr. and Alec Gillis (4-Ward Productions, Illusion Arts Inc., Fantasy II Film Effects) – Tremors

=== Television ===
Best Genre Television Series	Best Genre Television Actor
**Star Trek: The Next Generation**	**Patrick Stewart** as Jean-Luc Picard – **Star Trek: The Next Generation**
Best Genre Television Actress	
**Linda Hamilton** as Catherine Chandler – **Beauty and the Beast**	

=== Special awards ===
==== The George Pal Memorial Award ====
- William Friedkin

==== Special Award ====
- Michael Biehn
- Watson Garman

==== The President's Award ====
- Batman
