= Saturn Award for Best Performance by a Younger Actor =

Film award for young actors

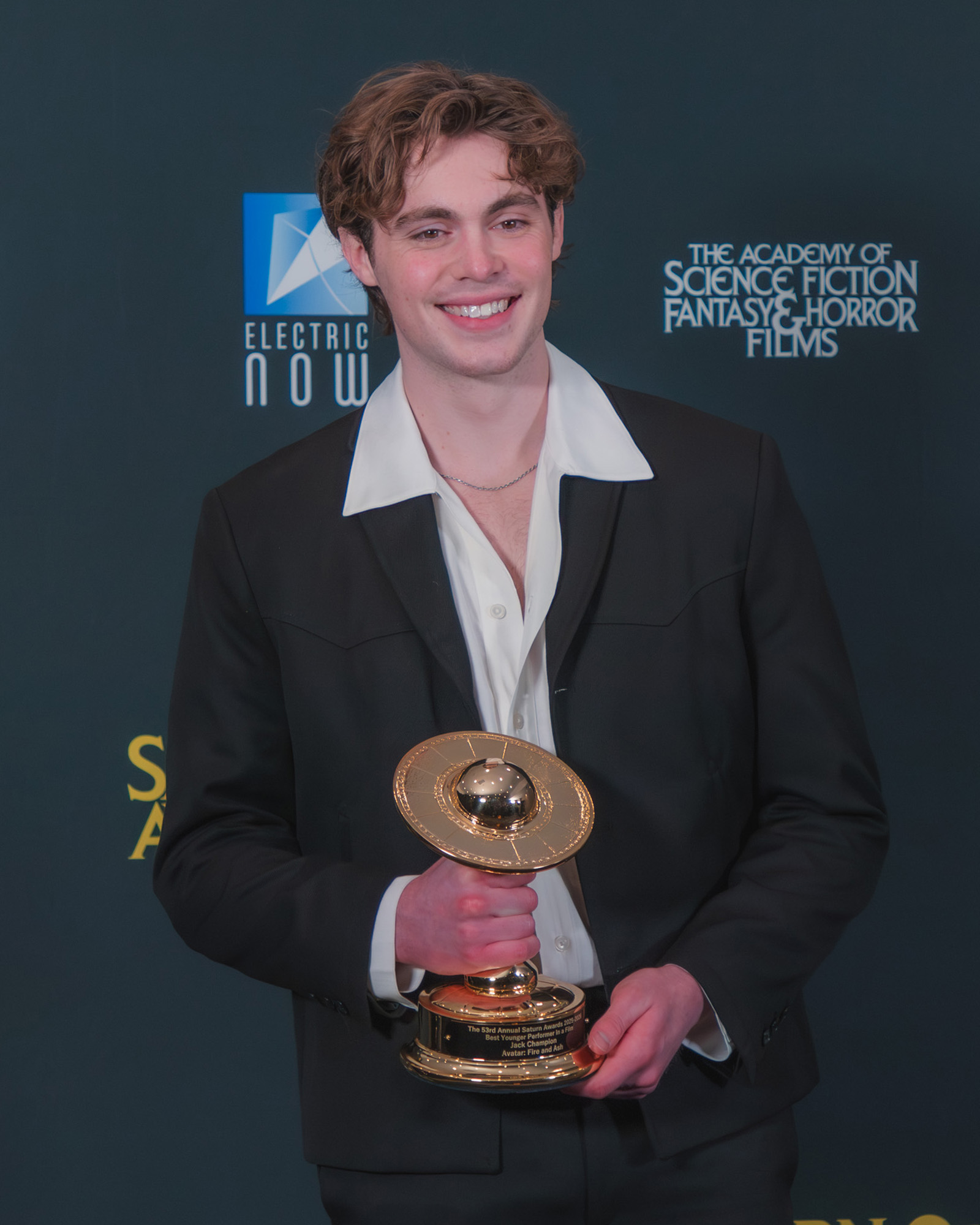
- The 2024/2025 recipient: Jack Champion
- Awarded for: Best performance of the year by a young actor (male or female) in a genre film
- Country: United States
- Presented by: Academy of Science Fiction, Fantasy and Horror Films
- First award: 1984
- Currently held by: Jack Champion for Avatar: Fire and Ash (2024/2025)
- Website: saturnawards.org

The Saturn Award for Best Performance by a Younger Actor is one of the annual awards given by the American professional organization the Academy of Science Fiction, Fantasy and Horror Films. The Saturn Awards are the oldest film-specialized awards to reward science fiction, fantasy, and horror achievements (the Hugo Award for Best Dramatic Presentation, awarded by the World Science Fiction Society who reward science fiction and fantasy in various media, is the oldest award for science fiction and fantasy films).

The category was first introduced for the 1984 film year, specifically to reward young actors and actresses in films, and was the first acting award of the Academy to reward both males and females. Tom Holland is the only actor to have won it three times, to have won it three years in a row, and to have won three times for the same role. Haley Joel Osment and Chloë Grace Moretz have each won the award twice. Moretz and Daniel Radcliffe have received the most nominations, with 5 each. Christina Ricci, Elijah Wood, Kirsten Dunst, and Tobey Maguire are the only actors to have won both Best Performance by a Younger Actor and later a Saturn Award for adults.

== Winners and nominees ==
=== 1980s ===
Year	Actor	Motion Picture	Character
1984 (12th)	Noah Hathaway	The NeverEnding Story	Atreyu
1984 (12th)	Drew Barrymore	Firestarter	Charlene "Charlie" McGee
1984 (12th)	Nick Corri	A Nightmare on Elm Street	Rod Lane
1984 (12th)	Corey Feldman	Gremlins	Pete Fountaine
1984 (12th)	Ke Huy Quan	Indiana Jones and the Temple of Doom	Short Round
1985 (13th)	Barret Oliver	D.A.R.Y.L.	Daryl
1985 (13th)	Fairuza Balk	Return to Oz	Dorothy Gale
1985 (13th)	Jeff Cohen	The Goonies	Lawrence "Chunk" Cohen
1985 (13th)	Ilan Mitchell-Smith	Weird Science	Wyatt O'Donnelly
1985 (13th)	Amelia Shankley	Dreamchild	Young Alice
1986 (14th)	Carrie Henn	Aliens	Rebecca "Newt" Jorden
1986 (14th)	Joey Cramer	Flight of the Navigator	David Freeman
1986 (14th)	Lucy Deakins	The Boy Who Could Fly	Amelia "Milly" Michaelson
1986 (14th)	Scott Grimes	Critters	Brad Brown
1986 (14th)	Jay Underwood	The Boy Who Could Fly	Eric Gibb
1987 (15th)	Kirk Cameron	Like Father Like Son	Chris Hammond / Dr. Jack Hammond
1987 (15th)	Scott Curtis	Cameron's Closet	Cameron Lansing
1987 (15th)	Stephen Dorff	The Gate	Glen
1987 (15th)	Andre Gower	The Monster Squad	Sean Crenshaw
1987 (15th)	Corey Haim	The Lost Boys	Sam Emerson
1987 (15th)	Joshua John Miller	Near Dark	Homer
1988 (16th)	Fred Savage	Vice Versa	Charlie Seymour / Marshall Seymour
1988 (16th)	Warwick Davis	Willow	Willow Ufgood
1988 (16th)	Rodney Eastman	Deadly Weapon	Zeke
1988 (16th)	Lukas Haas	Lady in White	Frankie Scarlatti
1988 (16th)	Corey Haim	Watchers	Travis Cornell
1988 (16th)	Jared Rushton	Big	Billy
1988 (16th)	Alex Vincent	Child's Play	Andy Barclay
1989/1990 (17th)	Adan Jodorowsky	Santa Sangre	Young Fenix
1989/1990 (17th)	Thomas Wilson Brown	Honey, I Shrunk the Kids	Russ Thompson, Jr.
1989/1990 (17th)	Gabriel Damon	RoboCop 2	Hob
1989/1990 (17th)	Jasen Fisher	The Witches	Luke Eveshim
1989/1990 (17th)	Charlie Korsmo	Dick Tracy	Kid
1989/1990 (17th)	Bryan Madorsky	Parents	Michael Laemle
1989/1990 (17th)	Robert Oliveri	Honey, I Shrunk the Kids	Nick Szalinski
1989/1990 (17th)	Jared Rushton	Honey, I Shrunk the Kids	Ron Thompson
1989/1990 (17th)	Faviola Elenka Tapia	Santa Sangre	Young Alma

=== 1990s ===
Year	Actor / Actress	Motion Picture	Character
1991 (18th)	Edward Furlong	Terminator 2: Judgment Day	John Connor
1991 (18th)	Jonathan Brandis	The NeverEnding Story II: The Next Chapter	Bastian Bux
1991 (18th)	Chris Demetral	Dolly Dearest	Jimmy Wade
1991 (18th)	Corey Haim	Prayer of the Rollerboys	Griffin
1991 (18th)	Candace Hutson	Dolly Dearest	Jessica Wade
1991 (18th)	Joshua John Miller	And You Thought Your Parents Were Weird	Josh Carson
1991 (18th)	Justin Whalin	Child's Play 3	Andy Barclay
1992 (19th)	Scott Weinger	Aladdin	Aladdin (voice)
1992 (19th)	Brandon Adams	The People Under the Stairs	Poindexter "Fool" Williams
1992 (19th)	Edward Furlong	Pet Sematary Two	Jeff Matthews
1992 (19th)	Robert Oliveri	Honey, I Blew Up the Kid	Nick Szalinski
1992 (19th)	Christina Ricci	The Addams Family	Wednesday Addams
1992 (19th)	Daniel Shalikar	Honey, I Blew Up the Kid	Adam Szalinski
1992 (19th)	Joshua Shalikar	Honey, I Blew Up the Kid	Adam Szalinski
1993 (20th)	Elijah Wood	The Good Son	Mark Evans
1993 (20th)	Jesse Cameron-Glickenhaus	Slaughter of the Innocents	Jesse Broderick
1993 (20th)	Manuel Colao	Flight of the Innocent	Vito
1993 (20th)	Joseph Mazzello	Jurassic Park	Tim Murphy
1993 (20th)	Austin O'Brien	Last Action Hero	Danny Madigan
1993 (20th)	Christina Ricci	Addams Family Values	Wednesday Addams
1993 (20th)	Ariana Richards	Jurassic Park	Lex Murphy
1994 (21st)	Kirsten Dunst	Interview with the Vampire	Claudia
1994 (21st)	Luke Edwards	Little Big League	Billy Heywood
1994 (21st)	Joseph Gordon-Levitt	Angels in the Outfield	Roger Bomman
1994 (21st)	Miko Hughes	Wes Craven's New Nightmare	Dylan Porter
1994 (21st)	Jonathan Taylor Thomas	The Lion King	Young Simba (voice)
1994 (21st)	Elijah Wood	North	North
1995 (22nd)	Christina Ricci	Casper	Kathleen "Kat" Harvey
1995 (22nd)	Kirsten Dunst	Jumanji	Judy Shepherd
1995 (22nd)	Bradley Pierce	Jumanji	Peter Shepherd
1995 (22nd)	Max Pomeranc	Fluke	Brian Johnson
1995 (22nd)	Hal Scardino	The Indian in the Cupboard	Omri
1995 (22nd)	Judith Vittet	The City of Lost Children	Miette
1996 (23rd)	Lucas Black	Sling Blade	Frank Wheatley
1996 (23rd)	Kevin Bishop	Muppet Treasure Island	Jim Hawkins
1996 (23rd)	James Duval	Independence Day	Miguel Casse
1996 (23rd)	Lukas Haas	Mars Attacks!	Richie Norris
1996 (23rd)	Jonathan Taylor Thomas	The Adventures of Pinocchio	Pinocchio (voice)
1996 (23rd)	Mara Wilson	Matilda	Matilda Wormwood
1997 (24th)	Jena Malone	Contact	Young Ellie
1997 (24th)	Vanessa Lee Chester	The Lost World: Jurassic Park	Kelly Curtis
1997 (24th)	Alexander Goodwin	Mimic	Chuy
1997 (24th)	Sam Huntington	Jungle 2 Jungle	Mimi-Siku
1997 (24th)	Dominique Swain	Face/Off	Jamie Archer
1997 (24th)	Mara Wilson	A Simple Wish	Anabel Greening
1998 (25th)	Tobey Maguire	Pleasantville	David / Bud
1998 (25th)	Josh Hartnett	The Faculty	Zeke Tyler
1998 (25th)	Katie Holmes	Disturbing Behavior	Rachel Wagner
1998 (25th)	Jack Johnson	Lost in Space	Will Robinson
1998 (25th)	Brad Renfro	Apt Pupil	Todd Bowden
1998 (25th)	Alicia Witt	Urban Legend	Natalie Simon
1999 (26th)	Haley Joel Osment	The Sixth Sense	Cole Sear
1999 (26th)	Emily Bergl	The Rage: Carrie 2	Rachel Lang
1999 (26th)	Jake Lloyd	Star Wars: Episode I – The Phantom Menace	Anakin Skywalker
1999 (26th)	Justin Long	Galaxy Quest	Brandon
1999 (26th)	Natalie Portman	Star Wars: Episode I – The Phantom Menace	Queen Padmé Amidala
1999 (26th)	Devon Sawa	Idle Hands	Anton Tobias

=== 2000s ===
Year	Actor / Actress	Motion Picture	Character
2000 (27th)	Devon Sawa	Final Destination	Alex Browning
2000 (27th)	Spencer Breslin	Disney's The Kid	Rusty Duritz
2000 (27th)	Holliston Coleman	Bless the Child	Cody O'Connor
2000 (27th)	Jonathan Lipnicki	The Little Vampire	Tony Thompson
2000 (27th)	Taylor Momsen	How the Grinch Stole Christmas	Cindy Lou Who
2000 (27th)	Anna Paquin	X-Men	Marie D'Ancanto / Rogue
2001 (28th)	Haley Joel Osment	A.I. Artificial Intelligence	David
2001 (28th)	Freddie Boath	The Mummy Returns	Alex O'Connell
2001 (28th)	Justin Long	Jeepers Creepers	Darry Jenner
2001 (28th)	Alakina Mann	The Others	Anne Stewart
2001 (28th)	Daniel Radcliffe	Harry Potter and the Philosopher's Stone	Harry Potter
2001 (28th)	Emma Watson	Harry Potter and the Philosopher's Stone	Hermione Granger
2002 (29th)	Tyler Hoechlin	Road to Perdition	Michael Sullivan Jr.
2002 (29th)	Alexis Bledel	Tuck Everlasting	Winnie Foster
2002 (29th)	Hayden Christensen	Star Wars: Episode II – Attack of the Clones	Anakin Skywalker
2002 (29th)	Daniel Radcliffe	Harry Potter and the Chamber of Secrets	Harry Potter
2002 (29th)	Jeremy Sumpter	Frailty	Young Adam
2002 (29th)	Elijah Wood	The Lord of the Rings: The Two Towers	Frodo Baggins
2003 (30th)	Jeremy Sumpter	Peter Pan	Peter Pan
2003 (30th)	Jenna Boyd	The Missing	Dot Gilkeson
2003 (30th)	Rachel Hurd-Wood	Peter Pan	Wendy Darling
2003 (30th)	Sosuke Ikematsu	The Last Samurai	Higen
2003 (30th)	Lindsay Lohan	Freaky Friday	Anna Coleman / Tess Coleman
2003 (30th)	Frankie Muniz	Agent Cody Banks	Cody Banks
2004 (31st)	Emmy Rossum	The Phantom of the Opera	Christine Daaé
2004 (31st)	Cameron Bright	Birth	Young Sean
2004 (31st)	Perla Haney-Jardine	Kill Bill: Volume 2	B.B
2004 (31st)	Freddie Highmore	Finding Neverland	Peter Llewelyn Davies
2004 (31st)	Jonathan Jackson	Riding the Bullet	Alan Parker
2004 (31st)	Daniel Radcliffe	Harry Potter and the Prisoner of Azkaban	Harry Potter
2005 (32nd)	Dakota Fanning	War of the Worlds	Rachel Ferrier
2005 (32nd)	Alex Etel	Millions	Damian Cunningham
2005 (32nd)	Freddie Highmore	Charlie and the Chocolate Factory	Charlie Bucket
2005 (32nd)	Josh Hutcherson	Zathura: A Space Adventure	Walter Budwing
2005 (32nd)	William Moseley	The Chronicles of Narnia: The Lion, the Witch and the Wardrobe	Peter Pevensie
2005 (32nd)	Daniel Radcliffe	Harry Potter and the Goblet of Fire	Harry Potter
2006 (33rd)	Ivana Baquero	Pan's Labyrinth	Ofelia / Princess Moanna
2006 (33rd)	Go Ah-sung	The Host	Park Hyun-seo
2006 (33rd)	Jodelle Ferland	Tideland	Jeliza-Rose
2006 (33rd)	Tristan Lake Leabu	Superman Returns	Jason White
2006 (33rd)	Mitchel Musso	Monster House	DJ Walters (voice)
2006 (33rd)	Ed Speleers	Eragon	Eragon
2007 (34th)	Freddie Highmore	August Rush	Evan Taylor / August Rush
2007 (34th)	Alex Etel	The Water Horse	Angus MacMorrow
2007 (34th)	Josh Hutcherson	Bridge to Terabithia	Jesse Aarons
2007 (34th)	Daniel Radcliffe	Harry Potter and the Order of the Phoenix	Harry Potter
2007 (34th)	Dakota Blue Richards	The Golden Compass	Lyra Belacqua
2007 (34th)	Rhiannon Leigh Wryn	The Last Mimzy	Emma Wilder
2008 (35th)	Jaden Smith	The Day the Earth Stood Still	Jacob Benson
2008 (35th)	Freddie Highmore	The Spiderwick Chronicles	Jared Grace / Simon Grace
2008 (35th)	Lina Leandersson	Let the Right One In	Eli
2008 (35th)	Dev Patel	Slumdog Millionaire	Jamal Malik
2008 (35th)	Catinca Untaru	The Fall	Alexandria
2008 (35th)	Brandon Walters	Australia	Nullah
2009 (36th)	Saoirse Ronan	The Lovely Bones	Susie Salmon
2009 (36th)	Taylor Lautner	The Twilight Saga: New Moon	Jacob Black
2009 (36th)	Bailee Madison	Brothers	Isabelle Cahill
2009 (36th)	Brooklynn Proulx	The Time Traveler's Wife	Young Clare Abshire (ages 6 and 8)
2009 (36th)	Max Records	Where the Wild Things Are	Max
2009 (36th)	Kodi Smit-McPhee	The Road	Boy

=== 2010s ===
Year	Actor / Actress	Motion Picture	Character
2010 (37th)	Chloë Grace Moretz	Let Me In	Abby
2010 (37th)	Logan Lerman	Percy Jackson & the Olympians: The Lightning Thief	Percy Jackson
2010 (37th)	Frankie and George McLaren	Hereafter	Marcus and Jason
2010 (37th)	Will Poulter	The Chronicles of Narnia: The Voyage of the Dawn Treader	Eustace Scrubb
2010 (37th)	Kodi Smit-McPhee	Let Me In	Owen
2010 (37th)	Hailee Steinfeld	True Grit	Mattie Ross
2010 (37th)	Charlie Tahan	Charlie St. Cloud	Sam St. Cloud
2011 (38th)	Joel Courtney	Super 8	Joe Lamb
2011 (38th)	Asa Butterfield	Hugo	Hugo Cabret
2011 (38th)	Elle Fanning	Super 8	Alice Dainard
2011 (38th)	Dakota Goyo	Real Steel	Max Kenton
2011 (38th)	Chloë Grace Moretz	Hugo	Isabelle
2011 (38th)	Saoirse Ronan	Hanna	Hanna Heller
2012 (39th)	Suraj Sharma	Life of Pi	Pi Patel
2012 (39th)	CJ Adams	The Odd Life of Timothy Green	Timothy Green
2012 (39th)	Tom Holland	The Impossible	Lucas Bennett
2012 (39th)	Daniel Huttlestone	Les Misérables	Gavroche
2012 (39th)	Chloë Grace Moretz	Dark Shadows	Carolyn Stoddard
2012 (39th)	Quvenzhané Wallis	Beasts of the Southern Wild	Hushpuppy
2013 (40th)	Chloë Grace Moretz	Carrie	Carrie White
2013 (40th)	Asa Butterfield	Ender's Game	Ender Wiggin
2013 (40th)	Sophie Nélisse	The Book Thief	Liesel Meminger
2013 (40th)	Saoirse Ronan	How I Live Now	Daisy
2013 (40th)	Ty Simpkins	Iron Man 3	Harley Keener
2013 (40th)	Dylan Sprayberry	Man of Steel	Clark Kent (13 Years)
2014 (41st)	Mackenzie Foy	Interstellar	Murph (10 Yrs.)
2014 (41st)	Elle Fanning	Maleficent	Aurora
2014 (41st)	Chloë Grace Moretz	The Equalizer	Teri
2014 (41st)	Tony Revolori	The Grand Budapest Hotel	Young Zero Moustafa
2014 (41st)	Kodi Smit-McPhee	Dawn of the Planet of the Apes	Alexander
2014 (41st)	Noah Wiseman	The Babadook	Samuel Vannick
2015 (42nd)	Ty Simpkins	Jurassic World	Gray Mitchell
2015 (42nd)	Olivia DeJonge	The Visit	Becca
2015 (42nd)	James Freedson-Jackson	Cop Car	Travis
2015 (42nd)	Milo Parker	Mr. Holmes	Roger
2015 (42nd)	Elias and Lukas Schwarz	Goodnight Mommy	Elias and Lukas
2015 (42nd)	Jacob Tremblay	Room	Jack Newsome
2016 (43rd)	Tom Holland	Captain America: Civil War	Peter Parker / Spider-Man
2016 (43rd)	Ruby Barnhill	The BFG	Sophie
2016 (43rd)	Julian Dennison	Hunt for the Wilderpeople	Ricky
2016 (43rd)	Lewis MacDougall	A Monster Calls	Conor
2016 (43rd)	Neel Sethi	The Jungle Book	Mowgli
2016 (43rd)	Anya Taylor-Joy	The Witch	Thomasin
2017 (44th)	Tom Holland	Spider-Man: Homecoming	Peter Parker / Spider-Man
2017 (44th)	Dafne Keen	Logan	Laura Kinney / X-23
2017 (44th)	Sophia Lillis	It	Beverly Marsh
2017 (44th)	Millicent Simmonds	Wonderstruck	Rose
2017 (44th)	Jacob Tremblay	Wonder	August "Auggie" Pullman
2017 (44th)	Letitia Wright	Black Panther	Shuri
2017 (44th)	Zendaya	Spider-Man: Homecoming	Michelle
2018/2019 (45th)	Tom Holland	Spider-Man: Far From Home	Peter Parker / Spider-Man
2018/2019 (45th)	Evan Alex	Us	Jason Wilson and Pluto
2018/2019 (45th)	Asher Angel	Shazam!	Billy Batson
2018/2019 (45th)	Millie Bobby Brown	Godzilla: King of the Monsters	Madison Russell
2018/2019 (45th)	Jack Dylan Grazer	Shazam!	Freddy Freeman
2018/2019 (45th)	Shahadi Wright Joseph	Us	Zora Wilson and Umbrae
2018/2019 (45th)	Millicent Simmonds	A Quiet Place	Regan Abbott
2019/2020 (46th)
2019/2020 (46th)	Kyliegh Curran	Doctor Sleep	Abra Stone
2019/2020 (46th)	Ella Jay Basco	Birds of Prey	Cassandra Cain
2019/2020 (46th)	Julia Butters	Once Upon a Time in Hollywood	Trudi Frazer
2019/2020 (46th)	Roman Griffin Davis	Jojo Rabbit	Jojo Bectzler
2019/2020 (46th)	Lexy Kolker	Freaks	Chloe Lewis
2019/2020 (46th)	JD McCrary	The Lion King	Young Simba (voice)

=== 2020s ===
Year	Actor / Actress	Motion Picture	Character
2021/2022 (50th)	Finn Wolfhard	Ghostbusters: Afterlife	Trevor Spengler
2021/2022 (50th)	Noah Jupe	A Quiet Place Part II	Marcus Abbott
2021/2022 (50th)	Madeleine McGraw	The Black Phone	Gwendolyn "Gwen" Blake
2021/2022 (50th)	Millicent Simmonds	A Quiet Place Part II	Regan Abbott
2021/2022 (50th)	Mason Thames	The Black Phone	Finney Blake
2021/2022 (50th)	Jacob Tremblay	Luca	Luca (voice)
2022/2023 (51st)	Xolo Maridueña	Blue Beetle	Jaime Reyes / Blue Beetle
2022/2023 (51st)	Halle Bailey	The Little Mermaid	Ariel
2022/2023 (51st)	Jack Champion	Avatar: The Way of Water	Miles "Spider" Socorro
2022/2023 (51st)	Violet McGraw	M3GAN	Cady
2022/2023 (51st)	Vivien Lyra Blair	The Boogeyman	Sawyer Harper
2022/2023 (51st)	Noah Schnapp	The Tutor	Jackson
2023/2024 (52nd)	Jenna Ortega	Beetlejuice Beetlejuice	Astrid Deetz
2023/2024 (52nd)	Freya Allan	Kingdom of the Planet of the Apes	Mae
2023/2024 (52nd)	Mckenna Grace	Ghostbusters: Frozen Empire	Phoebe Spengler
2023/2024 (52nd)	Kaylee Hottle	Godzilla x Kong: The New Empire	Jia
2023/2024 (52nd)	Calah Lane	Wonka	Noodle
2023/2024 (52nd)	Alisha Weir	Abigail	Abigail Lazaar
2023/2024 (52nd)	Rachel Zegler	The Hunger Games: The Ballad of Songbirds and Snakes	Lucy Gray Baird
2024/2025 (53rd)	Jack Champion	Avatar: Fire and Ash	Miles "Spider" Socorro
2024/2025 (53rd)	Miles Caton	Sinners	Samuel "Sammie" Moore
2024/2025 (53rd)	Maia Kealoha	Lilo & Stitch	Lilo
2024/2025 (53rd)	Madeleine McGraw	Black Phone 2	Gwen
2024/2025 (53rd)	Sophie Sloan	Dust Bunny	Aurora
2024/2025 (53rd)	Mason Thames	How to Train Your Dragon	Hiccup Horrendous Haddock III

== Multiple nominations ==
5 nominations

- Chloe Grace Moretz
- Daniel Radcliffe

4 nominations

- Freddie Highmore
- Tom Holland

3 nominations

- Corey Haim
- Christina Ricci
- Saoirse Ronan
- Millicent Simmonds
- Kodi Smit-McPhee
- Jacob Tremblay
- Elijah Wood

2 nominations

- Asa Butterfield
- Jack Champion
- Kirsten Dunst
- Alex Etel
- Elle Fanning
- Edward Furlong
- Lukas Haas
- Josh Hutcherson
- Justin Long
- Madeleine McGraw
- Joshua John Miller
- Robert Oliveri
- Haley Joel Osment
- Jared Rushton
- Devon Sawa
- Ty Simpkins
- Jeremy Sumpter
- Mason Thames
- Jonathan Taylor Thomas
- Mara Wilson

== Multiple wins ==
3 wins

- Tom Holland

2 wins

- Chloe Grace Moretz
- Haley Joel Osment

== See also ==
- Saturn Award for Best Performance by a Younger Actor in a Television Series
