= Christopher Hawthorne =

American screenwriter and producer

- Born: United States
- Occupations: Screenwriter, producer

Christopher Hawthorne is an American screenwriter and producer.

Hawthorne is best known for writing the screenplay for director Bob Balaban's surrealist horror-comedy Parents, starring Randy Quaid, Mary Beth Hurt, Bryan Madorsky and Sandy Dennis.

Hawthorne is also known for writing the made for cable television films The Courtyard, a thriller starring Andrew McCarthy, Mädchen Amick and Cheech Marin, the family film Whiskers with Michael Caloz and the mermaid themed Sea People starring Shawn Roberts and Hume Cronyn, which won the Writers Guild of America Award for Best Children's Script.
