= Parents (1988 film) =

1989 film by Bob Balaban

- Theatrical release poster
- Directed by: Bob Balaban
- Written by: Christopher Hawthorne
- Produced by: Bonnie Palef
- Starring: Randy Quaid; Mary Beth Hurt; Sandy Dennis
- Cinematography: Ernest Day; Robin Vidgeon
- Edited by: Bill Pankow
- Music by: Jonathan Elias; Angelo Badalamenti
- Production company: Great American Films
- Distributed by: Vestron Pictures
- Release date: December 9, 1988 (Buffalo, New York)
- Running time: 82 minutes
- Country: United States
- Language: English
- Budget: $3 million
- Box office: $870,532

Parents is a 1988 American horror film directed by Bob Balaban in his directorial debut, and starring Randy Quaid, Mary Beth Hurt, Sandy Dennis, and Bryan Madorsky. A satire on mid-century American suburban life and dysfunctional families, the film centers on a 10-year old boy in 1950s California who suspects that his parents are secretly cannibalistic serial killers.

Released by Vestron Pictures in December 1988, the film received a mixed response from critics and fared poorly commercially. Randy Quaid's performance earned him an Independent Spirit Award nomination for Best Male Lead, while Quaid and Madorsky shared Fantafestival Award for Best Actor honors at Fantafestival. Madorsky was also nominated for a Saturn Award.

== Plot ==
In 1958, the Laemle family—father Nick, mother Lily, and their 10-year-old son Michael—move from Massachusetts to a Californian suburban neighborhood. As young boy Michael is very socially awkward and also has an overly-active imagination, he has trouble making friends at school. He is also prone to strange and disturbing dreams, such as dreaming that he has jumped into bed, only for it to collapse into a pool of blood.

Emotionally distraught from the move and the dreams, Michael is traumatized after accidentally stumbling upon his parents having sex in the living room, which he envisions as a blood-soaked affair in which they appear to be biting one another. He is further disturbed after watching his father cutting into a corpse in the Division of Human Testing at Toxico, where Nick is developing an Agent Orange–style chemical defoliant for use in jungles. Michael finds some consolation in Sheila, a classmate whose own parents, acquaintances of Nick and Lily, are concealing a dysfunctional marriage.

As time progresses, Michael begins to suspect that his parents are cannibals, after he seemingly discovers dismembered body parts hanging on a meat hook in the basement. Michael is convinced that what he has seen is true, much to the chagrin of his school guidance counselor, Millie Dew, who assumes Michael's claim to be a fantasy.

One afternoon, Millie goes home with Michael in order to convince him that he is imagining everything, only for the two of them to find a corpse in the basement. Michael flees to his bedroom while Millie is forced into a pantry and attacked by an unseen assailant with a butcher knife, before being bludgeoned with a golf club. When Nick and Lily arrive home, Michael attacks his father. Later that evening, Nick tries to feed Michael human meat from Millie's corpse, assuring him that he will develop a taste for it like his mother did. Lily smiles in agreement, but Michael fights back and manages to stab his father in the shoulder. In a rage, Nick tries to kill Michael, but Lily intervenes and stabs Nick in the chest before he turns the knife on her, fatally wounding her.

Michael is chased through the house by his injured father, who accidentally runs into a gas line due to his injuries. Cornering Michael in the basement, Nick breaks the gas line and then runs into a shelf of wine bottles, which he pulls down onto himself, presumably pinning him. As gas fills the room, Michael has barely enough time to escape before the gas ignites and blows up the house.

Some time later, Michael has been placed under the care of his paternal grandparents. After putting him to bed, Michael's grandparents leave him a midnight snack of a suspicious-looking meat sandwich, implying that his father's cannibalism was a learned behavior.

== Cast ==
- Bryan Madorsky as Michael Laemle
- Randy Quaid as Nick Laemle
- Mary Beth Hurt as Lily Laemle
- Sandy Dennis as Millie Dew
- Juno Mills-Cockell as Sheila Zellner
- Kathryn Grody as Miss Baxter
- Deborah Rush as Gladys Zellner
- Graham Jarvis as Marty Zellner
- Helen Carscallen as Grandmother
- Warren Van Evera as Grandfather
- Wayne Robson as Lab Attendant

== Production ==
=== Development ===
Screenwriter Christopher Hawthorne was inspired to write an unconventional horror film centered on a family: "What I asked myself was, 'What are horror movies really about?' They are about, as what my experience was [as a child]—you're alone, you're in your bed—what's out there in the dark? And the answer to that is, it's mom and dad out there in the dark." Hawthorne felt that the film was "not a movie about a cannibalism," but rather a film "about alcoholism and abuse."

Hawthorne initially became connected with producer Ray Stark through his friendship with producer Mary Ann Page. Stark expressed interest in producing Parents after reading Hawthorne's screenplay, but Vestron Pictures, who had acquired the screenplay, refused to pay Stark his requested fee. The film was ultimately produced by Bonnie Palef.

Hawthorne originally considered Todd Solondz as a director for the film, but this never reached fruition as he felt that the two had creative differences at the time. Bob Balaban, an actor and first-time director, was impressed by Hawthorne's screenplay and approached Vestron to direct, after which he was hired.

=== Casting ===
Christopher Walken was originally considered for the role of Nick Laemle before Randy Quaid was cast in the part. Balaban, who was a personal friend of Mary Beth Hurt, cast her in the role of Lily Laemle. Bryan Madorsky was cast as Michael, the young son of Nick and Lily.

=== Filming ===
Parents was filmed in Toronto, Ontario, Canada. Exteriors were shot in Toronto on location, while the interiors of the Laemles' mid-century modern home were filmed on original sets. Balaban partly furnished the interiors with his own period furniture.

The film's original cinematographer, Ernest Day, was replaced by Robin Vidgeon shortly after production began due to Day's wife falling ill. At the time, Vidgeon had recently completed shooting on Mr. North (1988) and Hellraiser (1987).

During filming, Balaban refused to have young Madorsky to read the film's screenplay or learn lines in advance, instead opting to "walk him through the scenes and gently tell him what to say." Randy Quaid met his future wife, Evi Motolanez, during production, as she worked as a personal driver for him.

== Release ==
Parents was released theatrically in Buffalo, New York on December 9, 1988. It premiered the following month in New York City and Los Angeles on January 27, 1989.

=== Home media ===
Parents was released on DVD on May 25, 1999 by Artisan Entertainment in unmatted full-screen format. The original DVD was out of print for a brief period of time, before the film was re-released in the DVD format as a double feature with the film Fear, and presented for the first time in widescreen since its original theatrical release.

Lionsgate released the film on Blu-ray on January 31, 2017, as part of their Vestron Video Collector's Series line.

== Reception ==
=== Box office ===
Parents grossed $870,532 in the US on a budget of $3 million.

=== Critical response ===
On the review aggregator website Rotten Tomatoes, 63% of 16 critics' reviews are positive. Metacritic, which uses a weighted average, assigned the film a score of 66 out of 100, based on 5 critics, indicating "generally favorable" reviews.

Roger Ebert of the Chicago Sun-Times rated it two out of four stars, writing that the film's tone never satisfyingly settles on satire, comedy, or horror. Variety wrote "There is not enough weight or complexity to the material to justify the serious approach, and while the potential for considerable black comedy exists, Balaban only scratches the surface. The laughs never come." Gene Siskel surprised Ebert on their TV show when he said that he actually enjoyed the film and found its weirdness and style entertaining. Caryn James of The New York Times wrote: "The satire of the 50s is more bland than biting, dependent on authentically garish costumes and sets. And when the horror-film scenes begin to intrude on normal life (what is hanging from the cellar ceiling, anyway?) Mr. Balaban can't make the dark elements seem comic enough to mesh with the rest of this nightmarish joke." Michael Wilmington of the Los Angeles Times praised the lead performances of Quaid and Hurt, but criticized its screenplay, writing that it "makes sense only on its own symbolic level; strip away the symbols and the story becomes scatterbrained."

Dorothy Keenan of The Buffalo News praised the film as "among the strangest, most peculiar but nevertheless amusing horror films to come along in some time." Writing for The Washington Post, both Hal Hinson and Desson Howe called it a flawed but impressive debut. Kim Newman of Empire gave the film a favorable assessment, deeming it an "unfairly neglected, perfectly creepy and disturbing suburban bizarro drama."

=== Accolades ===
Award/association	Year	Category	Recipient(s) and nominee(s)	Result	Ref.
Avoriaz Fantastic Film Festival	1989	Best Film – Critics Award	Parents	Won	
Avoriaz Fantastic Film Festival	1989	Grand Prize	Parents	Nominated	
Fantafestival	1989	Best Actor	Bryan Madorsky	Won	
Fantafestival	1989	Best Actor	Randy Quaid	Won	
Independent Spirit Awards	1990	Best Male Lead	Randy Quaid	Nominated	
Saturn Awards	1991	Best Performance by a Younger Actor	Bryan Madorsky	Nominated	

== Legacy ==
The film has developed a cult following.

Tyler Eschberger of Bloody Disgusting wrote in a 2022 retrospective: "The tone of 1989’s Parents is one of claustrophobia and nightmarish paranoia. An unease and dread permeate the film. Balaban employs the “is it all in their head?” trope for the majority of the film’s runtime. We aren’t sure if Michael’s suspicions are real or if he’s a troubled boy with an overactive imagination. This aspect of the narrative lends Parents an undercurrent of sadness and tragedy you might not expect at first glance."

== Sources ==
- Balaban, Bob; Palef, Bonnie (2017). Parents (Audio commentary). Vestron Pictures. OCLC 1015886312.
