= Judith Dolan =

American costume designer (born 1944)

Judith Anne Dolan (born June 25, 1944, Sparrows Point Baltimore, Maryland) is an Tony Award winning American costume designer. She currently teaches on the faculty of the University of California, San Diego where she is a professor of design and directing in the Department of Theatre and Dance. She has designed costumes for several original Broadway productions, including Stephen Sondheim's Merrily We Roll Along, Andrew Lloyd Webber's Joseph and the Amazing Technicolor Dreamcoat (1982), Jason Robert Brown's Parade (1998), and Alfred Uhry's LoveMusik (2007).

== Biography ==
Born and raised in Baltimore Maryland, Dolan has an MFA in Costume Design and a PhD in directing, design/theater, and aesthetic theory from Stanford University. She made her Broadway debut designing costumes for the original production of Stephen Sondheim's Merrily We Roll Along in 1981. She won the 1995 Lucille Lortelle Award for Outstanding Costume Design for the Off-Broadway production of Michael John LaChiusa's The Petrified Prince and the 1997 Tony Award for Best Costume Design for her work on Leonard Bernstein's Candide; both of which were directed by Hal Prince. Her other Broadway design credits include the original Broadway production of Andrew Lloyd Webber's Joseph and the Amazing Technicolor Dreamcoat (1982), Jason Robert Brown's Parade (1998), Carrie Hamilton and Carol Burnett's Hollywood Arms (2002), and Alfred Uhry's LoveMusik (2007). For the latter work she was nominated for the Drama Desk Award for Outstanding Costume Design.

Dolan has also designed costumes for Mozart's The Magic Flute with The Cleveland Orchestra and Christoph von Dohnányi, Rossini's The Barber of Seville for the New York City Opera, Mozart's Idomeneo for the Wolf Trap Opera, the Los Angeles Philharmonic's Night and Dreams: A Schubert and Beckett Recital directed by Yuval Sharon, and multiple productions with the Houston Grand Opera, the Brooklyn Academy of Music, The Old Vic, the Abbey Theatre, and the Alley Theatre. Her television and film work includes costumes for The Rosary Murders (1987), The Courtyard (1995) and The 36th Annual Tony Awards (1982).

In 2014 Dolan was awarded the Ruth Morley Design Award by the League of Professional Theatre Women in NYC. Her work was a featured exhibition at the La Jolla Historical Society in 2017-2018.
