= The Courtyard =

1995 made-for-television thriller film

The Courtyard is a 1995 made-for-television thriller film that premiered on the Showtime network. Directed by Fred Walton, the movies uses a screenplay by Wendy Biller and Christopher Hawthorne. The work centers around a yuppie architect who suspects his neighbor is a murderer. The film stars Andrew McCarthy as Jonathan, Mädchen Amick as Lauren, Cheech Marin as Angel Steiner, David Packer as Jack Morgan, Bonnie Bartlett as Cathleen Fitzgerald, and Vincent Schiavelli as Ivan. Judith Dolan designed costumes for the production.
