= Thelma Tixou =

Mexican vedette and actress of Argentine origin

- Born: Thelma Delia Suklenik Snopik; May 4, 1944; Buenos Aires, Argentina
- Died: 15 January 2019 (aged 75); Mexico City, Mexico
- Other name: La Muchacha del Cuerpo de Oro (The Girl with The Golden Body)
- Occupations: Vedette; actress; dancer
- Years active: 1965—2019

Thelma Delia Suklenik Snopik, better known by her stage name Thelma Tixou (May 4, 1944 – January 15, 2019), was a Mexican vedette and actress of Argentine origin. She was one of the most popular Mexican vedettes during the 1970s and 1980s, and she became famous worldwide for her role as The Tattooed Woman in Alejandro Jodorowsky's cult classic film Santa Sangre (1989).

== Biography ==
=== Early years ===
Of Lithuanian origin on her mother's side, Tixou studied for six years in the Teatro Labardén, in Buenos Aires, Argentina. She was a very good jazz dancer. At age 13 she started her career as vedette. Eventually, Tixou is presented in a contest at the Teatro Nacional Cervantes of Buenos Aires, and was chosen among 10 dancers to fill the role of vedette.

=== Career ===
She was star of such Argentine Revues as Radiolandia, Antena and Ellas. She also had the opportunity to share the stage with the renowned actress and singer Tita Merello. She was a "First Vedette" of the Maipo Theater, the Teatro Nacional and the Teatro Astral, where she alternated with other vedettes including Zulma Faiad and Nélida Roca. Tixou made her television debut in 1965 in the popular TV show La matraca. In 1967, she appeared on film as star of the comedy La Muchacha del cuerpo de oro ("The Girl With the Golden Body"), which turned into a nickname by which she became known through her glory years in Argentina.

Tixou arrived in Mexico after being hired by artistic agent Angel Shuger for only 45 days, since she had also received an offer to work at the famous cabaret Le Lido in Paris. She debuted with great success in the famous Teatro Blanquita of Mexico City. Thelma Tixou was the main star of famous Mexican cabarets such as El Capri or El Clóset for several years, and she decided to settle in Mexico. During her most successful years, Tixou managed to earn $15,000 a month.

Along with her work in nightclubs and cabarets, Tixou also participated in a large number of plays and theater performances with actors and comedians such as Chabelo, Gustavo Rojo, Alberto "El Caballo" Rojas, Lalo "el Mimo", Jaime Fernández and others. On television she was also part of the cast of the famous program Siempre en Domingo, with Raúl Velasco.

In 1984, Tixou starred in the movie La superdotada with the singer King Clave. In 1989, Tixou achieved international fame thanks to her participation in the cult film Santa Sangre, by artist and filmmaker Alejandro Jodorowsky.

In 2001, the actress debuted in the Mexican telenovelas in the melodrama Salomé. Since then, Tixou has appeared in several Mexican TV series.

== Personal life ==
Thelma Tixou married her manager and agent, an ex-boxer with whom she suffered various physical and verbal abuses. Her husband later abandoned her, leaving her in economic ruin. Eventually, after her ordeal was over, Tixou subsequently endured and emerged from a severe depression.

Tixou lived her last years in Mexico City, where she died of a brain tumor on 15 January 2019, at the age of 75.

She is buried at the Panteón Israelita in Mexico City.https://es.findagrave.com/memorial/214344770/thelma-tixou

== Filmography ==
=== Films ===
- La muchacha del cuerpo de oro (1967)
- La superdotada (1984)
- Santa Sangre (1989)
- Cándido Pérez, especialista en señoras (1991)

=== Television ===
- La matraca (1965)
- Variedades de medianoche (1977)
- Siempre en Domingo (1977)
- Hasta que la muerte los separe (1994)
- Salomé (2001)
- Las Vías del Amor (2002)
- Pablo y Andrea (2005)
- Central de Abasto (2009)
- Porque el amor manda (2012)
