= La Muchacha del cuerpo de oro =

- Directed by: Dino Minitti
- Produced by: Beatriz Galvano, Julio Godoy
- Cinematography: Vicente Cosentino
- Release date: 1967
- Running time: 85 minute
- Country: Argentina
- Language: Spanish

La Muchacha del cuerpo de oro is a 1967 Argentine film.

== Cast ==
- Thelma Tixou
- Enzo Viena
- Fernando Siro
- Héctor Pellegrini
- Alba Múgica
- Nina Pontier (birth name: Nina Pontoriero)
