= Santa Sangre =

1989 film

- American theatrical release poster
- Directed by: Alejandro Jodorowsky
- Screenplay by: Alejandro Jodorowsky; Roberto Leoni; Claudio Argento
- Story by: Alejandro Jodorowsky
- Adaptation by: Robert Leoni
- Produced by: Claudio Argento
- Starring: Axel Jodorowsky; Blanca Guerra; Adán Jodorowsky; Guy Stockwell; Thelma Tixou
- Cinematography: Daniele Nannuzzi
- Edited by: Mauro Bonanni
- Music by: Simon Boswell
- Distributed by: Mainline Pictures; Expanded Entertainment
- Release dates: 19 May 1989 (Cannes); 24 November 1989 (Italy); 31 May 1990 (Mexico)
- Running time: 123 minutes
- Countries: Mexico; Italy
- Languages: English; Spanish
- Budget: $787,000

Santa Sangre (Spanish pronunciation: [ˈsãn̪.t̪a ˈsãŋ.ɡɾe], 'Holy Blood') is a 1989 surrealist psychological horror film directed by Alejandro Jodorowsky and written by Jodorowsky along with Claudio Argento and Roberto Leoni. It stars Axel Jodorowsky, Adán Jodorowsky, Teo Jodorowsky, Blanca Guerra, Thelma Tixou, and Guy Stockwell. An international co-production of Mexico and Italy, the film is set in Mexico, and tells the story of Fénix, a boy who grew up in a circus and his struggle with childhood trauma. It is included in Empire magazine's 2008 list of the 500 Greatest Movies of All Time.

== Plot ==
Fénix is a child magician in a Mexican circus, Circo del Gringo, run by his father Orgo, a knife-thrower, and his mother Concha, an aerialist. The circus includes a tattooed lady who performs with Orgo, her adopted deaf-mute mime and tightrope walker daughter Alma with whom Fénix is infatuated, Fénix's dwarf friend Aladin, a troupe of clowns, and an elephant. Concha also leads a Folk Catholic cult whose patron saint is a girl who was raped and had her arms cut off. (Note: The cult is inspired by the Catholic saint Maria Goretti (1890–1902), who was the victim of an attempted rape and then murdered at age 11; her attacker, Alessandro Serenelli, later repented and became a Capuchin friar.) Their church is about to be razed at the behest of the landowner, but the followers make a last stand against the police and bulldozers. A Monsignor arrives to resolve the conflict, but after he denounces the temple as sacrilegious and leaves in disgust, the demolition proceeds. Fénix leads Concha back to the circus, where she discovers Orgo having an affair with the tattooed lady. Concha is furious, but Orgo calms her through hypnosis before raping her.

The circus elephant dies and is paraded through the city inside a giant casket, which is dropped into the city dump. Hundreds of scavengers open it, tear apart the elephant's carcass, and take away its meat. Orgo chides Fénix for mourning the elephant and uses a knife to give Fénix a chest tattoo of a phoenix identical to his own, which he claims makes Fénix a man.

During Concha's aerial act, she sees Orgo giving the tattooed lady a pearl necklace. She chases after them, finds them about to have sex, and pours sulphuric acid on Orgo's genitals. Orgo retaliates by cutting off her arms, then walks into the street and slits his own throat. Fénix witnesses all this from the trailer that Concha locked him inside. Afterwards, he sees the tattooed lady drive off with Alma.

Years later, an adult Fénix has been committed to a psychiatric hospital. He is taken to a movie theater along with patients who have Down syndrome. A pimp intercepts them, gives them cocaine, and introduces them to an obese prostitute. Fénix spots the tattooed lady, now a prostitute, and is enraged. Back at the asylum, Concha calls out to Fénix from the street and he escapes by climbing down a rope from his cell window. The tattooed lady tries to pimp Alma, who flees. An unseen assailant stabs the tattooed lady to death, and Alma later finds her body.

Fénix and Concha go on to perform a stage act, "Concha and Her Magic Hands," in which he stands behind her and moves his arms so they appear to be hers. Offstage, she orders Fénix, a knife thrower like his father, to kill all the women he is interested in, including a burlesque performer and an androgynous wrestler. When Fénix expresses trepidation and regret at killing the women, Concha manipulatively asserts that he is nothing without her and that no one cares about him. He frequently hallucinates and dreams about the women he has killed.

Alma finds Fénix, and they plan to escape from Concha, who tries to force Fénix to murder Alma as well. After a struggle, he stabs Concha in the abdomen. She vanishes after taunting Fénix, saying she will always be inside of him. Flashbacks reveal that Concha bled to death after Orgo severed her arms; Fénix has since kept a life-sized mannequin of her that he uses on stage and at home. He destroys his homemade temple and throws away the mannequin with the help of Aladin and the circus clowns, who disappear once the mannequin is discarded, revealing them to also be mere manifestations of Fénix's subconscious.

Alma removes Fénix's red artificial nails, which he wore while doing "Concha's" bidding, and leads him outside, where police order them to put up their hands. As they both comply, Fénix regards his own hands with awe, relieved that he has finally regained control of them.

== Cast ==
- Axel Jodorowsky as Fénix
  - Adán Jodorowsky as young Fénix
- Blanca Guerra as Concha
- Guy Stockwell as Orgo
- Thelma Tixou as Tattooed Woman
- Sabrina Dennison as Alma
  - Faviola Elenka Tapia as young Alma
- Teo Jodorowsky as Pimp
- Ma. De Jesus Aranzabal as Fat Prostitute (Lores)
- Jesús Juárez as Aladin
- Sergio Bustamante as Monsignor
- Gloria Contreras as Rubí
- S. Rodriguez as Santa
- Zonia Rangel Mora as Trini
- Borolas as Box-office attendant

== Production ==
=== Development ===
Roberto Leoni, who had worked in the library of a psychiatric hospital where he had been in contact with people suffering from mental disorders, developed a story about dissociative identity disorder that he told Claudio Argento during a time they worked together. Argento appreciated the story and added to it, and with Leoni, they decided to present it to the director who seemed to them the most suited to the material, Alejandro Jodorowsky. After his cult film The Holy Mountain (1973), Jodorowsky was asked to direct a film version of Frank Herbert’s epic 1965 science fiction novel Dune but the project had collapsed, and except for the children’s fable Tusk in 1980 he had stopped directing films, working as a comics writer in France.

Jodorowsky developed this story, also telling Leoni the story of Gregorio Cárdenas Hernández, which were in some respects similar, and together they wrote the script of Santa Sangre.

=== Writing ===
'One of these patients, who worked with me because he knew 3 or 4 languages so he could help me sort the books, because the library had 50,000 volumes of all types and ages, one day started looking sideways and saying: "...shut up... shut up..." The third time I asked him what happened and he answered me calmly with his calm blue eyes: "No, nothing, I have a voice that tells me to kill you, but don't worry because I love you." I was a little uncomfortable, but he reassured me: "No, no, don't worry, I love you, I don't listen to it..." Continuing to stare at me with his blue eyes and I was, as far as I could be, calm. The library was very extensive because there were five very huge rooms for the 50,000 volumes and it was me and him alone, isolated on a high floor of this immense palace. And I trusted. I trusted his blue eyes, I trusted him his sincere way of telling me "I love you".'

— Roberto Leoni

Roberto Leoni stated that an episode with a patient in the psychiatric hospital was probably the origin of Santa Sangre because over time he conceived "a story in which even the worst demon actually can't forget he is an angel." In fact, Fénix, the character that Leoni created together with Jodorowsky, is a serial killer, but "…every time he kills you feel sorry for him; that is, you are sorry more for him than for the victim."

== Release ==
Though a Mexican and Italian co-production, Santa Sangre is in English. In the United States, it was primarily rated NC-17 for "several scenes of extremely explicit violence". An edited version was released with an R rating for "bizarre, graphic violence and sensuality, and for drug content". Regardless, Santa Sangre did not receive a wide release in the U.S., only screening at a few theaters familiar with Jodorowsky's previous work.

In 2004 Anchor Bay released a DVD in the UK. On 25 January 2011, Severin Films gave the film a release on both DVD and Blu-ray with more than "five hours of exclusive extras". On Halloween 2019, Mórbido Fest held a celebratory 30th anniversary screening of Santa Sangre remastered in 4K by Severin Films from a scan of the original camera negative. In Italy, from 25 to 27 November 2019, the Videa film society celebrated the 30th anniversary by screening the 4K restored version at select theatres.

== Reception ==
=== Critical response ===
The film generally was critically well received, eventually being ranked 476th on Empire's 2008 list of the 500 greatest movies of all time. A reviewer from the British Film 4 describing the film as "one of Jodorowsky's finest films" which "resonates with all the disturbing power of a clammy nightmare filtered through the hallucinatory lens of 1960s psychedelia."

Roger Ebert said that he believed it carried the moral message of genuinely opposing evil, rather than celebrating it like most contemporary horror films. Ebert described it as "a horror film, one of the greatest, and after waiting patiently through countless Dead Teenager Movies, I am reminded by Alejandro Jodorowsky that true psychic horror is possible on the screen – horror, poetry, surrealism, psychological pain, and wicked humor, all at once."

As of September 2024, the film had an 89% rating on review aggregator website Rotten Tomatoes based on 44 reviews, with a weighted average of 7.4/10. The site's consensus stated: "Those unfamiliar with Alejandro Jodorowsky's style may find it overwhelming, but Santa Sangre is a provocative psychedelic journey featuring the director's signature touches of violence, vulgarity, and an oddly personal moral center."

=== Accolades ===
The film was screened at the V Muestra de Cine Mexicano en Guadalajara where several groups of people left the room during the screening.

Award	Date of ceremony	Category	Recipient(s)	Result	Ref(s)
Cannes Film Festival	11–23 May 1989	Un Certain Regard Award	Alejandro Jodorowsky	Nominated	
Sitges Film Festival	6–14 October 1989	Best Director	Alejandro Jodorowsky	Nominated	
Chicago International Film Festival	1989	Best Director	Alejandro Jodorowsky	Nominated	
Paris International Festival of Fantastic and Science-Fiction Film	1989	Best Film		Won	
Brussels International Fantastic Film Festival	1990	Best Director	Alejandro Jodorowsky	Nominated	
IMAGFIC - Festival Internacional de Cine Imaginario de Madrid	1990	Best Film		Won	
Saturn Awards	1991	Best Performance by a Younger Actor	Adan Jodorowsky	Won	
Saturn Awards	1991	Best Horror Film		Nominated	
Saturn Awards	1991	Best Actor	Axel Jodorowsky	Nominated	
Saturn Awards	1991	Best Actress	Blanca Guerra	Nominated	
Saturn Awards	1991	Best Performance by a Younger Actor	Faviola Elenka Tapia	Nominated	
Saturn Awards	1991	Best Director	Alejandro Jodorowsky	Nominated	
Saturn Awards	1991	Best Music	Simon Boswell	Nominated	

Santa Sangre is considered a cult movie and the restored print of the film was screened in 2008 Cannes Classics.

It was also screened during Locarno Film Festival 2016 Histoire(s) du cinéma: Pardo d'onore Swisscom Alejandro Jodorowsky.

== Cultural references ==
In 2001 filmmaker David Gregory released a "making-of" documentary film titled Forget Everything You Have Ever Seen: The World of Santa Sangre. It features interviews with members of the cast and crew.
