= Jenny Wright =

American actress

- Occupation: Actress
- Years active: 1981–1998
- Known for: I, Madman; Young Guns II; St. Elmo's Fire; The Lawnmower Man

Jenny Wright is an American retired actress who made her film debut portraying the role of Cushie in the comedy-drama The World According to Garp in 1982.

== Career ==
In 1982, Wright made an appearance in the musical drama film Pink Floyd – The Wall, playing an American groupie. She had roles in both The Wild Life (1984) as Eileen and St. Elmo's Fire (1985) as Felicia. She also starred with Anthony Michael Hall in the 1986 thriller Out of Bounds, with Adrian Pasdar as Mae in the 1987 cult horror classic Near Dark, and alongside Ilan Mitchell-Smith in the 1988 drama The Chocolate War. Wright had a lead role in 1989's I, Madman, and small parts in the films Young Guns II (1990) and The Lawnmower Man (1992).

== Filmography ==
Year	Film/TV show	Role	Notes
1981	The Doctors	Robin Pruitt	
1982	The World According to Garp	Cushie	
1982	Love, Sidney	Jan	Episodes: "Jan: Part 1", "Jan: Part 2"
1982	The Executioner's Song	April Baker	
1982	Pink Floyd – The Wall	American Groupie	
1984	The Wild Life	Eileen	
1985	St. Elmo's Fire	Felicia Hicks	
1986	Out of Bounds	Dizz/Darlene	
1987	Near Dark	Mae	Won: Paris International Fantastic & Sci-Fi Film Festival – Best Actress (1988)
1987	Crime Story	Pamela Palmer	Episode: "The Senator, the Movie Star, and the Mob"
1988	The Chocolate War	Lisa	
1988	Midnight Caller	Angel	Episode: "Conversations with an Assassin"
1989	I, Madman	Virginia	Nominated: Saturn Award for Best Actress
1989	Valentino Returns	Sylvia Fuller	
1989	Twister	Stephanie	
1989	Gideon Oliver	Coombs	Episode: "Sleep Well, Professor Oliver"
1990	Young Guns II	Jane Greathouse	
1990	A Shock to the System	Melanie O'Conner	
1990	Capital News	Doreen Duncan	
1991	Queens Logic	Asha	
1991	Matlock	Ginnie Morell	Episode: "The Marriage Counselor"
1992	The Lawnmower Man	Marnie Burke	
1994	Sirens	Reporter #2	Episode: "A Cop First"
1997	NYPD Blue	Trish Taylor	Episode: "Upstairs, Downstairs"
1998	Enchanted	Little Natalie's Mother	
