= Mariano Baino =

Italian film director

- Born: 17 March 1967 (age 59); Naples, Italy
- Occupations: Film director, screenwriter, editor, painter
- Years active: 1989 – present

Mariano Baino (born March 17, 1967) is a visual artist, film director, screenwriter, and editor, mainly working in the horror genre. Mariano Baino has been honoured with a rare “Extraordinary Ability Green Card” by the US Government for his talent as a film director and currently resides in New York.

He has been hailed as “one of the great torch-bearers for expressionistic genre cinema” by Montreal's Fantasia Film Festival. where his film Dark Waters received the Prix Du Public.

== Career ==
Born in Naples, Italy, he started shooting short films at an early age and, at 18, started working as a production assistant in shows for Italian television.

=== Director ===
A year later he moved to London, England, where in 1990 he wrote and directed the short film Caruncula. Novelist Ramsey Campbell called Caruncula "Not only a fine tribute to the Italian horror masters, but a small masterpiece of sustained perversity in its own right."

In 1994, Baino made his feature film debut with Dark Waters, an atmospheric horror movie inspired by the short stories of H. P. Lovecraft. Despite a troubled production in Ukraine, the movie achieved critical acclaim and is experiencing a still growing attention from horror fans and arthouse fans alike. The film received prestigious gala screenings at the legendary Lincoln Center in New York, as well as the National Cinema Museum in Turin, Italy. Dark Waters was released in a special edition double disc box-set in the USA in 2007 and, in July 2014, The Ecstasy of Film re-released the film in France in a new collectors' edition. The same company also released, always for the French market, Baino's The Trinity of Darkness. In 2017, the film received a Blu-Ray release in the United States via Severin Films and, in 2018, the film was released in Italy on DVD by Shockproof.

In March 2017, his short film LADY M 5.1, an experimental science fiction adaptation of Lady Macbeth's soliloquy from Shakespeare's Macbeth, made its debut at Mana Contemporary accompanied by a multimedia installation co-created with Coralina Cataldi-Tassoni.

In 2022, Baino began production on his sophomore feature film Astrid's Saints. Co-written and co-produced with star Coralina Cataldi Tassoni, the film is expected to premiere at the L'Étrange Festival in September 2024.

=== Screenwriting ===
Baino has also worked as a screenwriter for hire for many years while developing his own directing projects. He wrote the surreal drama Flower of Shame for German producer Vesna Jovanoska who also hired him to adapt Chris Niles' urban thriller Hell's Kitchen for the screen. In 2008, he was commissioned to write the screenplay for Thy Kingdom Come, a Re-Dark production shot in Argentina with an American cast and directed by Estonian born auteur Ilmar Taska. The film was released in Italy and Spain at the end of 2010, and a US release followed in 2011.

Baino was hired to rewrite The Curse of The Vij, based on Nikolai Gogol's legendary short story, for production company Film-maker srl and director Robert Englund.

He shares "Story by" credit with Coralina Cataldi-Tassoni on Hidden 3D. The movie is an English language Canadian/Italian co-production which counts among its producers Oscar winner Don Carmody.

=== Visual artist ===
Baino is also a renowned multimedia artist with successful exhibitions in the USA and Europe, most recently CYPHERS AND FLAMES at the SoapBox Gallery, Brooklyn, IMAGO IGNIS and VULTUS VELI at the magnificent Hall of the Leprosarium, in Naples, Italy, LUCTUS IGNIS at the Savoy Multiplex in Rome, and ARS INFECTA at The M.A.C.R.O. Museum of Contemporary Art in Rome.

== Filmography ==
as Writer, Director and Editor:

- Dream Car (1989)
- Caruncula (1990)
- Dark Waters (1994)
- Astrid's Saints (2024)

as Writer, Director, Producer and Editor:

- Never Ever After (2005)
- The Trinity of Darkness (2014)
- Lady M 5.1 (2017)

as Writer:

- Thy Kingdom Come (2008)
- The Curse of The Vij (2009)
- Hidden 3D (Story by) (2011)
