= Paris International Festival of Fantastic and Science-Fiction Film =

Defunct Film festival

Festival international de Paris du film fantastique et de science-fiction
- Location: Paris, France
- Founded: 15 May 1972; 54 years ago (as Convention Française du Cinéma Fantastique)
- Awards: Licorne d'Or (English: Golden Licorn)
- Artistic director: Alain Schlockoff
- Language: International

The Paris International Festival of Fantastic and Science-Fiction Film (French: Festival international de Paris du film fantastique et de science-fiction) was a film festival hosted in France between 1972 and 1989. The event was affiliated with film periodical L'Écran fantastique, and chaired by its Chief Editor Alain Schlockoff. The festival is remembered for its raucous atmosphere, which left a durable impression on a number of attending filmmakers. It was one of the founding members of the European Fantastic Film Festivals Federation in 1987.

== History ==
=== Early years ===
The first edition of the festival, which took place at Nanterre's Théâtre des Amandiers, did not feature a competition because the host city was governed by the French Communist Party, and pitting international artists against each other was viewed as incompatible with socialist values. Therefore, the second edition of the festival, which by then had moved to the Palace in Paris, was the first competitive event. The festival's main award was the Golden Licorn, awarded to the best film.

The festival received early support from British studio Hammer Film Productions, an association it maintained through the years. The inaugural edition's guest of honor was Hammer star Peter Cushing, and it featured a retrospective of the company's films. Other Hammer mainstays like Terence Fisher and Christopher Lee made appearances in the event's formative years.

=== Grand Rex era ===
For its sixth edition the festival moved to the Grand Rex, one of Paris' best known art déco buildings. It remained there until its penultimate edition, and the venue has become associated with the event's golden years.

Italian director Dario Argento has likened the festival's atmosphere to "a rock concert", and mentioned Suspiria's Paris premiere, where he was borne aloft in triumph by fans, as one of the moments that helped him realize his newfound stature in the film industry. Fellow Italian Lucio Fulci is said to have embraced his late conversion to the horror genre based on the raucous reception his film The Beyond received in Paris. About the festival's crowds, Sam Raimi declared: "Now everytime I do something [in a film], I think of the Rex's audience and what will make them scream."

=== Final years ===
While the festival's populist approach at first made for compelling headlines, fan antics eventually hurt its reputation, and security staff became its number one expense. In later years, some cinephiles have lamented the event's takeover by unsophisticated crowds, drawn more by the irreverent atmosphere than by the films.

Conversely, as fantastique gained mainstream acceptance during the 1980s, larger distributors yearned for the cachet of the rival Avoriaz Festival, which attracted international stars to its upscale alpine location, and typically recognized only the most prestigious productions in the genre.

According to Schlockoff, the festival's demise was sealed when he accepted an offer by the Palais des sports de Paris to co-organize the event and procure sponsors for the 1990 edition, only to see their presenting corporate partner withdraw due to concerns about the imminent Gulf War. The same circumstances led to the cancellation of another French genre film gathering, the 1990 Festival du film policier de Cognac. But while the Cognac event was able to resume in 1991, re-establishing the Paris festival – which was run without public money – following that hiatus proved too complex.

== List of winning films ==
Edition	Year	Best Film	Country	Venue
I	1972	No competition at the request of the host city		Théatre des Amandiers, Nanterre
II	1973	Asylum	United Kingdom	Théatre Le Palace, Paris
III	1974	The Wicker Man	United Kingdom	Cinéma Monge Palace, Paris
IV	1975	Bug	United States	Palais des Congrès, Paris
V	1976	Death Race 2000	United States	Palais des Congrès, Paris
VI	1977	H.G. Wells' The Food of the Gods	United States; Canada	Grand Rex, Paris
VII	1978	Eaten Alive	United States	Grand Rex, Paris
VIII	1979	Halloween	United States	Grand Rex, Paris
IX	1979^{1}	Dracula	United States	Grand Rex, Paris
X	1980	The Rat Savior	Yugoslavia	Grand Rex, Paris
XI	1981	Mad Max	Australia	Grand Rex, Paris
XII	1982	Next of Kin	Australia; New Zealand	Grand Rex, Paris
XIII	1983	Xtro	United Kingdom	Grand Rex, Paris
XIV	1984	Death Warmed Up	New Zealand; Australia	Grand Rex, Paris
XV	1986^{2}	House	United States	Grand Rex, Paris
XVI	1987	Evil Dead 2	United States	Grand Rex, Paris
XVII	1988	Near Dark	United States	Grand Rex, Paris
XVIII	1989	Santa Sangre	Mexico; Italy	Maison de la Mutualité, Paris

=== Footnotes ===
1. Two editions were held in the calendar year 1979 as the festival moved from March to November.
2. No event was held in the calendar year 1985 as the festival reverted to its previous March slot.
