= Avoriaz International Fantastic Film Festival =

- Location: Morzine-Avoriaz, Haute-Savoie, France
- Started: 1973
- Founded by: Gérard Brémond, Lionel Chouchan
- Most recent: 1993
- Successor: Gérardmer International Fantastic Film Festival; Avoriaz French Film Festival
- Artistic director: Jean-Claude Romer
- Festival date: January
- Language: International

The Avoriaz International Fantastic Film Festival (French: Festival international du film fantastique d'Avoriaz) was a film festival held in the French resort of Avoriaz between 1973 and 1993. It was the precursor to the current Gérardmer International Fantastic Film Festival.

Unlike many such events, the Avoriaz festival did not have grassroots origins. Organized as a vehicle for the eponymous skiing resort, it intended to promote the genre and its host town to a mainstream audience, with a level of glamour typically associated with more accepted film genres. The New York Times called it "a great success, the high point of many junketing French journalists' winters" and the Financial Times wrote that its two decades of existence had turned Avoriaz into "a momentary movie mecca". In its time, the festival was hailed as the premier fantasy film event in the world, although recent assessments have ranked Sitges, which outlasted it by a considerable margin, as the genre's foremost gathering.

== History ==
=== Origins ===
The festival was the brainchild of leisure entrepreneur Gérard Brémond of Pierre & Vacances and advertiser fr:Lionel Chouchan. Brémond had established the ski resort of Avoriaz in 1966, in cooperation with Olympic downhill skiing gold medallist Jean Vuarnet. He commissioned Chouchan to create an event that would help publicize his winter sports business. Chouchan suggested a fantastic film festival after witnessing the resort's eerie sightlines, which were influenced by organic architecture. Daniel Goldman, the head of Cinema International Corporation in France, was an early adherent to the project and helped procure screening rights to many American films.

Savvy promotion and strong corporate backing elevated the event to a level of relevance unheard of for a speciality film gathering, with ample news and talk show coverage on the home country's most watched channels. France Inter set up a studio at the Hotel des Drômonts during the festival, and many national television talk shows were broadcast from the festival. TF1 was a presenting partner, while Antenne 2 sponsored a special award, the Golden Antenna, sometimes in the same year. A 1990 survey found that the festival was known to 93% of the French public, second only to Cannes.

=== Style ===
In comparison to the more traditional approach of the Paris International Festival of Fantastic and Science-Fiction Film, Avoriaz made a concerted effort to distance itself from the genre's exploitation roots, with Chouchan saying "We couldn't just have the upteenth film with Vincent Price or Christopher Lee [...] There had to be a new fantastique." From the beginning, Brémond had promoted Avoriaz by gifting all-inclusive holidays to popular singers and actors in exchange for publicity shots, and a similar practice was used for the festival itself. Unlike Sitges, Avoriaz actively courted celebrity jurors with art or mainstream cinema credentials, which was as much an effort to legitimize the genre as it was a nudge to mass media. By Chouchan's own retrospective admission, Avoriaz was an image-conscious and exclusive affair, with few members of the public allowed within the festival's perimeter, although it was partly due to the resort's limited capacity. This led to accusations of manufactured elitism from both special and general interest publications, such as the Cahiers du Cinéma and L'Express. Lucio Fulci, an Italian director whose career straddled the line between mainstream and exploitation cinema, said: "[In Paris] the public was really sympathetic, with a sweet smell of weed. [...] Whereas in Avoriaz, it was very snobbish, many people didn't care about anything."

The inaugural Grand Prix, awarded to Steven Spielberg's Duel in his first award win for a longform feature, did much to establish the festival's credibility when the director rose to international fame in the following years. Spielberg would return in 1977 to serve as jury president, a position he would not accept again until the 2013 Festival de Cannes.

While its palmares was generally regarded as being of a high quality, the event's overtures towards cinema auteurs sometimes exposed a gap between the films it showcased and the expectations of the cultural establishment it courted. Hollywood actress and Avoriaz juror Leslie Caron expressed outrage at The Texas Chain Saw Massacre, which made its belated appearance at the 1976 festival due to censorship issues, calling it "beastly, vile and dehumanizing". The star-studded jury, which also included Sergei Bondarchuk, Eugène Ionesco, Agnès Varda, Jacques Tati, Iannis Xenakis and president Michaelangelo Antonioni, refused to award the Grand Prize that year on the basis on an excessively weak selection. The Texas Chain Saw Massacre took the Critics' Prize. In 1985, popular actor Michel Blanc—who was a festival guest but not a jury member—publicly and repeatedly lambasted The Terminator, calling it "a harrowingly dumb film". The film still won the Grand Prize and the French market ended up contributing a disproportionate amount to its worldwide gross.

=== Segregation of genre and art films ===
By the second half of the 1980s, Brémond and Chouchan were growing uneasy about fantastic cinema's increasingly graphic nature amidst the gore boom of the time, which put the event at odds with Avoriaz's desired family friendly image and ushered in the first rumors of its demise. In response, the 1986 Festival confined slasher and horror films to a minor, separate competition called the Fear Section (French: Section Peur). However, the distinction between films whose artistic merits were deemed worthy of the main competition and those that would be relegated to the Fear Section was unclear. For instance, the original Hellraiser was consigned to the Fear Section, but when it proved successful, the second installment was accepted into the main bracket. Furthermore, due to its restrictive niche, the Fear Section often had to be padded with the type of low budget horror fare the organizers were keen to avoid in the first place. Today the Fear Section is largely remembered for providing an outlet for some films from the dying days of Italian genre cinema. Most notably, Michele Soavi, one of the country's last internationally recognized genre directors, won his first award in the 1987 Fear Section for Stage Fright.

In 1989, the Festival added another award, the Prix de l'Étrange (approximately translating as "Eeriness Prize"), in order to further highlight atmospheric films over graphic ones. In 1990, the Fear Section was closed outright, and extreme cinema was limited to out-of-competition screenings.

=== Demise and relocation to Gérardmer ===
As the 1980s gave rise to bigger, high concept productions, the festival's handpicked juries of prestigious but subversion-prone auteurs clashed with the heightened commercial expectations such films generated, and strained its relationship with major distributors. Fox executives threatened a boycott when their two odds-on favorites, The Fly and RoboCop were passed for top honors in 1986 and 1987 respectively, with Le Monde conceding that RoboCop probably would have won the Grand Prize, had its heavy advertising campaign not antagonized the jury headed by Sidney Lumet. While Columbia Tri-Star provided the 1992 Festival with its showpiece in The Addams Family, the film left empty handed, and the distributor refused to do the same the following year with the highly anticipated Dracula. As the film was scheduled to open in France right after the festival, Chouchan and Brémond interpreted the decision as a deliberate snub. Further highlighting the absence of Coppola's film, that edition featured a Dracula retrospective and Christopher Lee as president in the jury. Festival executives subsequently complained that large distributors were now demanding award guarantees to enter their flagship films in the event, something they did not want to give.

Avoriaz's rift with the majors necessitated a return to smaller—and gorier—films, although there was an attempt to do so through the prism of dark comedies like The Borrower, Mutant Action, Army of Darkness and Braindead. Brémond cites the appalled reaction of former prime minister Michel Rocard, whom he had invited to a screening of eventual 1993 Grand Prix winner Braindead, and the failure of that film at the box office, as the final hint that the fantastic genre was not an appropriate vehicle for his real estate ventures anymore. The emergence of home video as the primary outlet for much of the independent genre production also meant that such films carried fewer chances of crossing over to the mainstream.

Following the 1993 edition, Brémond pulled the plug on the event. As a more wholesome alternative, he launched the Avoriaz French Film Festival the following year. Industry sources suggested that beyond his disenchantment with fantasy films, Brémond may have been looking to attract more public subsidies and ingratiate himself to the French entertainment industry, as he was venturing into filmmaking with his new company Marathon Productions.

Ultimately, the French Film Festival underperformed and was shut down after just three years. For his part, Chouchan took the original concept to the Vosges resort of Gérardmer and created a spiritual successor, the Gérardmer International Fantastic Film Festival, which still exists as of 2022.

== Grand Prix history ==
Year	Film	Director	Country	Jury president
1973	Duel	Steven Spielberg	United States	René Clément
1974	Soylent Green	Richard Fleischer	United States	Silvia Monfort
1975	Phantom of the Paradise	Brian De Palma	United States	Roman Polanski
1976	Not awarded			Michelangelo Antonioni
1977	Carrie	Brian De Palma	United States	Steven Spielberg
1978	Full Circle	Richard Loncraine	Canada; United Kingdom	William Friedkin
1979	Patrick	Richard Franklin	Australia	Roger Corman
1980	Time After Time	Nicholas Meyer	United States	Sydney Pollack
1981	The Elephant Man	David Lynch	United States	Norman Jewison
1982	Mad Max 2	George Miller	Australia	Jeanne Moreau
1983	The Dark Crystal	Jim Henson; Frank Oz	United States; United Kingdom	George Miller
1984	The Lift	Dick Maas	Netherlands	John Frankenheimer
1985	The Terminator	James Cameron	United States	Robert De Niro
1986	Dream Lover	Alan J. Pakula	United States	Richard Lester
1987	Blue Velvet	David Lynch	United States	Philippe de Broca
1988	The Hidden	Jack Sholder	United States	Sidney Lumet
1989	Dead Ringers	David Cronenberg	Canada; United States	Terence Stamp
1990	I, Madman	Tibor Takacs	United States	Jerry Schatzberg
1991	Tales from the Darkside: The Movie	John Harrison	United States	Michael Cimino
1992	Escape from the 'Liberty' Cinema	Wojciech Marczewski	Poland	Malcolm McDowell
1993	Braindead	Peter Jackson	New Zealand	Christopher Lee

== In popular culture ==
Avoriaz, les fantômes du festival, a crime novel talking place during a fictionalized version of the festival, was written by author Gilbert Picard and published in France in 1990.
