= Dark Waters (1993 film) =

- DVD cover art
- Directed by: Mariano Baino
- Written by: Mariano Baino; Andrew M. Bark
- Produced by: Victor Zuev
- Starring: Louise Salter; Venera Simmons; Maria Kapnist
- Cinematography: Alex Howe
- Edited by: Mariano Baino
- Music by: Igor Clark
- Production company: Victor Zuev Productions
- Release date: 29 December 1993
- Running time: 94 minutes
- Countries: Russia; Ukraine; Italy; United Kingdom
- Language: English

Dark Waters (also known as Dead Waters in the American home-video edition), is a 1993 horror film directed by Mariano Baino, who co-wrote it with Andy Bark and also served as the editor.

== Plot ==
On an isolated island in a church, a priest is reading scripture on some ancient demonic artefacts, at the same time a young girl gives a Nun a similar looking artefact, after which she heads to the church. The church is suddenly flooded and the priest is stabbed by a floating cross. The following morning the nun holding the artefact (a sort of demonic medallion) falls to her death from the cliffs after being pushed by an unseen force.

A young woman named Elizabeth (Louise Salter) arrives at the island convent during a heavy rainstorm. Her father has recently died, leaving her an orphan. She has returned to the island of her birth in order to determine whether to continue her father's donations to the convent. Her friend Teresa was living at the convent but is murdered by an unseen assailant before Elizabeth arrives after spying on the nuns performing a sort of Ritual and trying to steal part of a pagan artifact. Elizabeth meets the ancient Mother Superior, who is blind. In lieu of a Teresa, she is instead met by an innocent-seeming novice named Sarah, who tells her Teresa went back to London and she will be her guide. Elizabeth tells Sarah that she was born on the island and lived there until she was seven. Her mother had died while giving birth to her.

Elizabeth and Sarah visit a decaying library located in the convent. They look at an illustration of a demon and a painting which shows two young girls and a pagan amulet. They are temporarily separated. Elizabeth is attacked by a nun, who dies by falling out a window. Elizabeth discovers an entrance into a labyrinth of catacomb. Here, a procession of nuns carries a bloody corpse wrapped in a sheet. Elizabeth, who has gotten lost, finds a pit-like room where a blind painter has covered the walls and canvases with enigmatic images. She recognises one of the faces on the wall as Teresa and concludes the body the nuns were carrying might well have been her corpse.

The next day: Elizabeth has come to distrust Sarah. The former now has strange dreams and visions. Elizabeth goes to her childhood home and questions the old woman who cared for her as a child. Their meeting is interrupted when the nuns set fire to the house. Elizabeth alone escapes. Back at the convent, dead and dying nuns are everywhere. In the catacombs, Elizabeth is approached by Sarah. The latter removes the top of her cassock to reveal that much of her body is not human. Sarah is Elizabeth's sister, who more closely resembles their demon mother. The nuns had attempted to prevent Elizabeth from realizing her heritage and freeing their mother from the crypt.

Sarah and Elizabeth begin the ritual, just as they had as children. The pieces of the shattered amulet are placed on the ground by a nun, who they make into a human sacrifice. Drops of blood restores the broken amulet. Their demon mother begins to break free of her prison. As she had when young, Elizabeth, now afraid, throws the amulet down. It shatters once more into pieces. Sarah goes to the demon mother and Elizabeth escapes.

Elizabeth joins the convent. She wears a necklace made of the central fragment of the shattered amulet, and her eyes, covered in cataracts, now resemble those of the blind Mother Superior.

== Cast ==
- Louise Salter as Elizabeth
  - Tanya Dobrovolskaya as Young Elizabeth
- Venera Simmons as Sarah
  - Kristina Spivak as Young Sarah
- Maria Kapnist as Mother Superior
- Lubov Snegur as Mother Superior's Assistant
- Alvina Skarga as Old Blind Woman
- Anna Rose Phipps as Theresa

== Production ==
The film was originally based on a short story by Andy Bark, inspired by a childhood visit to Staithes in North Yorkshire. Many years later, having worked as editor on Mariano's film, Caruncula, he mentioned that he was working on a script called Dark Waters and he and Mariano began to work on it together.

The film, perhaps the first Western film to be shot in Ukraine following the collapse of the Soviet Union, was a difficult and troubled one. The system there created many problems, but provided spectacular yet cheap sets and locations that would have been impossible to get in the UK. The political situation tried its best to halt the production. In the early days, when finance was being sought by Bark and Mariano, a coup attempt that saw tanks on the streets of Moscow could not have helped matters. There was even another coup at the end of filming when Mariano, in Moscow for the dubbing, was awoken by gun fire.

In Chapter 5 of his autobiography It's Only A Movie, Mark Kermode gives a detailed account of his attempts to file a set report on the movie, which were constantly frustrated by travel problems in and around Ukraine.

== Release ==
A Blu-ray version was released on April 11, 2017 in North America.

== Reception ==
Jon Condit from Dread Central awarded the film a score of 4 out of 5, commending the film's atmosphere. Robert Firsching from Allmovie offered the film similar praise, writing, "the most exciting genre debut of the decade, Dark Waters is a stylish, frightening occult film with the Lovecraftian overtones of Lucio Fulci and the visual flair of Dario Argento, pointing to its creator, Mariano Baino, as perhaps the next great Italian horror director."
