= I, Madman =

- Original theatrical poster
- Directed by: Tibor Takács
- Written by: David Chaskin
- Produced by: Rafael Eisenman
- Starring: Jenny Wright; Clayton Rohner
- Cinematography: Bryan England
- Edited by: Marcus Manton
- Music by: Michael Hoenig
- Production company: Trans World Entertainment
- Distributed by: Trans World Entertainment
- Release date: March 31, 1989
- Running time: 89 minutes
- Country: United States
- Language: English
- Budget: $3 million

I, Madman is a 1989 American supernatural slasher film directed by Tibor Takács and starring Jenny Wright and Clayton Rohner. Its plot follows a Los Angeles bookstore worker who becomes engrossed in a horror novel titled I, Madman, and finds a series of murders resembling those in the book occurring around her. The film's working title was Hardcover, and it was released in some international markets under this name.

Released regionally by Trans World Entertainment in the spring of 1989, the film later screened at the Avoriaz International Fantastic Film Festival in January 1990, where it won the Grand Prize award for best feature. While some film critics derided its pacing and graphic violence, others praised the film for its visual style and mixture of elements from classic monster movies and film noir.

== Plot ==
Virginia Clayton, an aspiring actress who works at a used bookstore in downtown Los Angeles, becomes absorbed in the pulp horror novels of the late author Malcolm Brand. Virginia's detective boyfriend, Richard, begins to grow concerned about her fixation on the books, which she becomes immersed in during her free time, occasionally having daydreams in which their villain, the deformed serial killer Dr. Kessler, appears to her.

Richard sleeps over at Virginia's apartment one night, during which she stays up late reading a passage from the Brand novel I, Madman, in which Kessler, having gone mad and carved off his own facial features, brutally kills victims and grafts parts of their faces onto his own. Kessler in particular becomes obsessed with beautiful actress Anna Templar. In one graphic passage, Kessler stalks and attacks a woman, incapacitating her in her apartment with a sedative before scalping her with a straight razor.

While working in the bookstore, Virginia comes across a set of books from Brand's personal estate that have been sold to the store, among them graphic medical literature. Outside, she sees a newspaper detailing the brutal murder of her acting classmate Collette Berkowitz, which resembles the scalping murder Virginia read about in the novel. From her apartment window, Virginia witnesses Kessler murder a man in the building across the street and cut off his ears. Richard is appointed to investigate the murder, which has left Virginia traumatized. Virginia insists that Kessler has manifested in reality and envisions her as a real-life analog of Anna Templar, wanting to carve out her heart as his ultimate victim. Virginia's claims lead investigators to believe she is mentally ill.

Virginia examines the book, and notices on the title page that it has been classified as nonfiction. She visits Brand's publishing office and questions Sidney Zeit, the head publisher, about the books' history. Sidney recounts how Brant requested his works be classed as nonfiction, and believed his characters had come to life and tormented him. Sidney assumed Brant was schizophrenic, and reveals he was found mutilated in his home. This leads Virginia to believe that it is in fact Brand's ghost who is tormenting her rather than the Kessler character. One night on an unpopulated block of Hollywood Boulevard, Virginia witnesses another of her classmates, Lenny, brutally murdered by Kessler. In an attempt to capture the killer, Richard unsuccessfully has Virginia attempt to lure him inside the local library.

Back at her apartment, Virginia reads another passage from the novel that leads her to fear for the safety of Mona, her coworker working the nightshift at the bookstore. Virginia rushes to the store to save Mona, but finds her dead with her lips cut off. Kessler appears and pursues Virginia, who finds she has been locked in by the store's security gate. Virginia is saved by Richard, who shoots Kessler moments before he is about to slash Virginia with a razor, but the gunshot only momentarily stops him. He is ultimately killed by a demon from the novel who appears and hurls him out the window.

== Cast ==
- Jenny Wright as Virginia Clayton
- Clayton Rohner as Richard
- Randall William Cook as Dr. Alan Kessler/ Malcolm Brand
- Stephanie Hodge as Mona
- Michelle Jordan as Colette Berkowitz
- Vance Valencia as Sgt. Navarro
- Mary Baldwin as Librarian
- Murray Rubin as Sidney Zeit
- Steven Memel as Lenny
- Raf Nazario as Lyle, Hotel Clerk (as Rafael Nazario)
- Bob Frank as Hotel Manager
- Bruce Wagner as Pianist

== Production ==
In addition to acting in the film, Randall William Cook also served as a make-up artist and stop motion effects supervisor having provided stop motion work on Tibor Takács' prior film The Gate.

Principal photography began on November 30, 1987 in Los Angeles.

== Release ==
The film had a regional release in some U.S. cities in the spring of 1989, opening in Sacramento on March 31, and the following week in Detroit. It premiered in Los Angeles on October 13, 1989. The film was screened at the 1990 Avoriaz International Fantastic Film Festival in Avoriaz, France in January 1990.

=== Critical response ===
Joe Baltake, writing for The Sacramento Bee, derided the film for being derivative, noting: "Everything that can be done has been done, in terms of shock, and so someone like Takacs ends up littering his ugly little killings with mutilation."

Juan Carlos Coto of the Miami Herald praised the film's "pulp" visual style, but conceded that the film "plod[s] in the middle and Wright isn't always engrossing... I, Madman will probably lose you if you're not a trash-and-slash fan. But if you are, this is one movie to curl up with." The staff critic of the New York Daily News praised the film's premise, likening it to that of A Nightmare on Elm Street (1984), but added that its plot receives "mostly dull and static treatment," largely involving the "less-than-arresting" relationship between the lead characters.

Roger Ebert praised the film, writing: "Climaxes in thrillers have gotten pretty standard recently, involving chases and shootouts and a lot of blood. I, Madman has some surprises... [and] places its terrors where they belong, in the midst of everyday life." The Chicago Tribune's Johanna Steinmetz also praised the film for its suspense and employment of "the power of suggestiveness" despite its graphic violence, awarding it three out of four stars. Chris Willman of the Los Angeles Times wrote: "Nonsensical and silly as I, Madman often is, die-hard genre fans may want to seek it out because Canadian director Tibor Takacs (whose only previous feature was The Gate) has a real sense of style that pulls you in and makes you pay attention even when the story disappoints."

Writing for The Movie Guide (1992), James Monaco lauded it as a "wonderful horror film... As reminiscent of House of Wax or Frankenstein as it is of current-day slasher films, I, Madman is a loving salute to the days when movie monsters had hearts." In his book The Gorehound's Guide to Splatter Films of the 1960s and 1970s, Scott Aaron Stine praised the film as an "atypical take on the slasher genre [that] is a reasonably impressive effort."

==== Accolades ====
Award	Category	Nominee	Result	Ref.
Academy of Science Fiction, Fantasy & Horror Films	Saturn Award for Best Actress	Jenny Wright	Nominated	
Avoriaz Fantastic Film Festival	Grand Prize	Tibor Takács	Won	

=== Home media ===
Media Home Entertainment released it on VHS on November 29, 1989. MGM Home Entertainment released a full frame DVD of the film on August 26, 2003. Scream Factory released the film for the first time on Blu-ray on July 21, 2015. This release went out of print on December 11, 2019.

== Sources ==
- Monaco, James (1992). The Movie Guide. New York City, New York: Perigee Books. ISBN 978-0-399-51780-8.
- Puchalski, Steven (2002) [1996]. Slimetime: A Guide to Sleazy, Mindless Movies. Manchester, England: Critical Vision. ISBN 978-1-900-48621-7.
- Stine, Scott Aaron (2015). The Gorehound's Guide to Splatter Films of the 1960s and 1970s. Jefferson, North Carolina: McFarland. ISBN 978-0-786-49140-7.
