= Bryan Madorsky =

Canadian actor (born 1977)

- Born: 24 August 1977 (age 49); Canada
- Occupations: Accountant, former child actor
- Years active: 1986–1989

Bryan Madorsky is a Canadian former child actor who currently is an accountant.

Madorsky's first and best known role is that of Michael Laemle in Bob Balaban's horror comedy film Parents, starring Randy Quaid, Mary Beth Hurt and Sandy Dennis.
