= Leandro (given name) =

- Gender: Male

Other names
- Related names: Leander

Leandro is a masculine Italian, Portuguese and Spanish given name. The name comes from Leander, a character in the Greek myth Hero and Leander. There's also a variation of the name in French: Léandre.

== Given name ==
- Leandro (footballer, born 1959) (born José Leandro de Souza Ferreira), Brazilian footballer
- Leandro (footballer, born 1977) (born Leandro Almeida da Silva), Brazilian footballer
- Leandro (footballer, born April 1979) (born Leandro da Silva Wanderley), Brazilian footballer
- Leandro (footballer, born October 1979) (born Leandro Bernardi Silva), Brazilian footballer
- Leandro (footballer, born 1982) (born Leandro Marcolini Pedroso de Almeida), Brazilian footballer
- Leandro (footballer, born 1983) (born Leandro de Oliveira da Luz), Brazilian footballer
- Leandro (footballer, born February 1985) (born Leandro Montera da Silva), Brazilian footballer
- Leandro (footballer, born 1993) (born Weverson Leandro Oliveira Moura), Brazilian footballer
- Leandro (footballer, born 1995) (born Leandro Fonteles de Queiroz, 1995), Brazilian footballer
- Leandro (footballer, born 2003) (born Leandro Pinto Bernardo), Brazilian footballer
- Leandro (footballer, born 2004) (born Leandro Mathias Silva Bueno), Brazilian footballer
- Leandro Aguirre (born 1989), Argentine footballer
- Leandro Alem (1841–1896), Argentine politician
- Leandro Marcolini Pedroso de Almeida (born 1982), Brazilian-Hungarian footballer
- Leandro Álvarez (born 1981), Argentine footballer
- Leandro Armani (born 1983), Argentine footballer
- Leandro Augusto (born 1977), Brazilian footballer
- Leandro Lessa Azevedo (born 1980), Brazilian footballer
- Leandro Baccaro (born 1973), Argentine field hockey player
- Leandro Barbosa (born 1982), Brazilian basketball player
- Leandro Barrera (born 1991), Argentine footballer
- Leandro Bassano (1557–1622), Italian artist
- Leandro Bazán (born 1990), Argentine footballer
- Leandro Becerra (born 1984), Argentine footballer
- Leandro Benegas (born 1988), Argentine footballer
- Leandro Benítez (born 1981), Argentine footballer
- Leandro Blanc (born 1993), Argentine boxer
- Leandro Bolmaro (born 2000), Argentine basketball player
- Leandro Bottasso (born 1986), Argentine track and road cyclist
- Leandro Brey (born 2002), Argentine footballer
- Leandro Caballero (born 1986), Argentine footballer
- Leandro Campagna (born 1994), Italian footballer
- Leandro Caruso (born 1982), Argentine footballer
- Leandro Cedaro (born 1988), Argentine rugby union player
- Leandro Cedeño (born 1998), Venezuelan baseball player
- Leandro Chaparro (born 1991), Argentine footballer
- Leandro Chichizola (born 1990), Argentine footballer
- Leandro Collavini (born 1985), Argentine footballer
- Leandro Contín (born 1995), Argentine footballer
- Leandro Coronel (born 1988), Argentine footballer
- Leandro Cufré (born 1978), Argentine footballer
- Leandro Cuomo (born 1996), Argentine footballer
- Leandro Cuzzolino (born 1987), Argentine futsal player
- Leandro Damião (born 1989), Brazilian footballer
- Leandro De Bortoli (born 1988), Argentine footballer
- Leandro De Muner (born 1983), Argentine footballer
- Leandro Depetris (born 1988), Argentine footballer
- Leandro Desábato (born 1979), Argentine footballer
- Leandro Desábato (footballer, born 1990), Argentine footballer
- Leandro Despouy (1947–2019), Argentine human rights lawyer
- Leandro de Deus Santos (born 1977), Brazilian footballer
- Leandro Díaz (footballer, born 1986), Argentine footballer
- Leandro Díaz (footballer, born 1992), Argentine footballer
- Leandro Domingues (1983–2025), Brazilian footballer
- Leandro Manuel Emede (born 1980), Argentine film editor and director
- Leandro Erlich (born 1973), Argentine artist
- Leandro Estebecorena, Argentine special effects technician
- Leandro Fernández (footballer, born 1983), Argentine footballer
- Leandro Fernández (footballer, born 1991), Argentine footballer
- Leandro Fernández (footballer, born 1995), Argentine footballer
- Leandro Fernández (artist) (born 1973), Argentine comic book artist
- Leandro Fleitas (born 1983), Argentine footballer
- Leandro Garate (born 1993), Argentine footballer
- Leandro Gioda (born 1984), Argentine footballer
- Leandro Godoy (born 1994), Argentine footballer
- Leandro Gomes (born 1976), Azerbaijani footballer
- Leandro González (born 1985), Argentine footballer
- Leandro González Pírez (born 1992), Argentine footballer
- Leandro Gracián (born 1982), Argentine footballer
- Leandro Grech (born 1980), Argentine footballer
- Leandro Grimi (born 1985), Argentine footballer
- Leandro Guaita (born 1986), Argentine footballer
- Leandro Guzmán (born 1989), Argentine footballer
- Leandro Joaquim Ribeiro (born 1995), Brazilian footballer
- Leandro Katz (born 1938), Argentine writer
- Leandro Krysa (born 1992), Argentine chess player
- Leandro Kuszko (born 1990), Argentine footballer
- Leandro Lacunza (born 1997), Argentine footballer
- Leandro Lázzaro (born 1974), Argentine footballer
- Leandro Ledesma (born 1987), Argentine footballer
- Leandro Leguizamón (born 1988), Argentine footballer
- Leandro Lencinas (born 1995), Argentine footballer
- Leandro Lo (1989–2022), Brazilian jiu-jitsu black belt
- Leandro Locsin (1928–1994), Filipino architect and artist
- Leandro Lugarzo (born 1990), Argentine footballer
- Leandro Maciel (born 1995), Argentine footballer
- Leandro Maly (born 1976), Argentine volleyball player
- Leandro Marchetti (born 1974), Argentine fencer
- Leandro Mamut (born 2003), Argentine footballer
- Leandro Marín (born 1992), Argentine footballer
- Leandro Antonio Martínez (born 1989), Argentine footballer
- Leandro Emmanuel Martínez (born 1994), Argentine footballer
- Leandro Martini (born 1974), Argentine footballer
- Leandro Mathias (born 2004), Brazilian football goalkeeper
- Leandro Mercado (born 1992), Argentine motorcycle racer
- Leandro Messineo (born 1979), Argentine cyclist
- Leandro Martínez Montagnoli (born 1987), Argentine footballer
- Leandro Moldes (born 1986), Swiss singer
- Leandro Montagud (born 1989), Spanish footballer
- Leandro Fernández de Moratín (1760–1828), Spanish dramatist
- Leandro Navarro (born 1992), Argentine footballer
- Leandro de Oliveira da Luz (born 1983), Brazilian footballer
- Leandro Palladino (January 1976), Argentine basketball player
- Leandro Paredes (born 1994), Argentine footballer
- Leandro Paris (born 1995), Argentine runner
- Leandro Pinto Bernardo (born 2003), Brazilian footballer
- Leandro Requena (born 1987), Argentine footballer
- Leandro Romagnoli (born 1981), Argentine footballer
- Leandro Romano (born 1997), Argentine footballer
- Leandro Romiglio (born 1991), Argentine squash player
- Leandro Ruiz Machado (born 1977), Brazilian water polo player
- Leandro Santoro (born 1976), Argentine politician
- Leandro dos Santos (born 1986), Brazilian footballer
- Leandro Sapetti (born 1989), Argentine footballer
- Leandro Scartascini (born 1985), Argentine footballer
- Leandro da Silva (disambiguation), multiple people
- Leandro Somoza (born 1981), Argentine footballer
- Leandro Stillitano (born 1983), Argentine footballer
- Leandro Taub (born 1981), Argentine actor and author
- Leandro Teijo (born 1991), Argentine footballer
- Leandro Testa (born 1976), Argentine footballer
- Leandro Tolini (born 1990), Argentine field hockey player
- Leandro Torres (born 1988), Argentine footballer
- Leandro Trossard (born 1994), Belgian footballer
- Leandro Usuna (born 1987), Argentine surfer
- Leandro Velázquez (born 1989), Argentine footballer
- Leandro Vella (born 1996), Argentine footballer
- Leandro Verì (1903–1938), Italian carabiniere
- Leandro Viotto (born 1985), Argentine entrepreneur
- Leandro Zárate (born 1984), Argentine footballer
- Leandro Zdero (born 1971), Argentine politician

== Italian variant ==
- Aleandro (Tuscan form)
