= Leander =

Leander is one of the protagonists in the story of Hero and Leander in Greek mythology.

Leander may also refer to:

== People ==
- Leander (given name)
- Leander (surname)

== Places ==
- Leander, Kentucky, United States, an unincorporated community
- Leander, Louisiana, United States, an unincorporated community
- Leander, Texas, United States, a city
  - Leander station, a Capital MetroRail commuter rail station
- Leander, West Virginia, United States, an unincorporated community
- Leander Glacier, Admiralty Mountains, Antarctica

== Ships ==
- HMS Leander, several Royal Navy ships
- Leander class (disambiguation), three ship classes
- HMNZS Leander, a Royal New Zealand Navy light cruiser of World War II, originally HMS Leander of the British Royal Navy
- Leander (ship), several ships

== Other uses ==
- Leander Independent School District, Texas
  - Leander High School
- Leander (video game), a 1991 video game
- Leander Club, one of the oldest rowing clubs in the world, based in Henley-on-Thames, England
- LMS Jubilee Class 5690 Leander, a preserved steam locomotive
- Leander (crustacean), a genus of shrimps
- Nottingham Leander Swimming Club
