= Léandre =

Léandre is both a given name and a surname. Notable people with the name include:

== Given name ==
- Antoine Léandre Sardou (1803–1881), French philologist
- Didier Léandre Tsiajotso, Malagasy politician
- Léandre Dumouchel (1811–1882), Quebec doctor and political figure
- Léandre Griffit (born 1984), French professional footballer
- Léandre Lacroix (1859–1935), Luxembourgian politician and jurist
- Léandre Thibault (1899–1971), Liberal party member of the Canadian House of Commons
- Pierre-Léandre Marcotte (1837–1899), farmer and political figure in Quebec

== Surname ==
- Charles Lucien Léandre (1862–1934), French caricaturist and painter
- Joëlle Léandre (born 1951), double bassist, vocalist, and composer
- Léon Compère-Léandre (1874–1936), shoemaker in Saint-Pierre on the French Caribbean island of Martinique

== See also ==
- Hero and Leander, Greek myth
- Saint Leander of Seville, Catholic Bishop of Seville
- Saint-Léandre, Quebec, parish municipality in the Canadian province of Quebec
- Leander (disambiguation)
- Leandro (given name)
- Leandra
