= Leandro Alves =

Leandro Alves may refer to:

== Footballers ==
- Leandro Alves (footballer, born 1980), Leandro Alvés da Cunha, Brazilian forward
- Leandro Alves (footballer, born 1982), Leandro Alves Pereira, Brazilian forward
- Geo Alves (Leandro Geovanny Mendes Alves, born 1995), Cape Verdean–American footballer in the Major Arena Soccer League

== Other ==
- Leandro Maria Alves (born 1974), East Timorese bishop

== See also ==
- Leandro (disambiguation)
