= Leandra (disambiguation) =

Leandra is a genus of plant in the family Melastomataceae.

Leandra may also refer to:

- Leandra, Mpumalanga, a settlement in Gert Sibande District Municipality in the Mpumalanga province of South Africa

The given name Leandra may refer to:

- Leandra (given name)
- Leandra Columberg, a Swiss politician
- Leandra Leal, a Brazilian actress
- Leandra Medine, an American author and blogger
- Leandra Ramm, an American singer-songwriter and actress

In fiction

- Leandra - a character in Don Quixote by Miguel de Cervantes. She is a beautiful woman with many suitors, and when she chooses one her father disapproves and so he retires her to a convent. All her suitors withdraw to the mountains where they become shepherds and goat-herders so that they can spend their days writing songs and poems about how beautiful she is.

== See also ==
- Leander (disambiguation)
- Leandro (disambiguation)
