= 1934 Hillman's Airways de Havilland Dragon Rapide crash =

1934 plane crash in the English Channel

Coordinates: 51°1′37″N 1°13′48″E

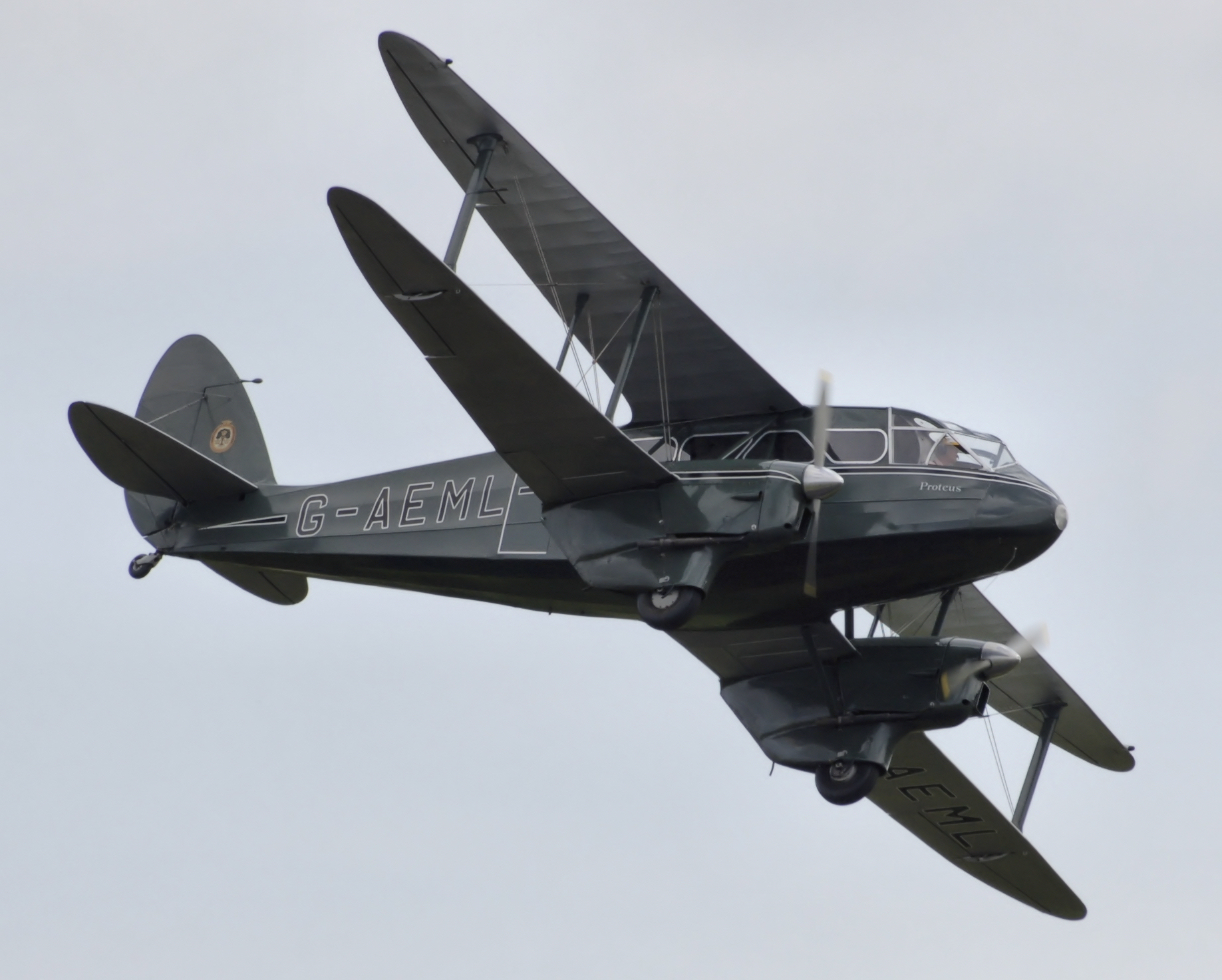
- A de Havilland DH.89A Dragon Rapide, similar to the accident aircraft.

Accident
- Date: 2 October 1934
- Summary: CFIT (pilot error)
- Site: English Channel, 4 miles (6 km) off Folkestone

Aircraft
- Aircraft type: De Havilland DH. 89A Dragon Rapide
- Operator: Hillman's Airways
- Registration: G-ACPM
- Flight origin: Abridge Aerodrome, Essex, United Kingdom
- Destination: Le Bourget, Paris, France
- Passengers: 6
- Crew: 1
- Fatalities: 7
- Survivors: 0

The 1934 Hillman's Airways de Havilland Dragon Rapide crash occurred on 2 October 1934 when a de Havilland DH.89A Dragon Rapide of Hillman's Airways crashed into the English Channel off Folkestone, Kent, killing all seven people on board. The aircraft was operating an international scheduled passenger flight from Abridge Aerodrome to Le Bourget Airport, Paris. The accident resulted in the first write-off of a Dragon Rapide.

== Aircraft ==
The accident aircraft was de Havilland DH.89A Dragon Rapide G-ACPM, c/n 6251. This aircraft was the first production Dragon Rapide. The aircraft had been entered in the 1934 King's Cup Race by Lord Wakefield but withdrew at Waddington following hail damage. It had been delivered to Hillman's Airways on 27 July.

== Accident ==
The flight had departed Abridge at 10 am. Cloudbase was 700 feet (210 m) and visibility was 2 miles (3 km) but decreased in rain within half an hour of the aircraft's departure. At 10.47, the aircraft was approaching the coast and the pilot asked Croydon for a radio bearing. The bearing received placed him north of Dover. The normal route in conditions of bad visibility was from Dungeness to Le Touquet. The pilot turned south to regain his course. At about 11:02, the aircraft dived into the sea and was destroyed, killing all seven people on board.

The location of the accident was 4 miles (6.4 km) off Folkestone. The crash was heard by the crew of the German SS Leander. A boat was lowered and some wreckage and two bodies were discovered within ten minutes. Visibility at the time was poor in patchy rain with a cloudbase of 300 feet (91 m) The British coaster SS Snowcrete joined the search. Its boat recovered a third body. The Southern Railway's cross-channel ferry SS Biarritz also joined the search. Two more bodies were recovered. The victims were transferred to Biarritz which took them to Folkestone before resuming her voyage to Boulogne. The Dover Lifeboat and a tug from Dover searched for the remaining two victims. Wreckage from the aircraft was landed at Dover and Folkestone. The accident resulted in the first write-off of a Dragon Rapide.

The inquest into the deaths of the five people whose bodies had been recovered was opened by the Folkestone Coroner at Folkestone Town Hall on 4 October. Evidence was given that the aircraft had probably crashed into the sea at high speed and all victims had died from multiple injuries. A verdict of "accidental death" was returned on all five victims.

An Air Ministry investigation determined the cause of the accident to be pilot error due to the pilot's lack of experience in navigation and blind flying. Although conditions lower down were extremely poor, there was little cloud between 3,000 and 8,000 ft (910 and 2,440 m). The sea was calm and the pilot was unable to distinguish its surface.

== Casualties ==
The nationalities of the victims were:

Nationality	Crew	Passengers	Total
English	1	2	3
French	–	2	2
American	–	1	1
Scottish	–	1	1
Total	1	6	7
