= Leander (ship) =

Several vessels have been named Leander for one the protagonists in the story of Hero and Leander in Greek mythology.

- Leander was launched in 1795 at North Shields. The Royal Navy purchased her in 1797, converted her to a bomb-vessel, and renamed her HMS Strombolo. She participated in the capture of Malta in 1800. The Navy laid her up in 1802 and had her broken up in 1809.
- Leander (1799 ship) was a slave ship launched on the Thames and captured in 1801.
- Leander was a ship built in 1799 which was sold to Russia in 1802, and was renamed Nadezhda
- Leander was launched by Simon Temple, South Shields in 1800. The Royal Navy purchased her in 1803 and named her HMS Curlew. Curlew was a sloop of 16 guns. The Navy sold her in 1810 and she returned to mercantile service as Leander. On her first voyage to the West Indies a French privateer captured her in a single-ship action; she was lost shortly thereafter.
- Leander (1813 ship) was launched at Whitehaven. Initially she traded as a West Indiaman and then more widely. She was wrecked in July 1822 at the Cape of Good Hope.
- Leander (clipper) – a clipper built in 1867
- SS Leander (1883), in service with Neptun Line, Bremen, Germany until 1917
- SS Leander (1925), in service with Neptun Line until 1939
- Leander G, a modern cruising superyacht

== See also ==
- HMS Leander, various Royal Navy ships
- Leander class (disambiguation), three ship classes
- HMNZS Leander, a Royal New Zealand Navy light cruiser of World War II, originally HMS Leander of the British Royal Navy
