= Leandra (given name) =

- Gender: Feminine

Origin
- Meaning: lioness

Other names
- Related names: Leander, Leandro

Leandra is a feminine form of the Greek name Leander. It is in use in Italian, Portuguese and Spanish and was among the top 10 most popular names for newborn girls in Albania in recent years.
