= Leandro =

Leandro may refer to:

- Ero e Leandro, a 1707 cantata by George Frideric Handel
- Leandro (given name), a male name, including a list of people with the name
- Leandro v. North Carolina, legal case in North Carolina, United States
- San Leandro, California
- San Leandro Creek

== See also ==
- Leandra (disambiguation)
