= Moldes (surname) =

Moldes is a surname. Notable people with the surname include:

- José Moldes (1785–1824), Argentine military leader
- Leandro Moldes (born 1986), Swiss singer
