= Hero and Leander (Etty) =

Painting by William Etty

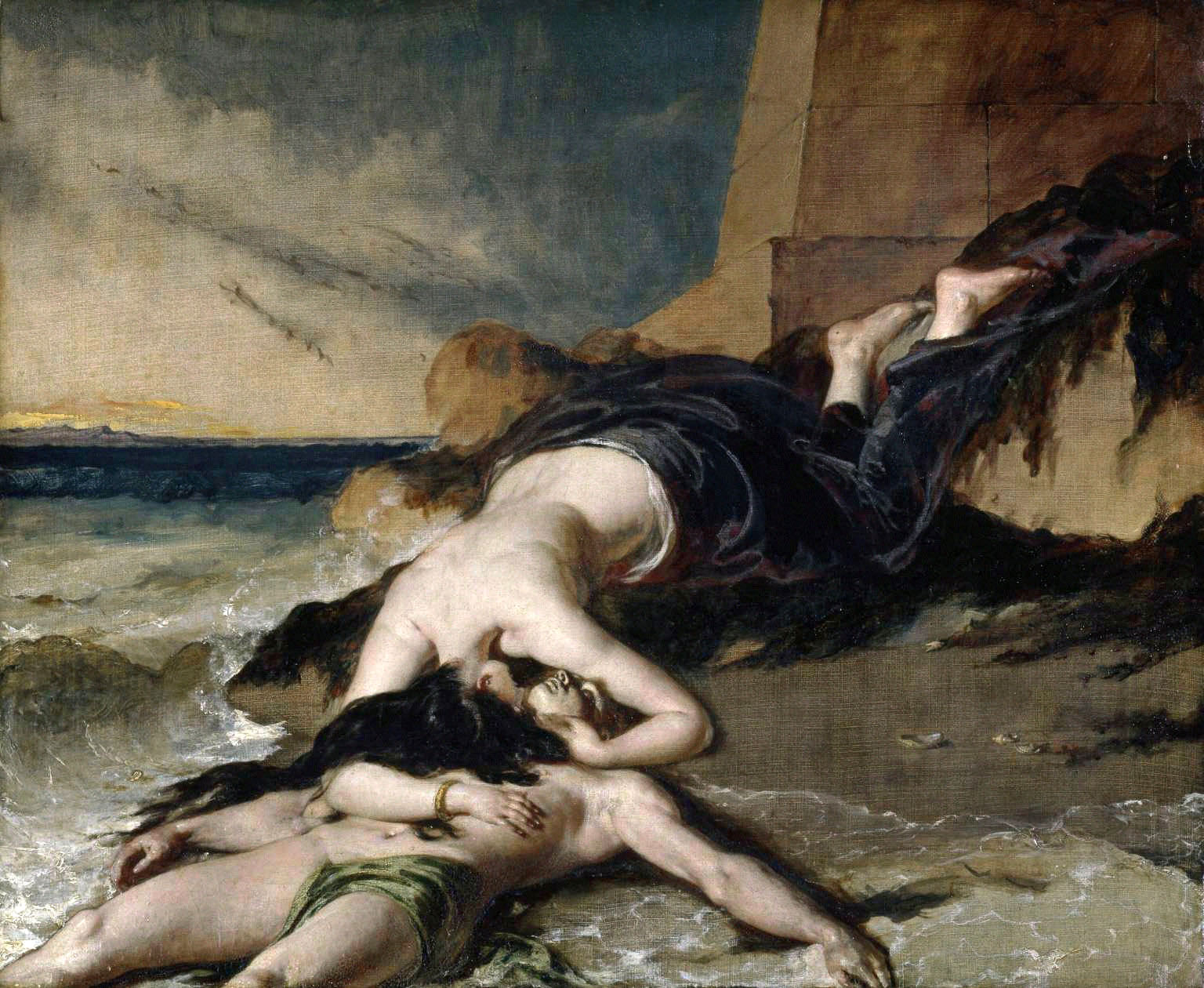
- Artist: William Etty
- Year: 1829
- Type: Oil on canvas, history painting
- Dimensions: 75 cm × 92.5 cm (30 in × 36.4 in)
- Location: Tate Britain, London

Hero, Having Thrown Herself from the Tower at the Sight of Leander Drowned, Dies on his Body, known by the shorter title Hero and Leander, is an 1829 oil painting by the British artist William Etty, combining elements of history painting and nude art. It depicts the tragic story of the young lovers Hero and Leander from Greek Mythology.

The work was displayed at the Royal Academy Exhibition of 1829 at Somerset House in London. Today it is in the collection of the Tate Britain in Pimlico, having been received in 2006.

== See also ==
- The Parting of Hero and Leander, an 1837 painting by J.M.W. Turner

== Bibliography ==
- Robinson, Leonard. William Etty: The Life and Art. McFarland, 2007.
