= Hero and Leander (1819 poem) =

1819 poem by Leigh Hunt

Hero and Leander is a poem by Leigh Hunt written and published in 1819. The result of three years of work, the poem tells the Greek myth of Hero and Leander, two lovers, and the story of their forlorn fate. Hunt began working on the poem during the summer of 1816, arousing the interest of the publisher John Taylor, and despite repeated delays to allow Hunt to deal with other commitments the poem was finished and published in a collection 1819. Dealing with themes of love and its attempt to conquer nature, the poem does not contain the political message that many of Hunt's works around that time do. The collection was well received by contemporary critics, who remarked on its sentiment and delicacy, while more modern writers such as Edmund Blunden have criticised the flow of its narrative.

== Background ==
After the decline in circulation for his paper the Examiner following Napoleon's defeat at Waterloo, Hunt began to focus more on his poetry. During this time, he decided to write poems about the story of Hero and Leander along with the story of Bacchus and Ariadne. After starting on the poem about Hero and Leander during summer 1816, Hunt showed the lines to the publisher John Taylor who gave Hunt 20 guineas as a partial payment for a collection including the poem.

A notice by Taylor and Hessey was sent to Hunt on 22 February 1817 asking about Hero and Leander. Percy Bysshe Shelley responded for Hunt to gain more time for Hunt to complete the volume. In June, Hunt devoted his time to work on the second edition of The Story of the Remini while hoping to finish the collection during winter 1818. However, the projected date was pushed back by the end of 1818. By July 1819, the poem, along with Bacchus and Ariadne, The Panther were finished and soon published.

== Poem ==
The poem tells the story of Hero and Leander in medias res and lacks context to the story. The poem begins with a description of worshipping Venus, the Greek goddess of love, and the celebration of the physical world:

The hour of worship's over; and the flute
And choral voices of the girls are mute;
And by degrees the people have departed
Homeward, with gentle step, and quiet-hearted;
The jealous easy, the desponding healed;
The timid, hopeful of their love concealed;
The sprightlier maiden, sure of nuptial joys;
And mothers, grateful for their rosy boys. (lines 1–8)

The poem explains what happens to material pleasure along with the connection between love and emotion. This leads back into the story of Leander's death:

And thus it is, that happiest linked loves
Glance and are gone sometimes, like passing doves;
Or like two dancers gliding from a green;
Or two sky-streaks, filling with clouds between,
All we can hope is, that so sweet a smile
Goes somewhere to continue; and meanwhile,
Hopes, joys, and sorrows link our days together,
Like spring, and summer-time, and wintery weather.
For autumn now was over; and the crane
Began to clang against the coming rain.
And peevish winds ran cutting o'er the sea,
Which at its best looked dark and slatily. (lines 193–204)

The poem removes any emphasis on idyllic nature to describe the sublime:

Meantime the sun had sunk; the hilly mark,
A-cross the straits, mixed with the mightier dark.
And night came on. All noises by degrees
Were hushed, — the fisher's call, the birds, the trees.
All but the washing of the eternal seas.
Hero looked out, and trembling augured ill.
The darkness held its breath so very still. (lines 223–229)

The poem describes how love allows Leander to swim the Hellespont to meet with Hero:

He thinks it comes! Ah, yes,—'tis she! 'tis she!
Again he springs; and though the winds arise
Fiercer and fiercer, swims with ardent eyes;
And always, though with ruffian waves dashed hard.
Turns thither with glad groan his stout regard;
And always, though his sense seems washed away.
Emerges, fighting tow'rds the cordial ray. (lines 248–254)

Leander, as he dies, keeps changing between thoughts of the divine and thoughts about the human world:

Then dreadful thoughts of death, of waves heaped on him.
And friends, and parting daylight, rush upon him.
He thinks of prayers to Neptune and his daughters.
And Venus, Hero's queen, sprung from the waters;
And then of Hero only,—how she fares.
And what she'll feel, when the blank morn appears;
And at that thought he stiffens once again
His limbs, and pants, and strains, and climbs,—in vain.
Fierce draughts he swallows of the wilful wave. (lines 261–269)

Eventually, Leander appears drowned. In the end, Hero kills herself and there is no metamorphosis as found in other versions of the story:

She went up to the tower, and straining out
To search the seas, downwards, and round about,
She saw, at last,—she saw her lord indeed
Floating, and washed about, like a vile weed;
On which such strength of passion and dismay
Seized her, and such an impotence to stay.
That from the turret, like a stricken dove.
With fluttering arms she leaped, and joined her drowned love. (lines 286–293)

== Themes ==
The story describes love and its attempt to conquer nature, but it also describes a forlorn fate. While many of the other works written by Hunt during the time had political themes that expressed his feelings about the actions of the British government, Hero and Leander was toned down and contained a "sociability" that was mentioned in the preface of Hunt's Foliage. When placed into a sequence with Bacchus and Ariadne, the latter story is a consolation to the themes of the first. The focus on death shows a switch between mourning along with a sort of blankness, which is similar to how Alfred Lord Tennyson approaches death in In Memoriam.

In The Religion of the Heart, Hunt argued that "It was a great mistake of the nurturers of Christianity to preach contempt of the body, out of a notion of exalting the soul." Hunt, in the Indicator essay, wrote in response to the views expressed in William Wordsworth's "The World is Too Much With Us": "It was a strong sense of this, which made a living poet, who is accounted very orthodox in his religious opinions, give vent, in that fine sonnet, to his impatience at seeing the beautiful planet we live upon, with all its starry wonders about it, so little thought of, compared with what is so ridiculously called the world." This view of "the world" is the same as in Hero and Leander as morality is said to limit material pleasure. Hunt also reverses the idea that pleasures are fleeting and should be rejected to claim that pleasures are fleeting because they are rejected by the world.

In terms of religion, Hunt returns to a mythological theme because, as he argues in The Indicator essay "Spirit of the Ancient Mythology", "Imagine Plutarch, a devout and yet a liberal believer, when he went to study theology and philosophy at Delphi: with what feelings must he have passed along the woody paths to the hill, approaching nearer every instant to the divinity, and not sure that a glance of light through the trees was not the lustre of the god himself going by! This is mere poetry to us, and very fine it is; but to him it was poetry, and religion, and beauty, and gravity, and hushing awe, and a path as from one world to another." This reality appears in the beginning of the poem with its emphasis on the temple to Venus. Hunt's approach to the service is similar to a traditional Anglican evensong. Hunt seeks to recreate the Classical religion as it was and wants to move myth beyond just simple poetry and into the realm of religion.

== Critical response ==
The collection containing Hero and Leander was well received by contemporary critics with the London Magazine devoted a lengthy analysis to the works. Bulwer-Lytton, in an 1832 review, claimed the poem revealed a poet that was like "Dryden himself, but ... with a sentiment, a delicacy, not his own."

Edmund Blunden, in 1930, claims that the poems were "unequally written narratives". Nicolas Roe argues that "Hunt's couplets can create sudden surges of energy [...] and, elsewhere in the poem, they prolong the moment when dawn slowly reveals Leanders drowned body".

Although praising many of the beginning lines of the poem, Rodney Edgecombe claims, "Good though that is, the verse from this point onwards lacks distinction; Hunt's material has deprived him of the sort of stimuli to which his imagination ordinarily responds—he is never at home with sublimity and terror."
