= The Parting of Hero and Leander =

Painting by J. M. W. Turner

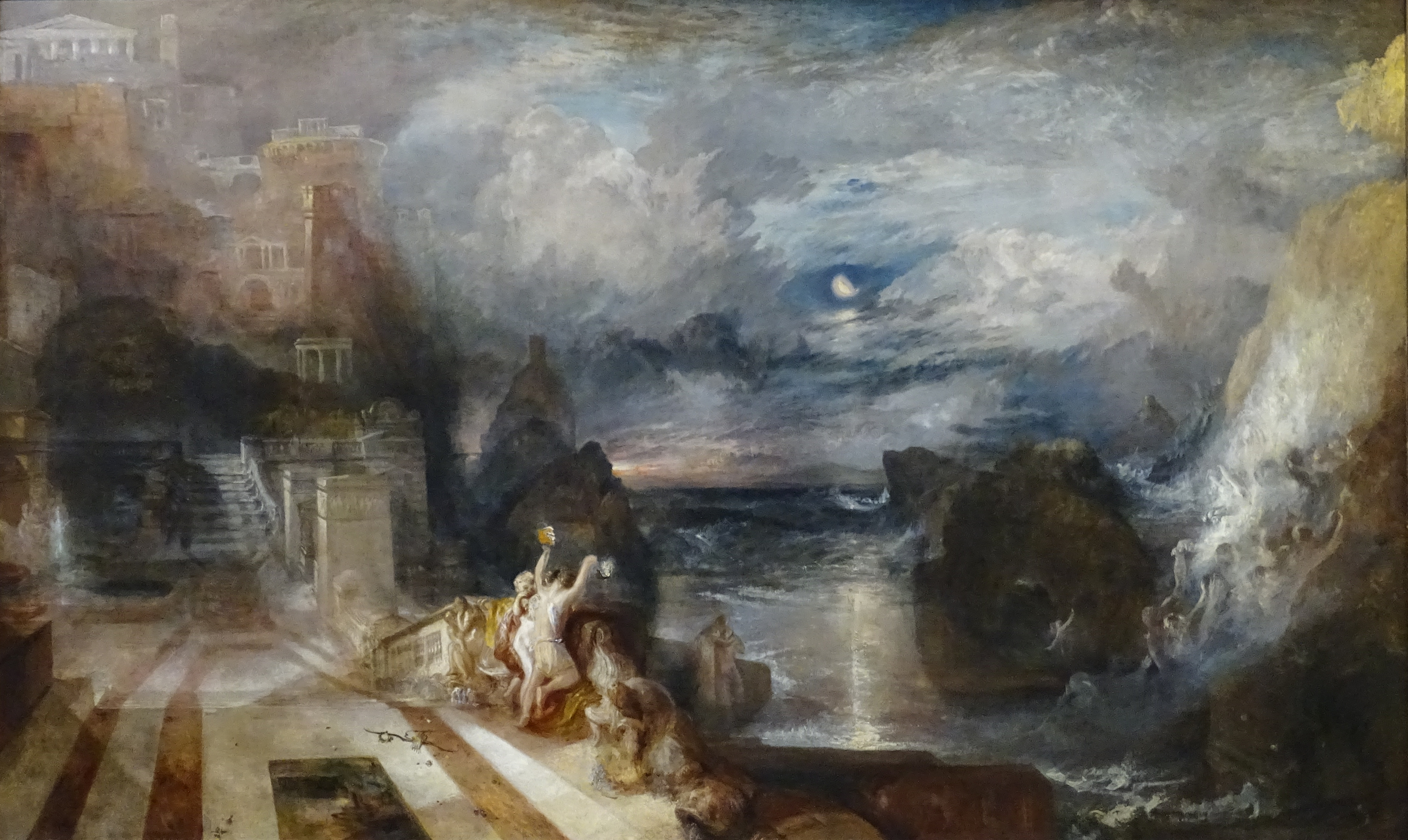
- Artist: J. M. W. Turner
- Year: 1837
- Type: Oil on canvas, history painting
- Dimensions: 146 cm × 236 cm (57 in × 93 in)
- Location: National Gallery, London

The Parting of Hero and Leander is an 1837 history painting the British artist J.M.W. Turner. It depicts a scene based on the tragic story of Hero and Leander from Greek Mythology. Turner breaks with the traditional conventions of history painting and depicts the protagonists as small figures in a wider painting. Although Turner had shown an interest in the story in sketches he had made thirty five years earlier the impetus for this work likely came from Lord Byron's poem The Bride of Abydos and William Etty's painting depicting it.

The painting was displayed at the Royal Academy Exhibition of 1837 in London under title title The Parting of Hero and Leander - from the Greek of Musaeus. It formed part of the Turner Bequest of 1856 and is now in the collection of the National Gallery.

== See also ==
- Hero and Leander, an 1829 painting by William Etty
- List of paintings by J. M. W. Turner

== Bibliography ==
- Charlesworth, Michael. Landscape and Vision in Nineteenth-Century Britain and France. Taylor & Francis, 2017.
- Herrmann, Luke. Nineteenth Century British Painting,. Charles de la Mare, 2000.
- Reynolds, Graham. Turner. Thames & Hudson, 2022.
