= Leandro Scartascini =

Argentine footballer

Personal information
- Full name: Leandro Maximiliano Scartascini
- Date of birth: January 30, 1985 (age 41)
- Place of birth: Buenos Aires, Argentina
- Height: 1.85 m (6 ft 1 in)
- Position: Striker

Youth career
- Club Atlético Lanús

Senior career*
Years	Team	Apps	(Gls)
2002–2003	Manfredonia	?	(?)
2003–2004	Darlington F.C.	1	(0)
2004–2005	Apullum	16	(3)
2005	Bolívar	12	(1)
2006	Örebro SK	?	(?)
2007	UD Alzira	1	(0)
- * Club domestic league appearances and goals as of March 2008

Leandro Maximiliano Scartascini (born 30 January 1985 in Adrogué, Argentina) is an Argentine football player He operates either in an attacking midfield position or as a striker.

== Career ==
During 2004 Darlington F.C. boss David Hodgson saw a window of opportunity to transfer Scartascini on the recommendation of a South American contact. Leandro, 19 at the time, joined Darlington on trial for the rest of the season however his fate was sealed when the club were unable to obtain the funds to house the young starlet during his stay in England.

Since 2005 he has played football for Apullum in Romania, Bolívar in Bolivia, Örebro SK in Sweden and UD Alzira in Spain.
