= Antoine Léandre Sardou =

French philologist (1803–1894)

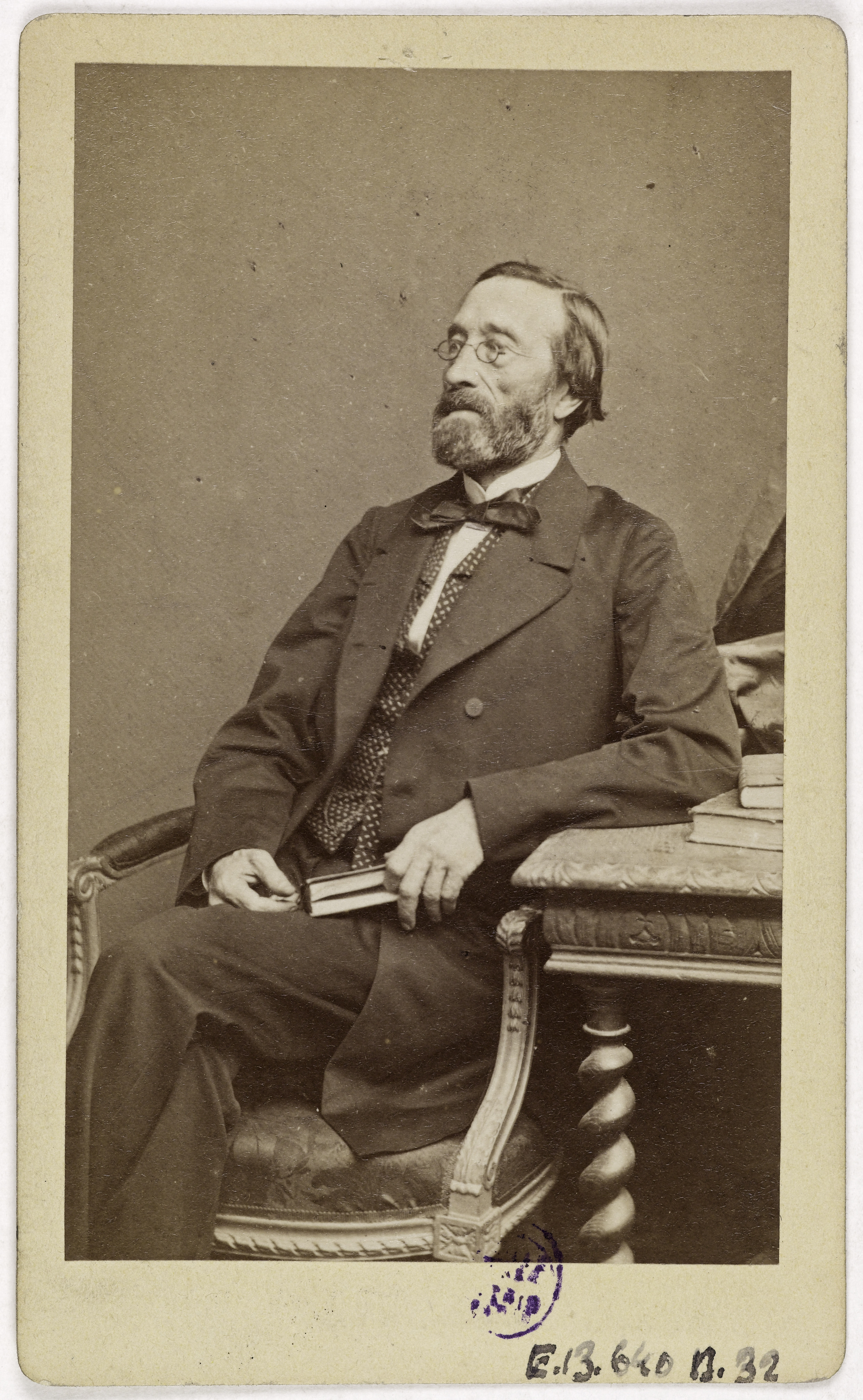
Antoine Léandre Sardou

Antoine Léandre Sardou (1803–1894) was a French philologist, a member of the Société des lettres, sciences et arts des Alpes-Maritimes, and the father of dramatist Victorien Sardou.

== Selected works ==
- L'idiome niçois: ses origines, son passé, son état present (in French). Malvano. 1878.
