= Leander (surname) =

Leander is a surname. Notable people with the surname include:

- Anna Leander, Danish sociologist and political scientist
- Börje Leander (1918–2003), Swedish footballer
- Helena Leander (born 1982), Swedish politician
- Kathy Leander, Swiss singer
- Mike Leander (1941–1996), English arranger and record producer for Decca Records
- Richard Leander, pseudonym of Richard von Volkmann (1830–1889), German surgeon and poet
- Zarah Leander (1907–1981), Swedish actress

== See also ==
- Leander (given name)
