= Leandro (footballer, born 2004) =

Brazilian footballer (born 2004)

Personal information
- Full name: Leandro Mathias Silva Bueno
- Date of birth: 14 November 2004 (age 21)
- Place of birth: Campinas, Brazil
- Height: 1.87 m (6 ft 2 in)
- Position: Goalkeeper

Team information
- Current team: Botafogo-PB
- Number: 21

Youth career
- 2018: Amparo
- 2019–2024: São Paulo

Senior career*
Years	Team	Apps	(Gls)
2023–2025	São Paulo	0	(0)
2026–	Botafogo-PB	2	(0)
- * Club domestic league appearances and goals as of 8 November 2026

Leandro Mathias Silva Bueno (born 14 November 2004), simply known as Leandro, is a Brazilian professional footballer who plays as a goalkeeper for Campeonato Brasileiro Série C club Botafogo-PB.

== Youth career ==
Goalkeeper revealed by Amparo Athlético Club, Leandro was hired for São Paulo's youth sectors in 2019. He has a great ability to take free kicks, having scored a goal against Penapolense in the 2022 Campeonato Paulista Sub-20 (U-20), which generates comparisons with the historic player Rogério Ceni. He played in the Copa São Paulo de Futebol Jr. in two editions, in 2023 in one match, and in 2024 during the entire campaign.

== Career ==
Leandro was listed as a substitute goalkeeper in some matches during the 2023 Campeonato Brasileiro Série A, and currently trains occasionally as the professional squad fourth goalkeeper. For the 2025 season, Leandro was fully integrated into the professional squad of São Paulo FC to carry out the club's pre-season in Florida, United States.

After remaining as an option for the 2025 season, his contract with São Paulo ended, and he subsequently signed with Botafogo-PB for 2026.

== Honours ==
Botafogo-PB

- Campeonato Paraibano: 2026
