= HMS Leander =

Six ships of the Royal Navy, have been named HMS Leander after the Greek hero Leander:

- HMS Leander (1780) was a 52-gun fourth rate launched in 1780. She was captured by the French in 1798, but was recaptured by the Russians in 1799 and returned. She was renamed HMS Hygeia in 1813 while being used as a medical depot, and was sold in 1817.
- HMS Leander (1813) was a 58-gun fourth rate launched in 1813 and broken up in 1830.
- HMS Leander (1848) was a 50-gun fourth rate launched in 1848. She was converted to screw propulsion in 1861 and was sold in 1867.
- HMS Leander (1882) was a Leander-class protected cruiser launched in 1882. She became a depot ship in 1904 and was sold in 1920.
- HMS Leander (1931) was a Leander-class light cruiser launched in 1931. She was transferred to the Royal New Zealand Navy in 1937, returned in 1945 and scrapped in 1949.
- HMS Leander (F109) was a Leander-class frigate launched in 1961 and expended as a target in 1989.

== Battle honours ==
Ships named Leander have earned the following battle honours:

- Nile 1798
- Algiers 1816
- Crimea 1854–55
- Kula Gulf 1943

== See also ==
- TS Leander, a New Zealand Sea Cadet Corps unit
- Leander (ship), a number of civil ships with this name
