= Aleandro =

Aleandro is both a surname and a given name. Notable people with the name include:

- Girolamo Aleandro (1480–1542), Italian cardinal
- Girolamo Aleandro (1574–1629), Italian scholar
- Girolamo Aleandro, the younger (1594–1629), Italian scholar
- Norma Aleandro (born 1936), Argentine actress, screenwriter and theatre director
- Pedro Aleandro (1910–1985), Argentine actor
- Aleandro Baldi (born 1959), Italian singer-songwriter and composer
- Aleandro Rosi (born 1987), Italian footballer
