= SS Leander (1925) =

German cargo ship

History
- Name: Leander (1925–1940); Empire Crusader (1940)
- Owner: Neptun Line (1925–1939); Ministry of War Transport (1939–1940)
- Operator: Neptun Line (1925–1939); unknown manager (1939–1940)
- Port of registry: (Weimar Republic) Bremen (1925–1933); (Nazi Germany) Bremen (1933–39); United Kingdom (1939–1940)
- Builder: Atlas Werke AG
- Launched: 1925
- Out of service: 8 August 1940
- Fate: Sank

General characteristics
- Type: Cargo ship
- Tonnage: 989 GRT (1925–1939); 1,042 GRT (1939–1940)
- Length: 224 ft (68 m)
- Beam: 33 ft (10 m)
- Depth: 13 ft 9 in (4.19 m)
- Propulsion: Triple expansion steam engine, single screw propeller
- Complement: 9, plus 6 DEMS gunners (Empire Crusader)

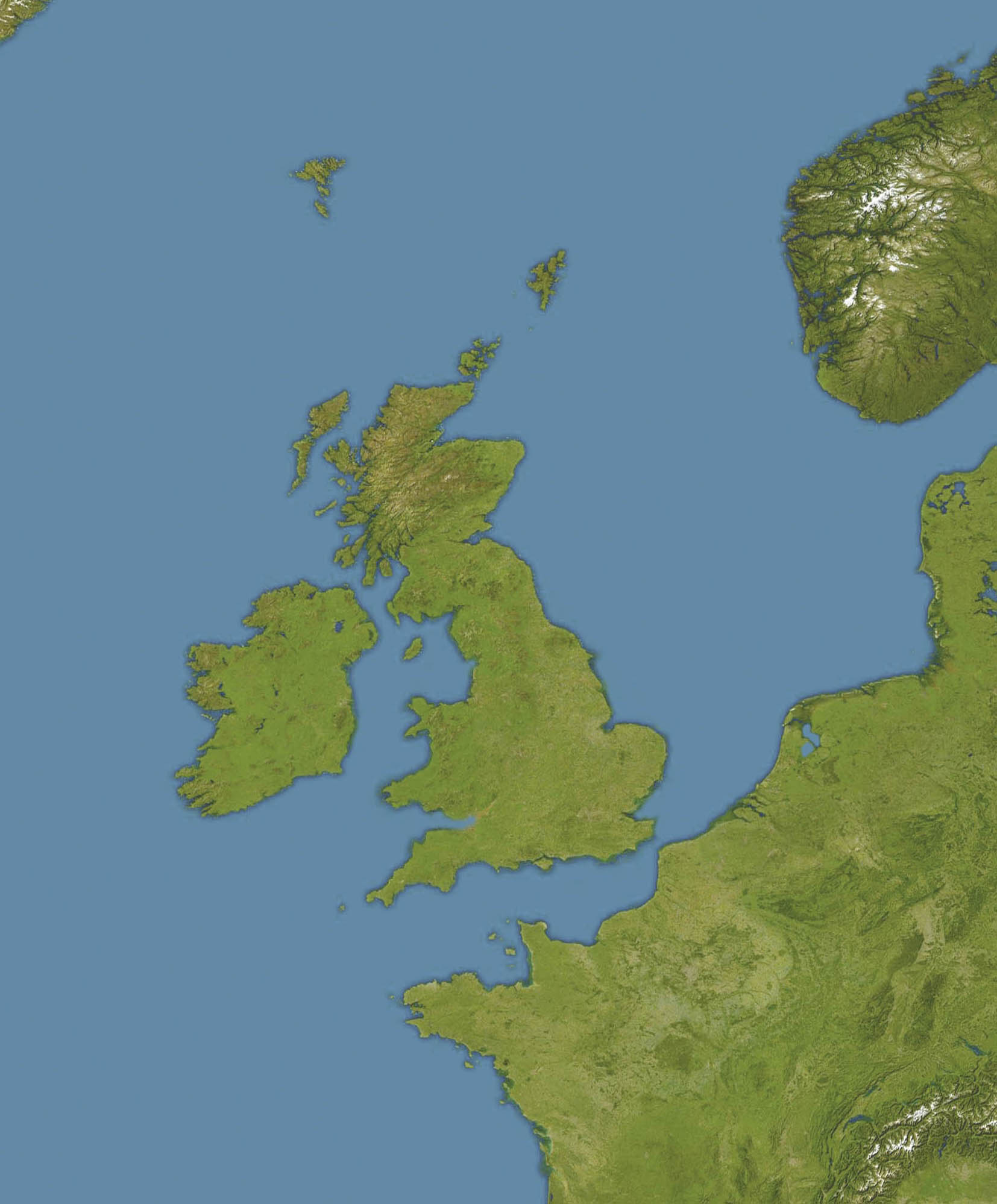
Location of the sinking of Empire Crusader.

Leander was a 989 GRT coaster that was built in 1925 by Atlas Werke AG, Hamburg, Germany. The British Royal Navy captured her in November 1939 and impressed her into service as Empire Crusader. She was bombed and sunk in 1940.

== Description ==
The ship was built in 1925 by Atlas Werke AG, Bremen.

The ship was 224 feet (68 m) long, with a beam of 33 feet (10 m). She had a depth of 13 feet 9 inches (4.19 m). She was assessed at 989 GRT.

The ship was propelled by a triple expansion steam engine.

== History ==
Leander was built for Neptun Line, Bremen. On 18 February 1931, she caught fire off Domesnaes, Latvia and was abandoned by her crew.

When World War II broke out, she was in port at Vigo, Spain. Unable to get food, she attempted to reach Germany disguised as a Soviet merchant ship. On 9 November the British destroyer HMS Isis captured her off Vigo. Her captain attempted to scuttle Leander, but was forcibly prevented from doing so by the rest of her crew. Leander was escorted into Falmouth, Cornwall, arriving on 13 November.

Leander was declared to be a prize of war. She was passed to the MoWT and renamed Empire Crusader. She was assessed as 1,042 GRT. She appears to have entered service for the British in March 1940. Empire Crusader sailed in British coastal waters, mostly between Plymouth, Devon and Seaham or Sunderland, County Durham.

On 7 August 1940, Empire Crusader departed from Southend, Essex as a member of Convoy CW 9, bound for the Yarmouth Roads. The next day, in the third aerial attack on the convoy, she was bombed by Junkers Ju 87s of Fliegerkorps VIII, StG 2, off St Catherine's Point, Isle of Wight in the Kanalkampf phase of the Battle of Britain. Her cargo of coal caught fire and the crew abandoned ship. Of her crew of nine, plus six DEMS gunners, four were killed. The ship capsized and sank at 50°25′52″N 1°42′16″W. Her Chief Engineer, James Cowper, was awarded an MBE, and Acting Able Seaman William Robson was commended, for their part in rescuing the ship's Second Mate.
