= Leandro Alves (footballer, born 1980) =

Brazilian footballer

Personal information
- Full name: Leandro Alvés da Cunha
- Date of birth: 30 November 1980 (age 45)
- Place of birth: Rio de Janeiro, Brazil
- Height: 1.66 m (5 ft 5 in)
- Position: Forward

Youth career
- –1995: Botafogo
- 1995–1998: Paris Saint-Germain

Senior career*
Years	Team	Apps	(Gls)
1998–1999	Paris Saint-Germain	0	(0)
1999–2000	U.D. Leiria		
2000–2001	Martina		
2001–2002	Boavista Sport Club		
2002–2003	FC Universitatea Craiova	3	(0)
2003–2004	Tupi		
2005	Barreira		
2005–2006	ASEC Mimosas		
2007	Macaé		
2007	Goytacaz		
2007–2008	FC AK		
2008–2009	Orlando Pirates S.C.		
2009–2010	Stade Tunisien	24	(5)
2011	Duque de Caxias		
2011	Boavista Sport Club		
- * Club domestic league appearances and goals

Leandro Alvés da Cunha (born 30 November 1980, in Rio de Janeiro) is a Brazilian former professional footballer who played as a forward.
