= Ero e Leandro =

Cantata by George Frideric Handel

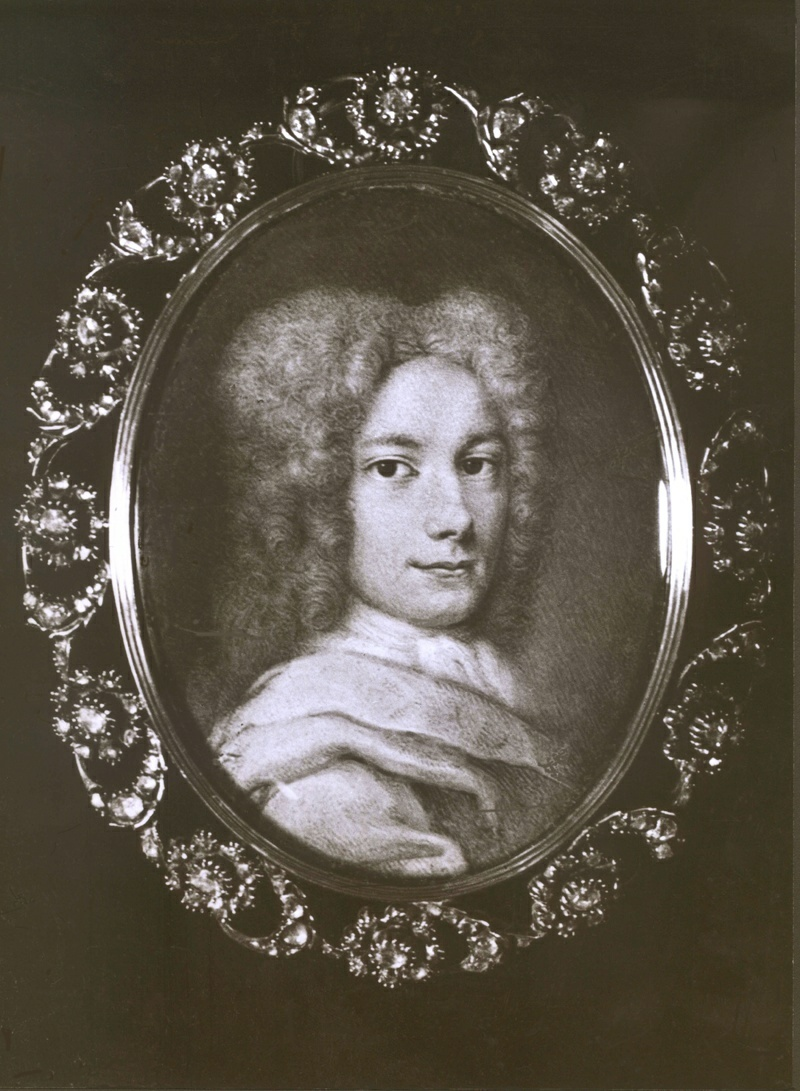
Händel c. 1710

Ero e Leandro, also known after its first line as Qual ti reveggio, oh Dio (HWV 150), is a 1707 Italian-language cantata by George Frideric Handel, composed during his stay in Rome to a libretto believed to be written by Cardinal Pietro Ottoboni. It is a reworking of the Greek myth of Hero and Leander, with the soprano soloist taking the role of Hero. In it, Hero finds her love, Leander, drowned, tears out her hair, thus symbolically rejecting the beauty which had led to Leander's fascination with her (and thus his death), then drowns herself. It is composed for a soprano solo (with no other singers), and a small orchestra consisting of two oboes, and two string sections: a concertino of solo violin and violoncello, and a concerto grosso made up of two violins, a viola, and continuo. In Ero e Leandro, Recitatives alternate with arias, as was normal at the period for not only cantatas, but oratorios and operas as well; however, unusually, Ero e Leandro ends with a recitative, instead of an aria.

Ero e Leandro comes from a period very early in Handel's career, when Handel, having travelled to Italy in 1706, was replacing his former Germanic style of composition with the Italian style that he would use for the rest of his life. Music from it would be reused by Handel in his later compositions: Themes taken from this opera appear in both Handel's Recorder Sonata Opus 1, No 2 and in his Utrecht Te Deum for the setting of "Vouchsafe, O Lord". In Agrippina, Agrippina's aria "Non ho che cor amarti" was taken, almost entirely unadapted, from "Se la morte non vorrà".

It is the only of Handel's cantatas known, to reasonable certainty, to have been written under the patronage of Cardinal Pietro Ottoboni, an important patron of the arts in Italy for whom Handel is known to have written many cantatas, but, outside of Ero e Leandro, it's somewhat uncertain which these are.

Ero e Leandro was first published in 1999 as part of Hallische Händel-Ausgabe's attempt to create a complete edition of all of Handel's works. It appears in Georg Friedrich Händel. Kantaten mit Instrumenten, III: HWV 150, 165, 166, 170, 171, 173.

== Music ==
- Qual ti reveggio, oh Dio (Recitative)
- Empio mare (Aria)
- Amor, che ascoso (Recitative)
- Se la morte non vorrà (Aria)
- Questi dalla mia fronte (Recitative)
- Si muora (Aria)
- Ecco, gelide labbra (Recitative)
