= Leander, West Virginia =

Unincorporated community in West Virginia, US

Coordinates: 38°11′28″N 81°00′29″W

Leander is an unincorporated community in Fayette County, in the U.S. state of West Virginia.

== History ==
The community was named in honor of Leander Brown, a businessperson in the railroad industry.
