= Leander (given name) =

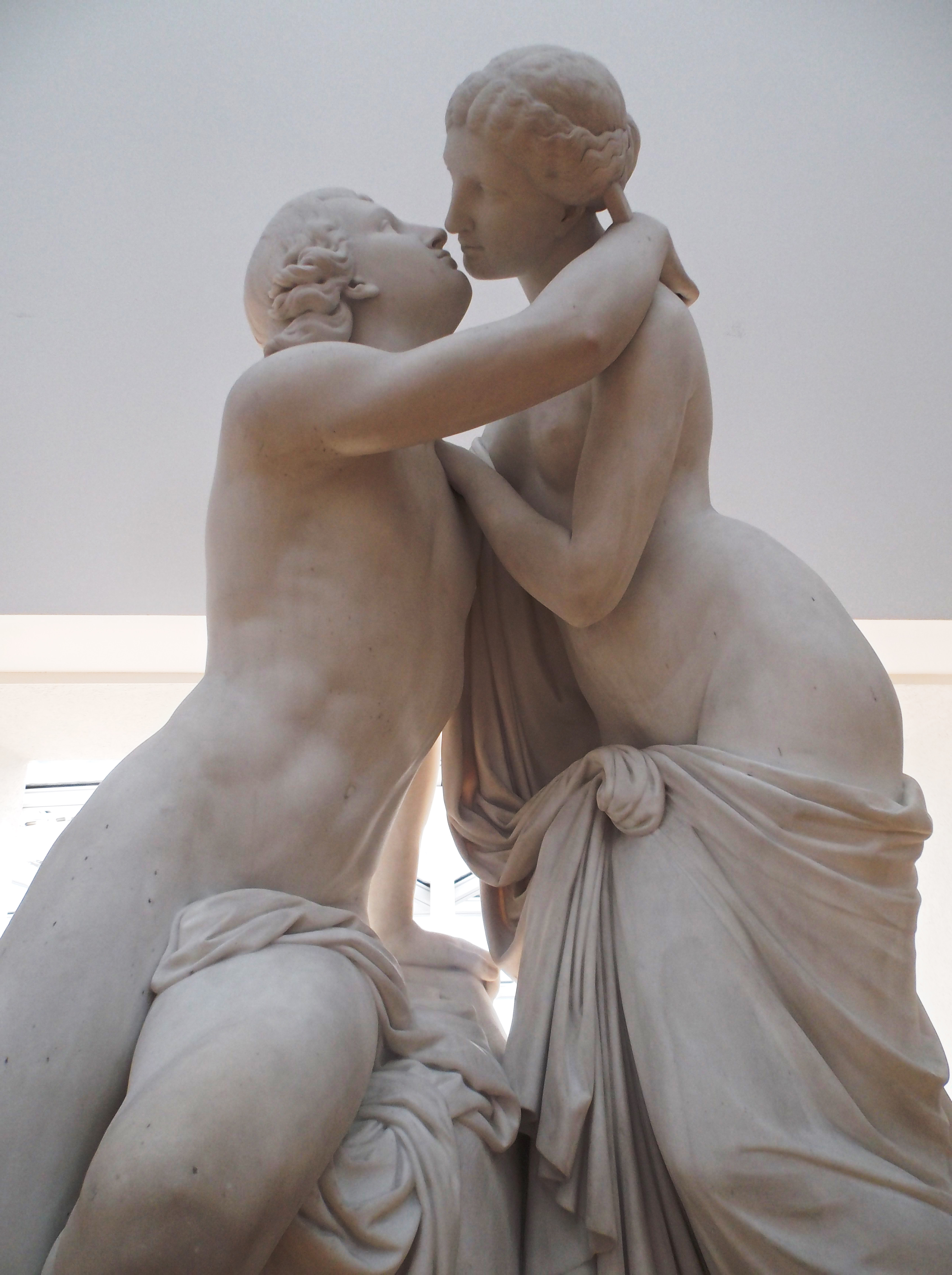

Leander is a given name. The most famous bearer of the name is mythological, from the story of Hero and Leander. Leandro is the Italian, Portuguese, and Spanish version of this name.

People named Leander include:

- Leander of Seville (c. 534–600 or 601), Catholic saint and bishop who converted the son of the Visigothic king from Arianism
- Leander Babcock (1811–64), United States Representative from New York
- Leander Carmanns (born 2004), German speed climber
- Leander Clark (1823–1910), American businessman, politician and Union Army officer during the American Civil War
- Leander C. Cole (1849–1933), American politician from Ohio
- Leander Cox (1812–65), United States Representative from Kentucky
- Leander Czerny (1859–1944), Czech entomologist
- Leander Dendoncker (born 1995), Belgian footballer
- Leander Ditscheiner (1839–1905), Austrian physicist and mathematician
- Leander F. Frisby (1825–89), American politician, lawyer and Wisconsin Attorney General
- Leander Haußmann (born 1959), German theatre and film director
- Leander Starr Jameson (1853–1917), British colonial statesman best known for the Jameson Raid on the Transvaal Republic in Africa
- Leander Jordan (born 1977), American National Football League offensive tackle
- Leander Kahney (born 1965), American journalist and author
- Leander J. McCormick 1819–1900), American inventor, manufacturer, philanthropist and businessman
- L. Hamilton McCormick (1859–1934), American author, inventor, art collector and sculptor, son of the above
- Leander H. McNelly (1844–1877), Confederate officer and Texas Ranger captain
- Leander Øy (born 2003), Norwegian footballer
- Leander Paes (born 1973), Indian tennis player
- Leander Perez (1891–1969), American Democratic Party political boss in Louisiana
- Leander Richardson (1856–1918), American journalist, playwright and theatrical writer
- Leander J. Talbott (1849–1924), American realtor and politician, former mayor of Kansas City, Missouri
- Lee Talbott (Leander James Talbott Jr.) (1887–1954), American track and field athlete
- Leander Tomarkin (1895–1967), Swiss imposter who claimed to have invented a miracle medicine
- Leander Watts, pen name of Thom Metzger (born 1956), American author of young adult literature
- Leander Wiegand (born 1999), German gridiron football player

Fictional characters include:

- Leander Sydnor, in the television series The Wire
- Leander Wapshot, in the novel The Wapshot Chronicle and its sequel by John Cheever

== See also ==
- Leander (surname)
- Leandro, the equivalent form in Castilian and Portuguese
