= Donald Gosling =

British businessman (1929–2019)

Sir Donald Gosling KCVO KStJ
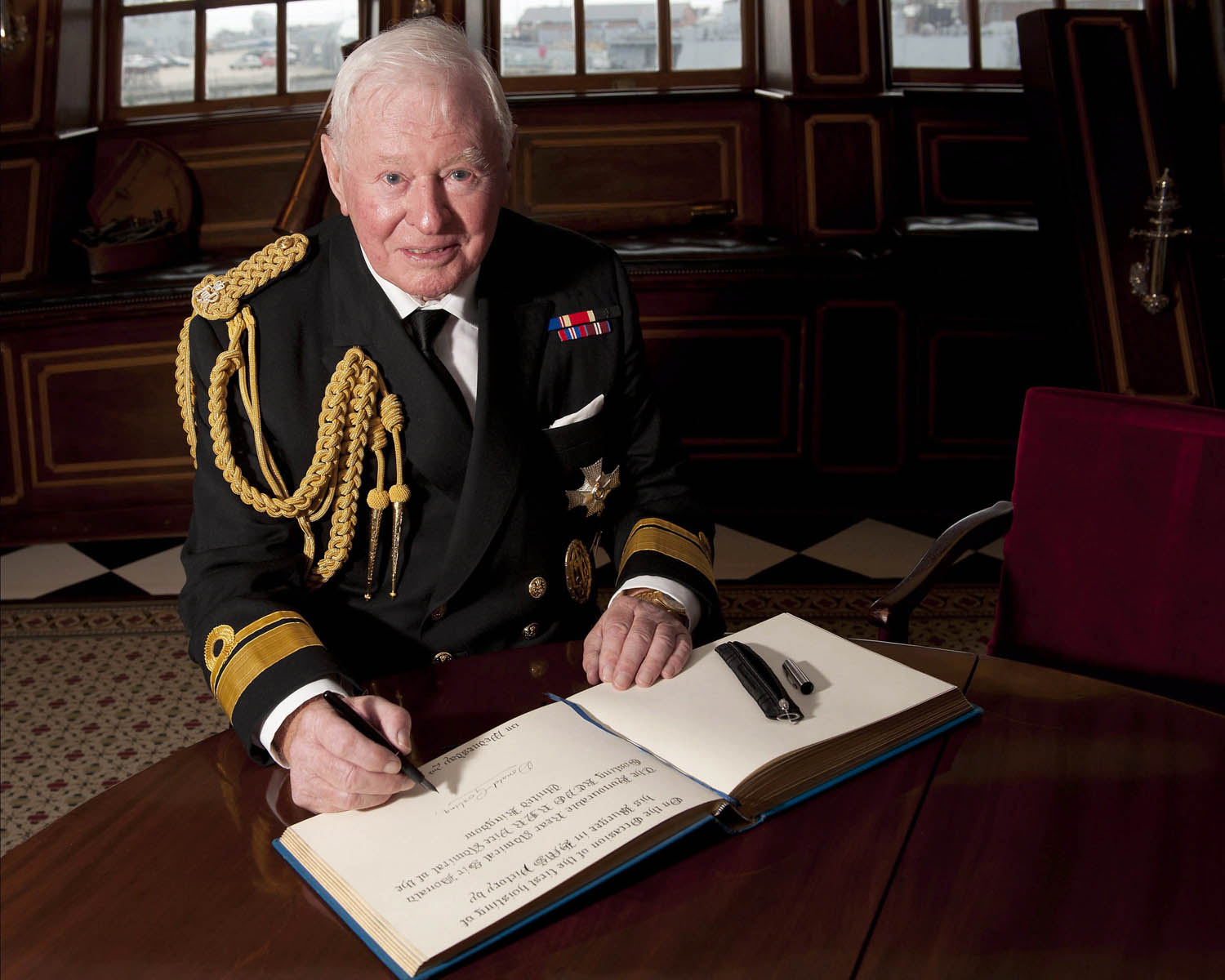
- Gosling onboard HMS Victory, May 2012
- Born: Frederick Donald Gosling; 2 March 1929
- Died: 16 September 2019 (aged 90)
- Allegiance: United Kingdom
- Branch: Royal Navy; Royal Naval Reserve
- Service years: 1944–2019
- Rank: Vice-Admiral (Honorary)
- Conflicts: World War II
- Awards: Knight Commander of the Royal Victorian Order; Knight Bachelor; Knight of the Order of St John; Grand Cross of the Order of the Eagle of Georgia

Sir Frederick Donald Gosling, KCVO KStJ (2 March 1929 – 16 September 2019) was a British businessman, who was chairman of National Car Parks. He served in the Royal Navy and later became an honorary vice admiral and a benefactor to naval charities.

== Business career ==
Gosling joined the Royal Navy in 1944 during World War II and served in the Mediterranean in the cruiser HMS Leander. After the War, together with Ronald Hobson, he founded Central Car Parks, when the pair invested £200 in a bombsite in Holborn, central London to create a car park. In 1959 Central Car Parks took over National Car Parks from Anne Lucas, the widow of Colonel Frederick Lucas. Gosling co-chaired the business until he retired in 1998.

== Retirement ==
Gosling became a trustee of the Fleet Air Arm Museum at Yeovilton in 1974 and vice-president of Seafarers UK in 1993. He was appointed honorary captain of the Royal Naval Reserve (RNR) by the Queen in January 1993; he was subsequently promoted to commodore and then to honorary rear admiral of the Reserve. He also had a long association with the White Ensign Association, serving as chairman from 1979 to 1983, vice president from 1983 to 1987 and then as president on the council of management under the patron, The Prince of Wales. In 1998 during the Kosovo War, Gosling arranged a rendezvous with the submarine HMS Splendid aboard his motor yacht Leander G to provide the men on board with fresh stores and allow them a few hours aboard the yacht in order to shower and rest.

In April 2012, he became Vice-Admiral of the United Kingdom, an honorific position sub-ordinate to the Lord High Admiral of the United Kingdom, the Duke of Edinburgh.

Gosling was knighted in the 1976 Resignation Honours List and appointed Knight Commander of the Royal Victorian Order (KCVO) in the 2004 New Year Honours for services to The Duke of Edinburgh's Award and the Outward Bound Trust.

His interests included yachting and he owned the motor yacht Leander G until she was sold in February 2016.

Gosling died on 16 September 2019, aged 90, after a short illness.

== Royal Naval Reserve ranks ==
- 27 January 1993 – May 2005: Captain (Honorary)
- 31 May 2005 – March 2009: Commodore (Honorary)
- 2 March 2009 – 2 April 2015: Rear Admiral (Honorary)
- 2 April 2015 – 16 September 2019: Vice Admiral (Honorary)

== Family and personal life ==
In 1959 Gosling married Elizabeth Shauna Ingram; together they had three sons before their marriage was dissolved in 1988.

Honorary titles
Preceded by Sir George Zambellas	Vice-Admiral of the United Kingdom; 2012–2019	Succeeded by Michael Boyce, Baron Boyce
