= Leandro Collavini =

Argentine professional footballer

Personal information
- Full name: Leandro Rodrigo Collavini
- Date of birth: 14 December 1985 (age 40)
- Place of birth: Lanús, Argentina
- Height: 1.78 m (5 ft 10 in)
- Position: Defender

Youth career
- Talleres

Senior career*
Years	Team	Apps	(Gls)
2005–2009	Talleres	73	(7)
2009–2012	Tristán Suárez	66	(9)
2012–2013	Atlético Tucumán	15	(1)
2013–2014	Atlanta	20	(0)
2014–2015	Almirante Brown	21	(0)
2016–2019	Deportivo Riestra	24	(0)
- * Club domestic league appearances and goals as of 15:57, 2 June 2019 (UTC)

Leandro Rodrigo Collavini (born 14 December 1985) is an Argentine professional footballer who plays as a defender for Deportivo Riestra.

== Career ==
Collavini's career began with Talleres of Remedios de Escalada. His spell with the club lasted four seasons from the 2005–06 campaign, with the defender appearing seventy-three times and scoring seven goals; six occurred during 2008–09, which included a brace over Central Córdoba in February 2009. In the succeeding July, after suffering relegation with Talleres, Collavini remained in the division after agreeing terms with Tristán Suárez. He scored nine goals across three seasons with the third tier side. Collavini spent the 2012–13 campaign in Primera B Nacional with Atlético Tucumán, scoring one goal across fifteen encounters.

Collavini returned to Primera B Metropolitana in June 2013, subsequently having stints across the following two years with Atlanta and Almirante Brown. January 2016 saw Collavini sign for Deportivo Riestra. Fifteen appearances followed in two seasons, with the team earning promotion to Primera B Nacional in 2016–17. His first appearance for them in the second tier arrived on 11 December 2017 versus Santamarina, in a season that saw them relegated back to tier three.

== Career statistics ==
As of 2 June 2019.

Appearances and goals by club, season and competition
Club	Season	League			Cup		League Cup		Continental		Other		Total	
Club	Season	Division	Apps	Goals	Apps	Goals	Apps	Goals	Apps	Goals	Apps	Goals	Apps	Goals
Atlético Tucumán	2012–13	Primera B Nacional	15	1	0	0	—		—		0	0	15	1
Atlanta	2013–14	Primera B Metropolitana	20	0	1	0	—		—		2 (Note: Appearance(s) in the Primera B Metropolitana play-offs)	0	23	0
Almirante Brown	2014	Primera B Metropolitana	10	0	2	0	—		—		0	0	12	0
Almirante Brown	2015	Primera B Metropolitana	11	0	0	0	—		—		0	0	11	0
Almirante Brown	Total		21	0	2	0	—		—		0	0	23	0
Deportivo Riestra	2016	Primera B Metropolitana	9	0	0	0	—		—		0	0	9	0
Deportivo Riestra	2016–17	Primera B Metropolitana	5	0	1	0	—		—		0	0	6	0
Deportivo Riestra	2017–18	Primera B Nacional	9	0	0	0	—		—		0	0	9	0
Deportivo Riestra	2018–19	Primera B Metropolitana	1	0	0	0	—		—		0	0	1	0
Deportivo Riestra	Total		24	0	1	0	—		—		0	0	25	0
Career total			82	1	4	0	—		—		0	0	86	1
