= Leandro Taub =

Argentine actor and author

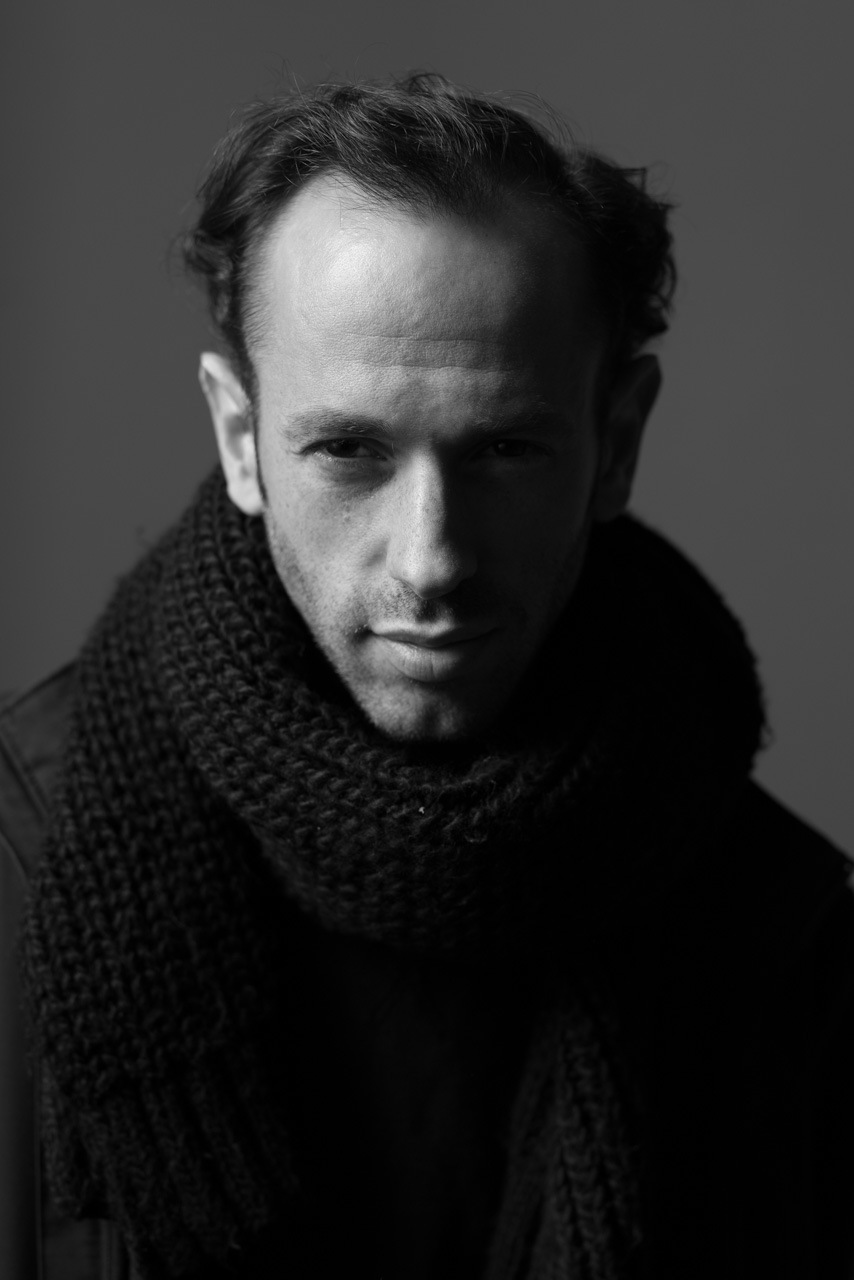
- Leandro Taub in 2015
- Born: May 5, 1983 (age 42); Buenos Aires, Argentina
- Citizenship: Argentina; Poland
- Occupation(s): Actor, Author
- Years active: 2011–present
- Website: leandrotaub.com

Leandro Taub is an Argentine actor, author, and motivational speaker who was born on May 5, 1983, in Buenos Aires and raised in Bariloche. As an actor, he debuted as the poet Enrique Lihn in Alejandro Jodorowsky's film Endless Poetry. He wrote 6 books, and one of them is Sabiduría Casera.

== Early life and education ==
Taub comes from a Polish-Jewish family. He got his degrees as a Bachelor in Economics and a Master in Finance from the University of CEMA. He also studied numerology, yoga, kabbalah, shamanism, tarot and alchemy.

== Career ==
Taub started his career as a financial analyst. By the age of 23, he had begun working as an investment advisor. He has also worked for a hedge fund and for organizations in several countries, such as the US and the UAE.

By the age of 24, after a life crisis, he left Argentina and travelled around the globe before finding his purpose in life.

In 2011, he worked with the Argentine musician Fito Páez for the music video London Town. In the same year, Taub published his first book, Sabiduría Casera (Homemade Wisdom), with the Jnana Yogi, Lou Couture, and it became a bestseller that year. Following the publishing of his first book, he became a friend of Chilean-French filmmaker Alejandro Jodorowsky who wrote the introduction to Taub's third book, La Mente Oculta (The Hidden Mind), and invited Taub two years later to play the role at Endless Poetry, that premiered at the Cannes Film Festival in 2016.

During his career, Taub wrote 6 books and 27 audiobooks on the topics of Kabbalah, Buddhism, Yoga, Shamanism, Tarot, and Numerology and gave lectures in Argentina, Mexico, and Chile about his books and work.

In 2021, he made his feature film directorial debut with the drama film Externo, which earned a 100% approval rating on Rotten Tomatoes based on 5 reviews.

== Filmography ==
=== Featured ===
| Year | Title | Director | Role |
|---|---|---|---|
| 2016 | Endless Poetry | Alejandro Jodorowsky | As Enrique Lihn |
| 2017 | Woodwind | Fin Manjoo | As Bonifaz |
| 2021 | Externo | Leandro Taub & Jonathan Taub | As Joseph |
| 2022 | A Wounded Fawn | Travis Stevens | As Marcel Champ |
| 2024 | Where to Land | Hal Hartley | As Photographer's Assistant |

=== Documentary ===
| Year | Title | Director | Role |
|---|---|---|---|
| 2015 | Quién soy? (Who am I?) | Luis Alvarez Armenta | Leandro Taub |

=== Short films ===
| Year | Title | Director |
|---|---|---|
| 2016 | An Innocent Mind Has No Fear | Ralf Schmerberg |
| 2017 | Bed | Florian Tscharf |
| 2022 | All Tomorrow's People | Jivensley Alexis |
| 2024 | The Resident | Sergio Graman |

=== Upcoming ===
- The Dream of the Guest: with the actors Amanda Plummer, Jean-Marc Barr, John Robinson, Lizzie Brocheré and Udo Kier, co-produced by the German producer Peter Rommel.

== Books ==
| Year | Title |
|---|---|
| 2011 | Sabiduría Casera |
| 2012 | Santo Diablo |
| 2013 | La Mente Oculta |
| 2014 | Homemade Wisdom |
| 2016 | Cuentos para la mente oculta |
| 2016 | El Anarquista |
| 2025 | Romance |

== Personal life ==
In 2015 he was the boyfriend of the Argentine actress Celeste Cid.
