= Leandro Viotto =

Argentine entrepreneur (born 1985)

Leandro Viotto Romano
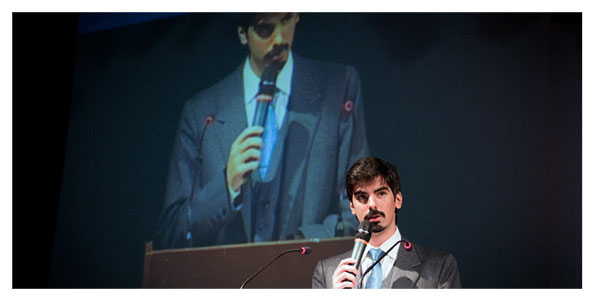
- Leandro Viotto, 2011
- Born: September 28, 1985 (age 41); Buenos Aires, Argentina
- Occupation: Entrepreneur
- Known for: Founder and CEO of the International Young Leaders Foundation
- Awards: CICSI Bronze Medal (2012)

Leandro Viotto Romano (born September 28, 1985, in Buenos Aires) is an Argentine entrepreneur. He is the founder and Chief Executive Officer (Spanish: Fundación Internacional de Jóvenes Líderes), of the International Young Leaders Foundation.

== Career ==
In 2008, Romano established the International Young Leaders Foundation.

He is the author of two books, published in Spanish: Lo que me dejan los 30 (translated as What 30 Gave Me) and El derecho a no ser pobres (translated as The Right Not to Be Poor).

In 2015, Romano launched Todos x Todos, a donation-focused app that was available for Android and iOS.

He has also served as a technical advisor to the Argentine Chamber of Deputies.

== Awards ==
- 2012 – CICSI Bronze Medal, Foro Italico University of Rome, in collaboration with Internazionali per la Cooperazione allo Sviluppo
- Medal of Illustrious Visitor from the Mayor of Pachuca
- Special recognition from the Capitol of Puerto Rico, following a vote of its House of Representatives
- Keys to the City awarded by the Mayor of Cataño
