= Leander class =

Leander class may refer to one of three ship classes operated by the Royal Navy (and in two instances, other naval forces);

- Leander-class cruiser (1882), a four-ship class of protected cruisers operated from 1885 to 1919.
- Leander-class cruiser (1931), an eight-ship class of light cruisers operational between 1933 and 1978.
- Leander-class frigate, a class of 26 frigates in service from the mid-1960s until the 1990s.
