= Leandro Moldes =

Leandro
- Also known as: Leandro
- Born: Leandro Moldes; 26 May 1986 (age 40); Spain
- Origin: Switzerland
- Genre: Pop
- Occupation: Singer
- Instrument: vocals
- Years active: 2000
- Label: BMG Berlin

Leandro Moldes is a Swiss former singer, born 26 May 1986 in Spain to Rita and Manuel. He has a sister, Riwana.

In 2000, Leandro released a CD titled Leandro and a 6-track maxi single titled Girl, under the BMG Berlin label.

He currently (2014) serves as the managing director of Moldes International Commodity Trading (Moldes ICT) located in Wabern bei Bern. He lives near Bern, Switzerland.

== Discography ==
=== Solo albums ===
- Leandro (BMG 74321 75097-2, 16-track CD) 2000
1. Girl, 4:17
2. Close to You, 3:51
3. What Will I Become, 3:53
4. You Are Like Music, 3:07
5. Good Times of Your Life, 3:16
6. I Adore Mi Amor, 3:54
7. Explain This World to Me, 4:57
8. Love Letters, 3:52
9. Do What You Like, 3:02
10. Smile, 3:15
11. Wanna Hold Your Hand, 3:32
12. L.O.V.E, 4:20
13. If Only You Were Here, 3:40
14. Too Shy, 3:13
15. Good Day, 3:25
16. You Must Not Be Sorry, 4:47

=== Singles ===
- Girl (BMG 74321 74516-2, 6-track CD Single) 2000
1. Girl [Radio/Video], 4:17
2. Girl [U.S. Version], 4:57
3. Girl [Club-Mix], 6:28
4. Girl [House-Mix], 6:02
5. Girl [Instrumental], 4:15
6. Girl [Just for you], 1:12

=== Trivia ===
He is fluent in 7 different languages.
