= Meserret III =

Luxury yacht built by Peene-Werft

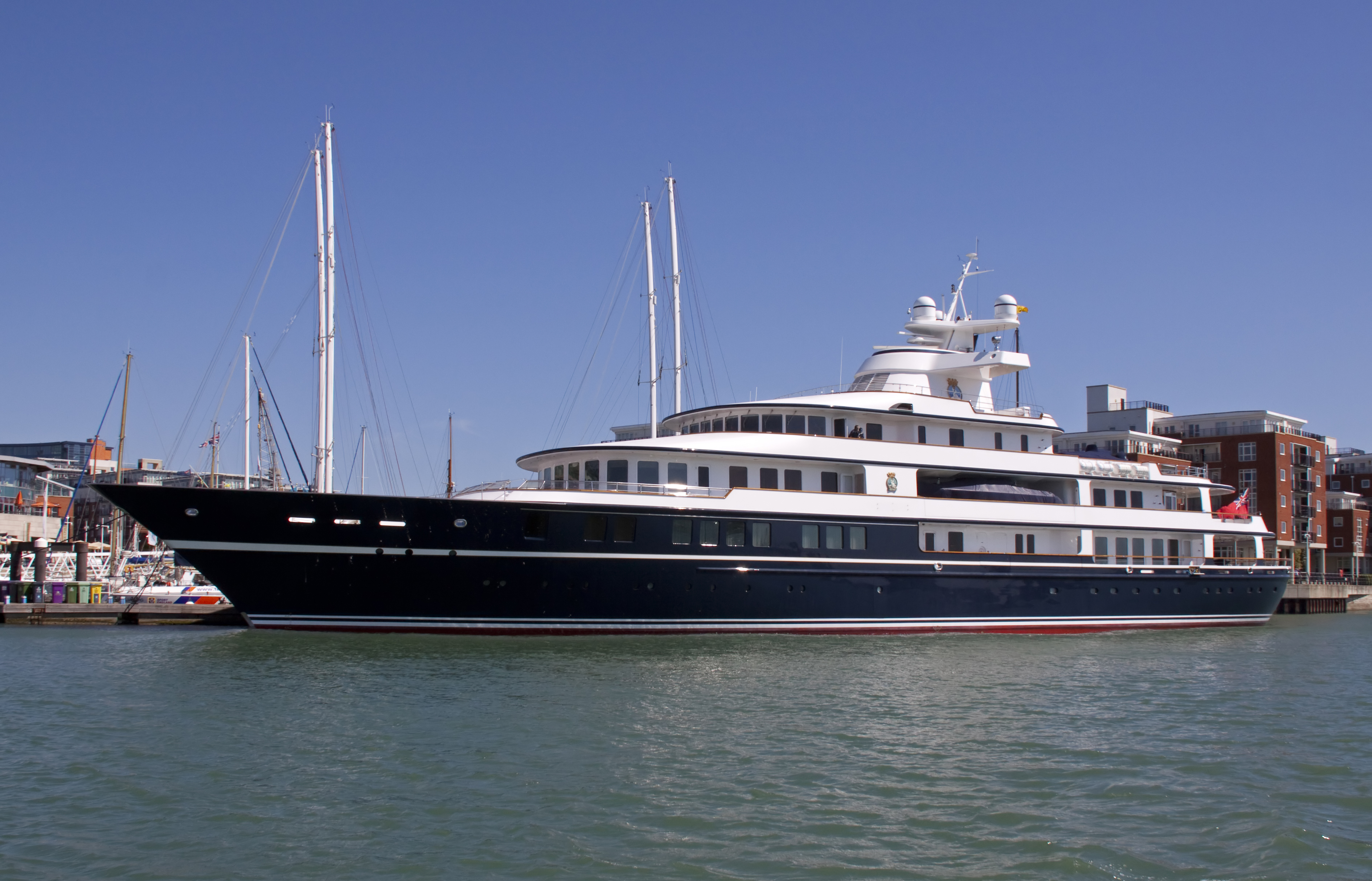
- Meserret III at Gunwharf Quays at Portsmouth Harbour United Kingdom

History

Bermuda
- Name: Meserret III
- Owner: Mehmet Ömer Koç
- Port of registry: Hamilton, Bermuda
- Builder: Peene-Werft, Wolgast, Germany
- Launched: 1992
- Identification: IMO number: 1002445; MMSI number: 310216000; Callsign: ZCAS9

General characteristics
- Type: Luxury Yacht
- Tonnage: 1,930 GT; 579 NT
- Length: 75 m (246 ft 1 in) o/a
- Beam: 12.9 m (42 ft 4 in)
- Draught: 4.2 m (13 ft 9 in)
- Propulsion: 2 × Deutz 2,649 kW (3,552 hp) 12M 628 diesel engines; 1 × Schottel 170 kW (230 hp) bow thruster; 1 × Schottel 195 kW (261 hp) pump-jet stern thruster
- Speed: 18.5 knots (34.3 km/h; 21.3 mph)
- Range: 8,000 nmi (15,000 km; 9,200 mi) at 14.5 kn (26.9 km/h; 16.7 mph)
- Boats & landing craft carried: 2 × 10 m (33 ft) tenders; 3 × Jet Skis; 2 × Laser Pico dinghies
- Crew: 24
- Sensors & processing systems: S & X-Band ARPA radar
- Aviation facilities: Helicopter Deck

MY Meserret III is a luxury yacht built by Peene-Werft at Wolgast in 1992. The yacht was formerly known as Leander G. She is owned by Mehmet Ömer Koç.

== Design ==
Meserret III was designed by Claus Kusch, who had previously designed two yachts named Katalina for the original owner, Brigadier Sir Timothy Landon. Her steel hull has a bulbous bow, a classic canoe stern, together with a helicopter deck and topped by a three deck aluminium superstructure - six decks in total. She has a range of communal guest areas including a Main Saloon and Dining room on her Main Deck, a Boat deck saloon, Jacuzzi Deck, Observation Deck and Study, a Fitness room, a Dive Room and Swim Platform. There are 10 suites in total, consisting of two Master suites with office/study and a forward facing saloon, 3 double guest cabins with en-suite bathrooms and 5 twin guest cabins with bathrooms. In all, she can accommodate 22 guests as well as a crew of 23.

== Commission ==
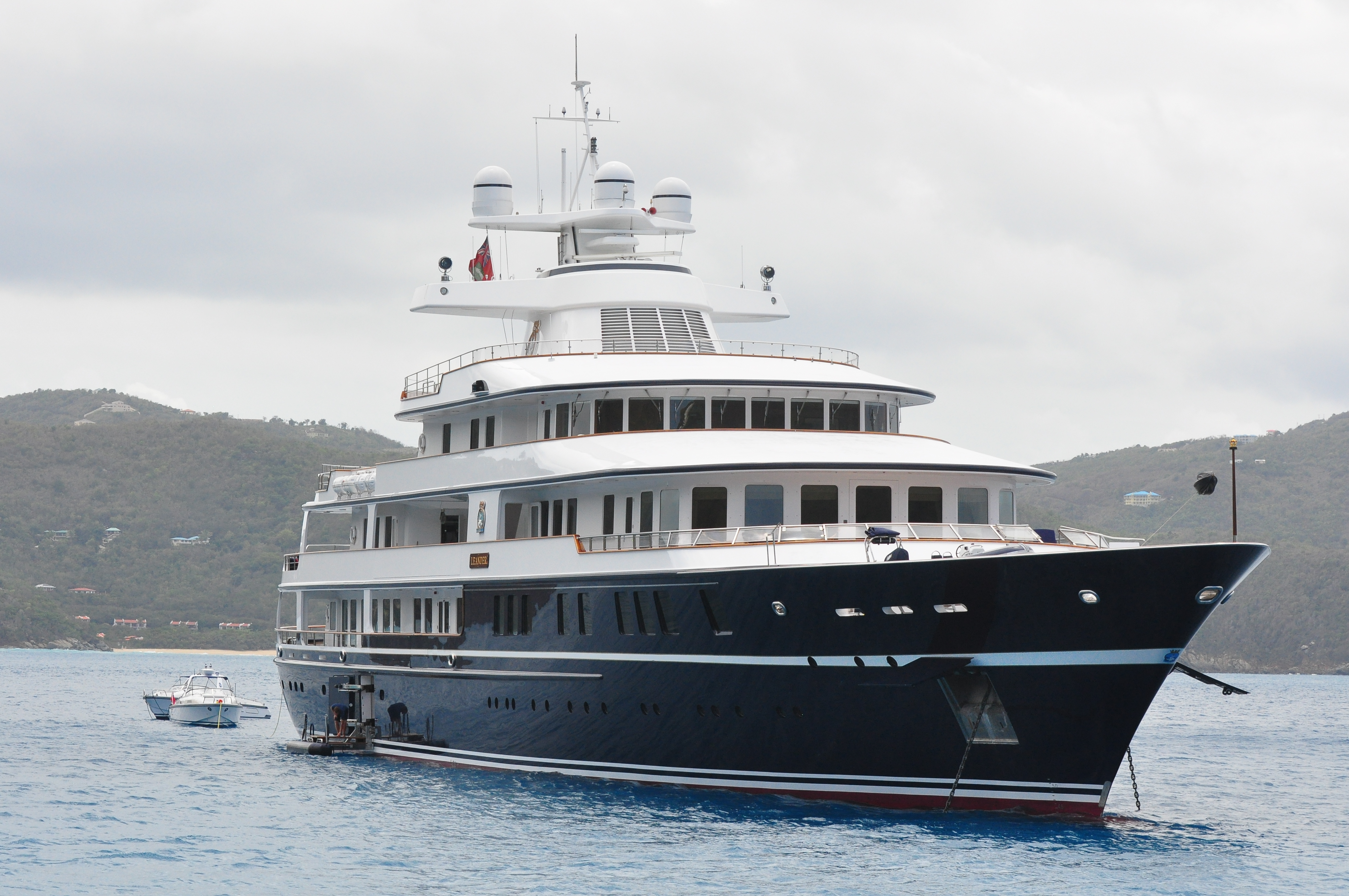
Meserret III, a yacht at the British Virgin Islands.

The yacht was ordered in October 1990 by Brigadier Sir Timothy Landon from the former East German shipyard Peene-Werft at Wolgast to replace his yacht Katalina, his second of that name. After shipping to a Hamburg shipyard for outfitting, the arrangement of the interior accommodation was undertaken by Pauline Nunns Associates, and interior decorator Heinz Vollers of Hamburg. Part way through outfitting, Landon decided to keep his existing Katalina, reportedly due to ill-health, and sold the yet-unnamed vessel to Sir Donald Gosling, who took over the final stages of the build at what was described as an excellent price. Gosling (who coincidentally had later owned Landon's original yacht Katalina of 1992) named the yacht after the cruiser HMS Leander, the first Royal Navy ship in which he served. She was refitted in 1998 and 2001. Under Gosling's ownership, Meserret III habitually flew the British White Ensign as Gosling was a member of the Royal Yacht Squadron, but the Red Ensign is flown when chartered (see photograph). Gosling sold the yacht in February 2016 through broker Peter Insull to an unnamed private buyer, who removed the yacht from the charter market.

== Chartering ==
During her ownership by Gosling the yacht was available for charter, certified with accommodation for up to 12 guests, serviced by 23/28 crew. Meserret III remained one of the most expensive British-owned yachts on the charter market, until the launch of the 280-foot Greek-built Annaliesse. Gianni Agnelli of Fiat and the gossip columnist Taki have previously chartered Meserret III.

== Royal Family ==
Following the decommissioning of the Royal Yacht Britannia, she was used by members of the British royal family. In summer 2007, she was chartered by then Camilla, Duchess of Cornwall for a holiday in the Mediterranean. In February 2008, she was chartered by Charles, Prince of Wales and the Duchess of Cornwall for their royal tour of islands in the Caribbean.

== See also ==
- List of motor yachts by length
