= Hero and Leander =

Greek myth about tragic lovers

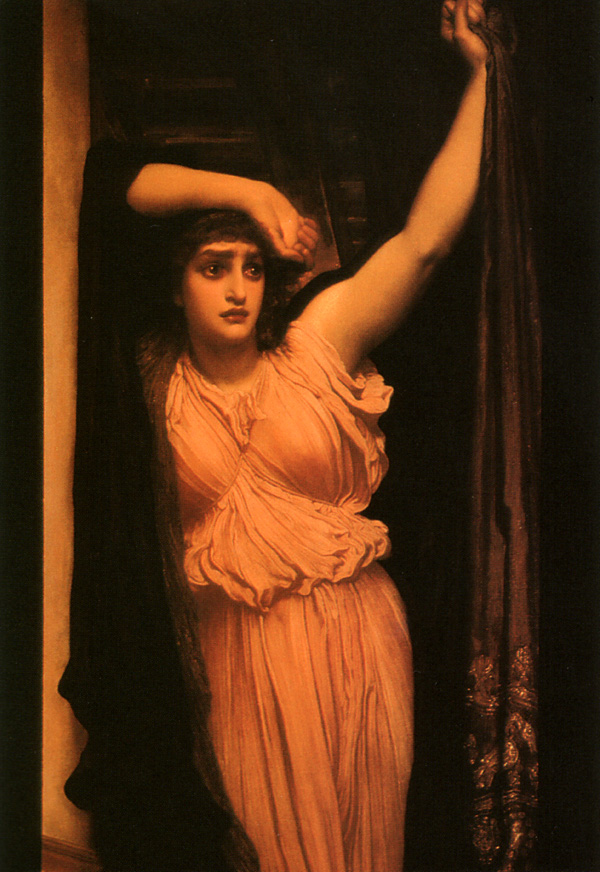
The Last Watch of Hero by Frederic Leighton, depicting Hero anxiously waiting for Leander during the storm

Hero and Leander (/ˈhiːroʊ/, /liːˈændər/; Ancient Greek: Ἡρώ καὶ Λέανδρος) is the Greek myth relating the story of Hero (Ancient Greek: Ἡρώ, Hērṓ; [hɛː.rɔ̌ː]), a priestess (hiereia) of Aphrodite (Venus in Roman mythology) who dwelt in a tower in Sestos on the European side of the Hellespont, and Leander (Ancient Greek: Λέανδρος, Léandros; [lé.an.dros]), a young man from Abydos on the opposite side of the strait.

== Myth ==
Leander falls in love with Hero and swims every night across the Hellespont to spend time with her. Hero lights a lamp at the top of her tower to guide his way. Leander's soft words and charms—and his argument that Aphrodite, as the goddess of love and sex, would scorn the worship of a virgin—convince Hero, and they make love. Their secret love affair lasts through a warm summer, but when winter and its rougher weather looms, they agree to part for the season and resume in the spring. One stormy winter night, however, Leander sees the torch at the top of Hero's tower. He attempts to go to her, but halfway through his swim, a strong winter wind blows out Hero's light, and Leander loses his way and drowns. When Hero sees his dead body, she throws herself off the tower to join him in death. Their bodies wash up on shore together, locked in embrace, and are then subsequently buried in a lovers’ tomb.

== Attestations ==
The myth is attested in Ovid's Heroides, in poet Mousaios' (or Musaeus') epic poem, and is alluded to in Vergil's Georgics.

The Double Heroides (attributed to Ovid) treats the narrative in 18 and 19, an exchange of letters between the lovers. Leander has been unable to swim across to Hero in her tower because of bad weather; her summons to him to make the effort will prove fatal to her lover.

== Cultural references ==
The myth of Hero and Leander has been used extensively in literature and the arts:

=== In classical antiquity ===
- Ancient Roman coins of Abydos (Troas): Septimius Severus, Caracalla

=== In music ===
- George Frideric Handel's 1707 solo cantata in Italian, Ero e Leandro (HWV 150), is based on the tale.
- Franz Grillparzer's 1831 tragedy Des Meeres und der Liebe Wellen is based on the tale.
- Robert Schumann said that he perceived his "In der Nacht" from Fantasiestücke, Op. 12 (1837) as depicting the story of Hero and Leandros.
- Franz Liszt's Ballade No. 2 in B minor (1853) was, according to Claudio Arrau, inspired by the myth.
- Arrigo Boito composed an opera, Ero e Leandro, but destroyed it. His libretto was later set by Giovanni Bottesini (1879) and Luigi Mancinelli (1897).
- Alfredo Catalani composed a tone-poem, Ero e Leandro (1885), based on the tale.
- Victor Herbert composed a tone-poem, Hero and Leander (1901).

=== In painting ===
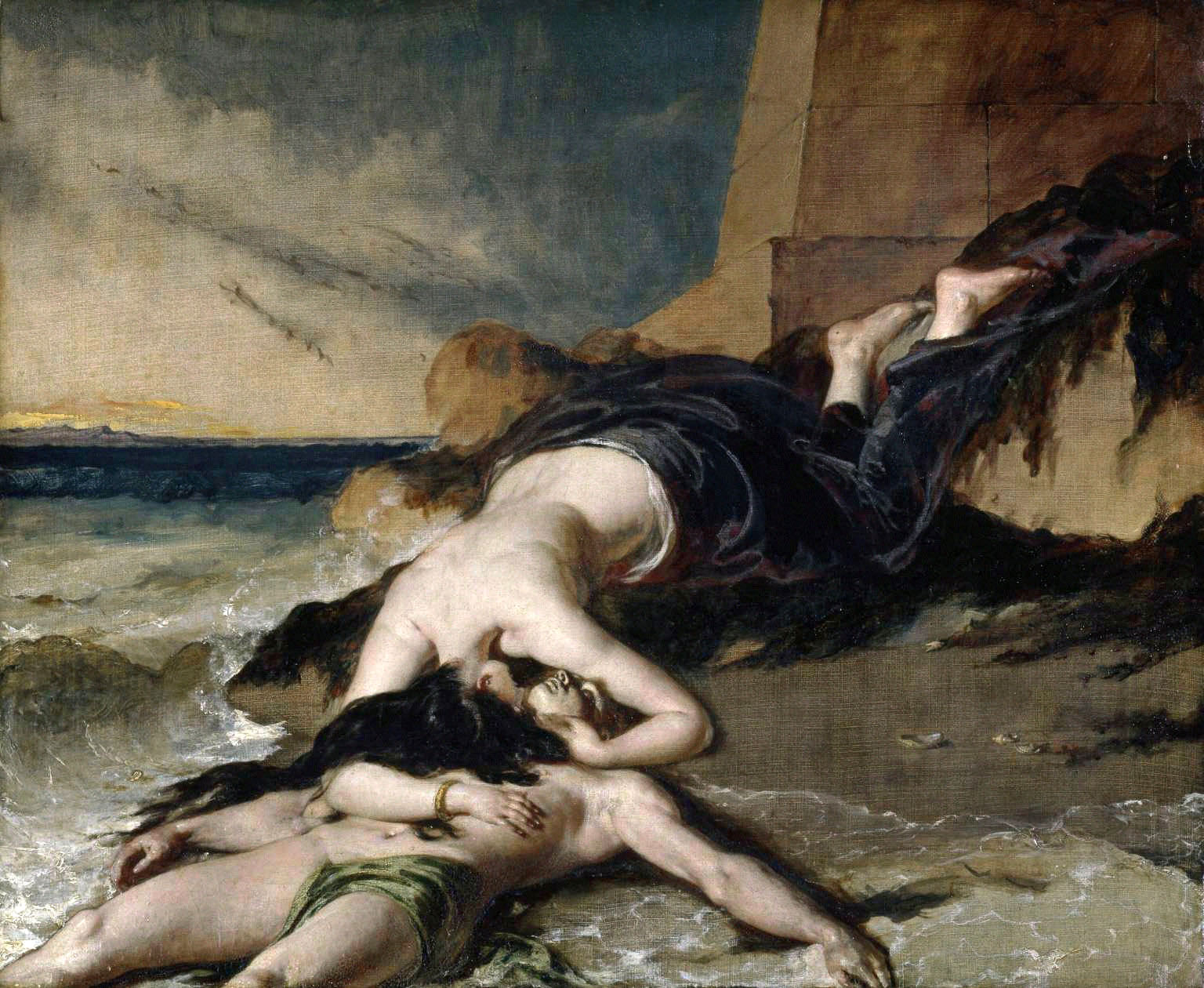
Hero and Leander by William Etty, 1829

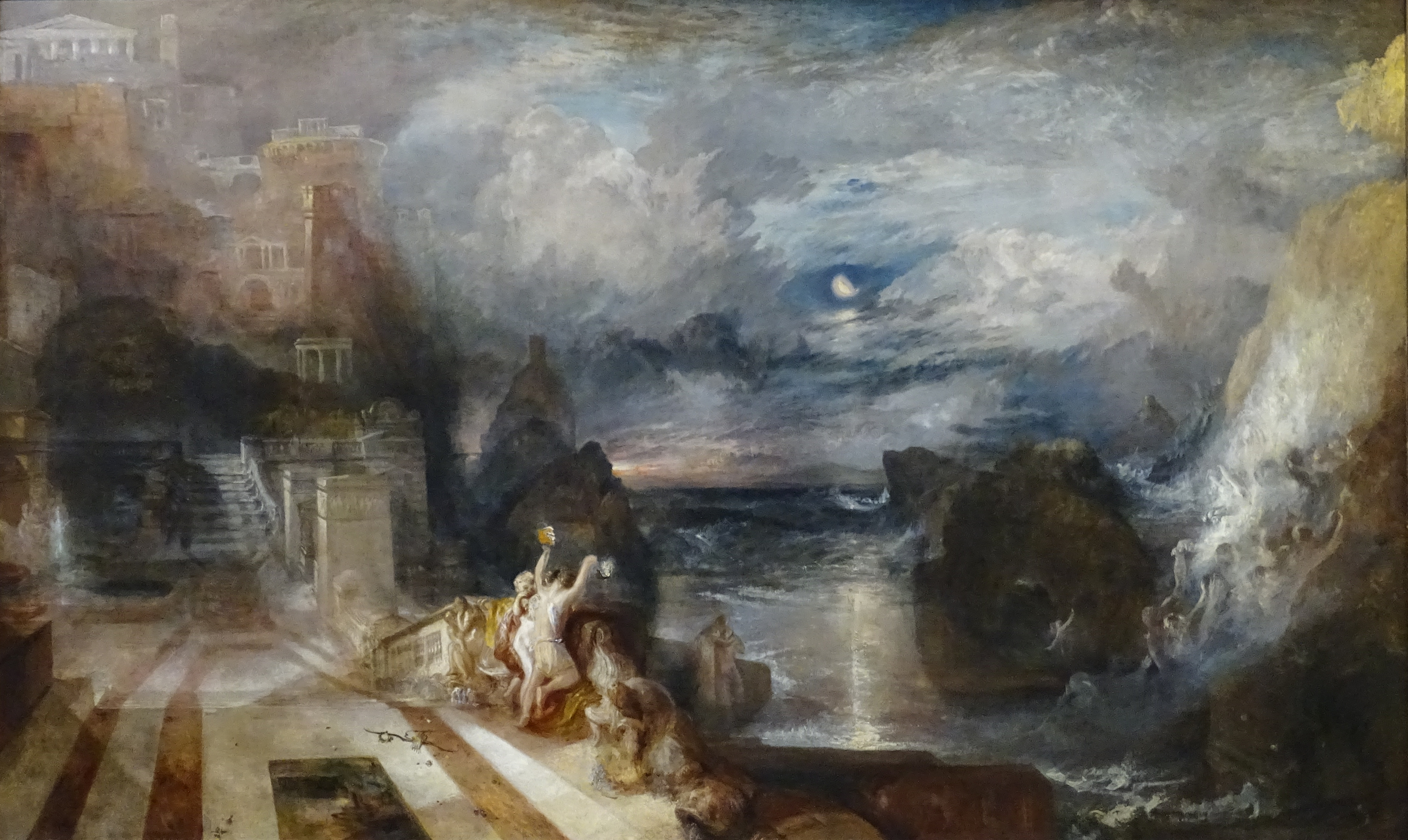
The Parting of Hero and Leander by J. M. W. Turner, 1837

- Peter Paul Rubens painted a picture named Hero and Leander in 1604 based on the tale.
- William Etty painted Hero, Having Thrown herself from the Tower at the Sight of Leander Drowned, Dies on his Body in 1829. He later said he considered the painting the "finest of my fine pictures".
- Cy Twombly completed a painting in Rome in 1985 inspired by the story as told by Christopher Marlowe. The painting is entitled Hero and Leander (To Christopher Marlowe).
- Evelyn De Morgan painted Hero Holding the Beacon for Leander in 1885.

=== In literature ===
- The 6th-century Byzantine poet Musaeus also wrote a poem; Aldus Manutius made it one of his first publications (c. 1493) after he set up his famous printing press in Venice (his humanistic aim was to make Ancient Greek Literature available to scholars). Musaeus's poem had early translations into European languages by Bernardo Tasso (Italian), Boscán (Spanish) and Clément Marot (French). This poem was widely believed in the Renaissance to have been pre-Homeric: George Chapman reflects at the end of his completion of Marlowe's version that the dead lovers had the honour of being "the first that ever poet sung". Chapman's 1616 translation has the title The divine poem of Musaeus. First of all bookes. Translated according to the original, by Geo: Chapman. Staplyton, the mid-17th century translator, had read Scaliger's repudiation of this mistaken belief, but still could not resist citing Virgil's 'Musaeum ante omnes' (Aeneid VI, 666) on the title page of his translation (Virgil's reference was to an earlier Musaeus).

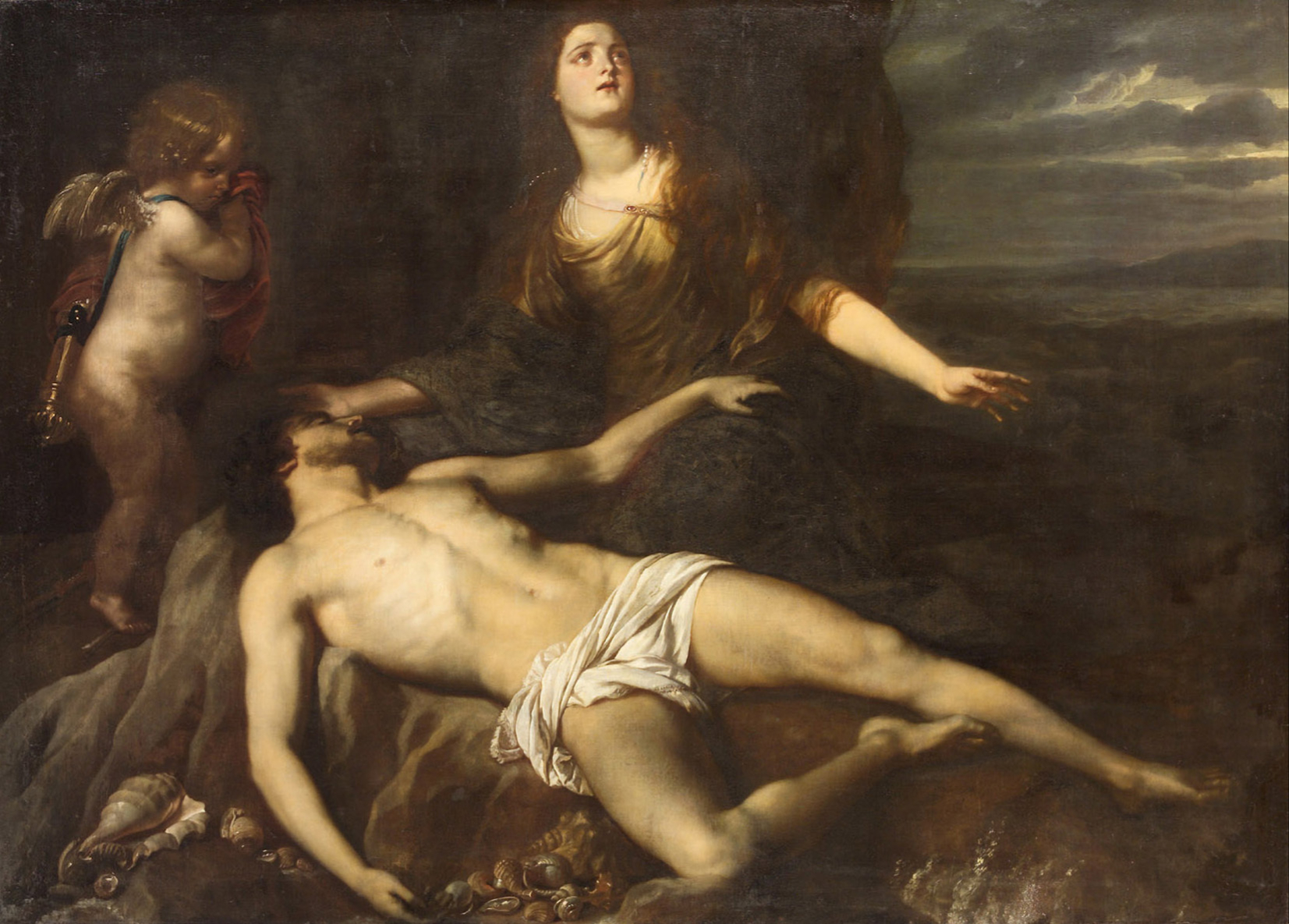
Hero laments the dead Leander by Jan van den Hoecke

- Renaissance poet Christopher Marlowe (1564–1593) began an expansive version of the narrative (Hero and Leander). His story does not get as far as Leander's nocturnal swim, and the guiding lamp that gets extinguished, but ends after the two have become lovers.
- George Chapman completed Marlowe's poem after Marlowe's death; this version was often reprinted in the first half of the 17th century, with editions in 1598 (Linley); 1600 and 1606 (Flasket); 1609, 1613, 1617, 1622 (Blount); 1629 (Hawkins); and 1637 (Leake).
- Sir Walter Raleigh (c. 1552–1618) alludes to the story, in his "The Ocean's Love to Cynthia", in which Hero has fallen asleep, and fails to keep alight the lamp that guides Leander on his swim (more kindly versions, like Chapman's, have her desperately struggling to keep the lamp burning).
- It is also the subject of a novel by Milorad Pavić, Inner Side of the Wind (1991).
- Leander is also the subject of Sonnet XXIX by Spanish poet Garcilaso de la Vega of the 16th century;
- John Donne (1572–1631) has an epigram summing up the story in two lines:

Both robbed of air, we both lie in one ground,
Both whom one fire had burnt, one water drowned.

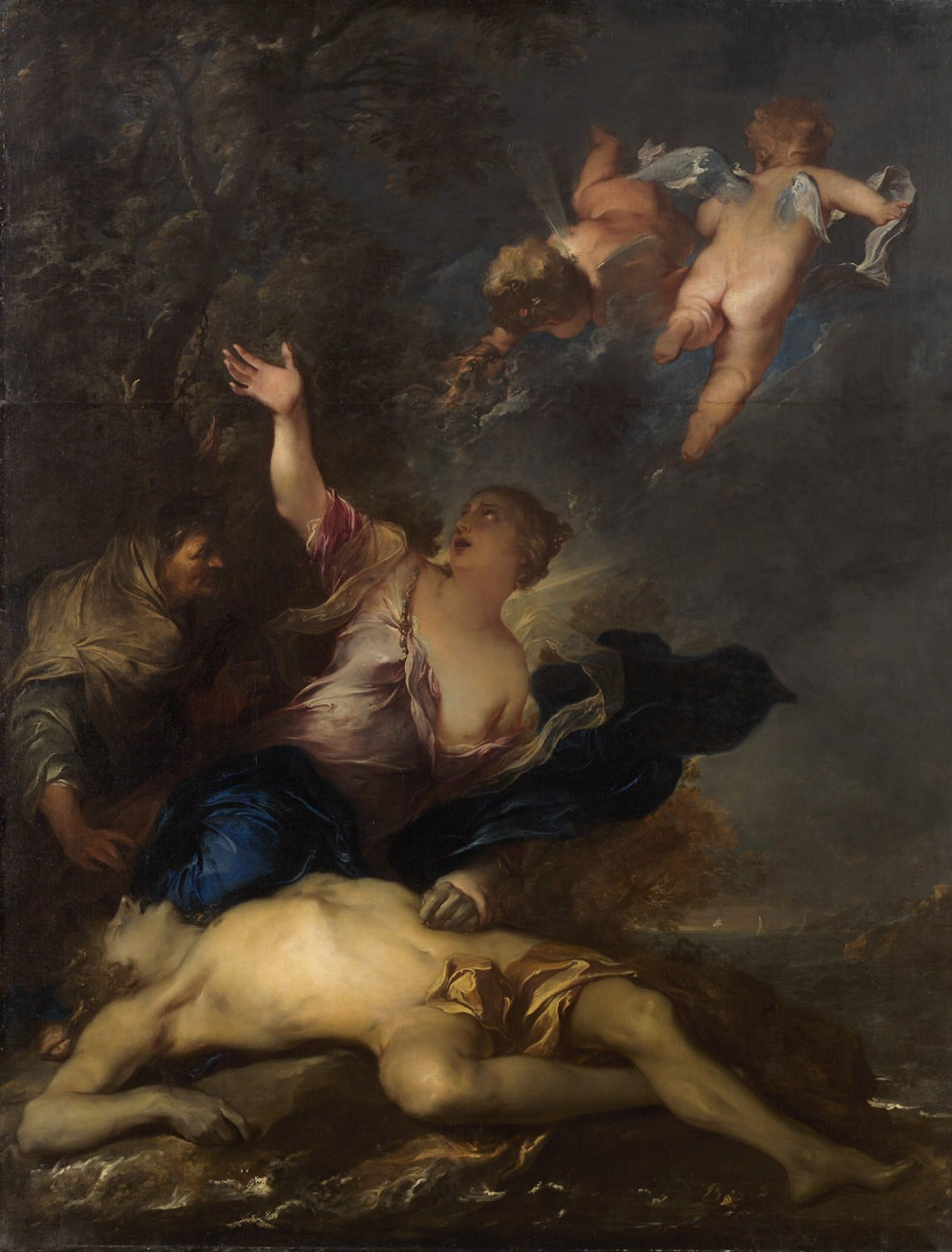
Hero mourns the dead Leander by Gillis Backereel

- The myth is central to John Keats' 1817 sonnet, "On an Engraved Gem of Leander".
- Myths and Hymns (1998), by Adam Guettel, contains a song named after the pair.
- Leigh Hunt's 1819 poem Hero and Leander is based on the myth.
- Letitia Elizabeth Landon's poem Leander and Hero first appeared in 1823. Significantly, she reversed the usual order of names and used it as an example of mutual constancy.
- Lord Byron references Leander in "Written After Swimming From Sestos To Abydos"; the myth of Hero and Leander inspired his own swim across the Hellespont (i.e., the Dardanelles) in May, 1810. Byron also alludes to his feat, with further reference to Leander, both in The Bride of Abydos (1813) and in Don Juan (1819–1824), canto II, stanza 105.
- In Chapter XVII of "Two Years Before the Mast" (1840), Richard Henry Dana Jr. relates an anecdote of the ship's cook, who had so bonded with a sow, "Old Bess", who had stayed aboard the vessel all the first months of the voyage, that after the sow had been taken ashore in San Diego, the cook "could hardly have been more attentive, for he actually, on several nights, after dark, when he thought he would not be seen, sculled himself ashore in a boat with a bucket of nice swill, and returned like Leander from crossing the Hellespont".
- Les Misérables (1862), by Victor Hugo, has a reference to the myth in Jean Valjean, Book V. Referring to the reaction of a duchess when she heard of the fate of her lover who died by drowning in the quicksand in Paris' sewers, Hugo comments that "Hero refuses to wash Leander's corpse."

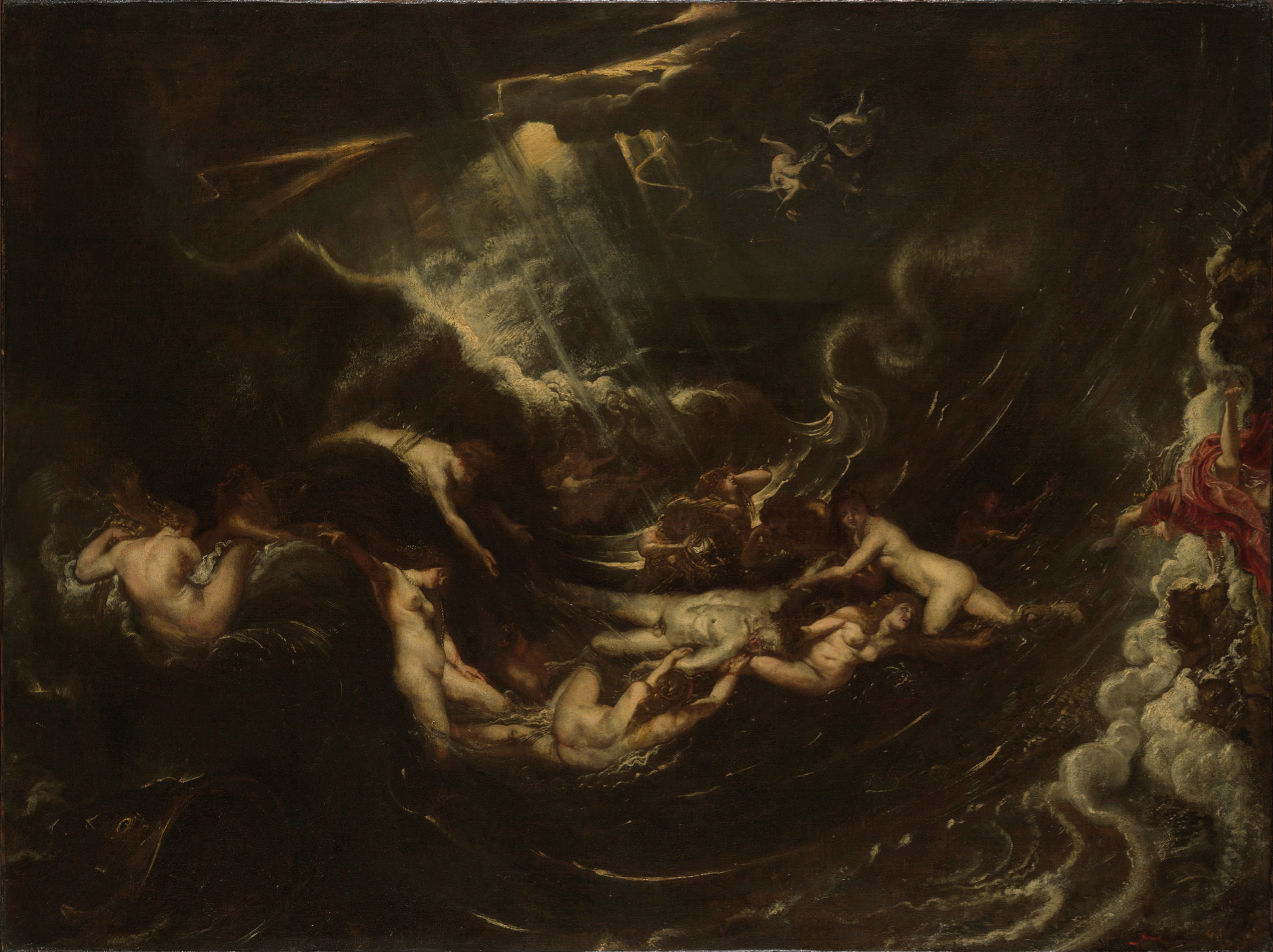
Hero and Leander by Peter Paul Rubens, c. 1604

- In the collection of short stories and essays by Lafcadio Hearn, In Ghostly Japan (1899), the author is told the popular story of a girl who swims to her lover guided by a lantern, and he comments on the similarities with the western story: "—'So,' I said to myself, 'in the Far East, it is poor Hero that does the swimming. And what, under such circumstances, would have been the Western estimate of Leander?'"
- Rudyard Kipling (1865–1936) started his poem "A Song of Travel" with the words: "Where's the lamp that Hero lit / Once to call Leander home?"
- Alfred Tennyson's poem "Hero to Leander" has Hero begging her lover not to leave until the morning when the sea has calmed "Thou shalt not wander hence to-night, I'll stay thee with my kisses".
- On 28 September 1926 James Thurber penned a parody of Hero and Leander in 31 tabloid headlines in Franklin P. Adams column The Conning Tower published in the New York World. Reasonably funny Thurber.
- Poem XV of A. E. Housman's More Poems (1936) is devoted to the myth. It describes how, "[b]y Sestos town, in Hero's tower / On Hero's heart Leander lies..."

=== In theatre ===
- Shakespeare mentions the story in the opening scene of Two Gentlemen of Verona, in a dialogue between Valentine and Proteus (the two gentlemen in the play):

VALENTINE: And on a love-book pray for my success?
PROTEUS: Upon some book I love I'll pray for thee.
VALENTINE: That's on some shallow story of deep love: How young Leander cross'd the Hellespont.
PROTEUS: That's a deep story of a deeper love: For he was more than over shoes in love.
VALENTINE: 'Tis true; for you are over boots in love, And yet you never swum the Hellespont.

- Hero and Leander are again mentioned in The Two Gentlemen of Verona in act 3, scene 1, when Valentine is tutoring the Duke of Milan on how to woo the lady from Milan. Shakespeare also alludes to the story in Much Ado About Nothing, both when Benedick states that Leander was "never so truly turned over and over as my poor self in love" and in the name of the character Hero, who, despite accusations to the contrary, remains chaste before her marriage; and in A Midsummer Night's Dream in the form of a malapropism accidentally using the names Helen and Limander in the place of Hero and Leander, as well as in Edward III (act 2, scene 2), Othello (act 3, scene 3), and Romeo and Juliet (act 2, scene 4). The most famous Shakespearean allusion is the debunking one by Rosalind, in act 4, scene 1, of As You Like It:

Leander, he would have lived many a fair year, though Hero had turned nun, if it had not been for a hot midsummer night; for, good youth, he went but forth to wash him in the Hellespont and being taken with the cramp was drowned and the foolish coroners of that age found it was 'Hero of Sestos'. But these are all lies: men have died from time to time and worms have eaten them, but not for love.

- Ben Jonson's play Bartholomew Fair (1614) features a puppet show of Hero and Leander in act 5, translated to London, with the Thames serving as the Hellespont between the lovers.
- Dion Boucicault mentions Leander in his play The Colleen Bawn (1860). Corrigan refers to Hardress Cregan and his nocturnal boat-rides to his secret wife as being "like Leander, barring the wetting".

=== In folkloristics ===
In folkloristics, the myth of lovers Hero and Leander becomes the Aarne-Thompson-Uther tale type ATU 666*, "Hero and Leander".

Variants of the tale are also attested in Japan, where they appear as a local legends. In Hiroko Ikeda's index of Japanese folktales, the type is known as Tarai-bune no Momoyo Gayoi. Philologist and folklorist Julian Krzyżanowski, establisher of the Polish Folktale Catalogue according to the international index, located variants of the lovers' myth in Poland, which he classified as T 667, "Hero i Leander" ("Hero and Leander").

The myth seems to have inspired a literary version by Italian author Giovanni Francesco Straparola in his work The Facetious Nights of Straparola.

Child ballad number 216 can be read as a variant.

=== Contemporary references ===
- There have been six ships of the Royal Navy named HMS Leander with battle honors at the Nile, Algiers, Crimea, and the Kula Gulf.
- LMS express steam locomotive 5690 is named "Leander", named after the ship HMS Leander. It was built in 1936 and has survived into preservation, and still operates on the main line in Britain.
- Numerous private ships have been named Leander, including that of Sir Donald Gosling, whose yacht Leander G was chartered by the royal family following the decommissioning of the royal yacht HMY Britannia.
- There have been numerous ships named Hero, although it's unclear if they were named for Leander's Hero, or the classical definition of one who does heroic deeds. However the 1970s television drama series Warship specifically identifies its fictional HMS Hero, a Leander-class frigate, in honor of Leander's Hero.
