= List of people from Quincy, Illinois =

The following list includes notable people who were born or have lived in Quincy, Illinois. For a similar list organized alphabetically by last name, see the category page People from Quincy, Illinois.

== Acting and comedy ==
Name	Image	Birth	Death	Known for	Association	Reference
John Anderson		October 20, 1922	August 7, 1992	Actor and director (Twilight Zone, Gunsmoke)	Raised in Quincy	
Mary Astor		May 3, 1906	September 25, 1987	Actress (The Maltese Falcon, The Great Lie)	Born in Quincy	
Roy Brocksmith		September 15, 1945	December 16, 2001	Actor (Total Recall, Arachnophobia)	Born in Quincy and graduated from Quincy University in 1970.	
Harry Fleer		March 26, 1916	October 14, 1994	Actor (Little Giants, Tormented)	Born in Quincy	
Donald Gallaher		June 25, 1895	August 14, 1961	Actor and director (The Great Train Robbery, Temple Tower)	Born in Quincy	
Tad Hilgenbrink		October 9, 1981		Actor (American Pie Presents: Band Camp, The Curiosity of Chance)	Born in Quincy and attended Quincy Senior High School	
Henry Kolker		November 13, 1874	July 15, 1947	Actor	Family moved to Quincy when he was young	
Robert Livingston		December 9, 1904	March 7, 1988	Actor (The Three Mesquiteers, The Lone Ranger Rides Again)	Born in Quincy	
Irving Sayles		1872	February 8, 1914	Vaudeville entertainer	Born in Quincy	
Ireene Wicker		November 24, 1905	November 17, 1987	Actress and singer (The Singing Lady)	Born in Quincy	
Jonathan Van Ness	Image of Jonathan Van Ness in front of a blue background. He has long, straight brown hair and a mustache. He's smiling and is holding his hands in front of his chest.	March 28, 1987		Hairdresser and TV Personality (Queer Eye (2018 TV series))	First male cheerleader of Quincy Senior High School	

== Crime ==
Name	Imagep	Birth	Death	Known for	Association	Reference
James Earl Ray		March 10, 1928	April 23, 1998	Convicted of the assassination of Martin Luther King Jr.	Raised in Quincy	
James Scott		November 20, 1969		Charged with sabotaging a levee in West Quincy, Missouri during the Great Flood of 1993	Born in Quincy	
Michael Swango		October 21, 1954		Serial killer	Raised in Quincy and attended Quincy Notre Dame High School	

== Fine arts ==
Name	Image	Birth	Death	Known for	Association	Reference
Mike Estabrook		June 4, 1970		Multi-medium artist	Born in Quincy	
Neysa McMein		January 25, 1889	May 12, 1949	Illustrator and portrait painting	Born in Quincy	
John Quidor		January 26, 1801	December 14, 1881	History painting	Lived in Quincy from 1837 to 1851	
Robert S. Roeschlaub		July 6, 1843	October 25, 1923	Architect	Raised in Quincy	
Michaele Vollbracht		November 17, 1947	June 7, 2018	Illustrator and fashion designer	Raised in Quincy	

== Journalism and writing ==
- Harriet Bates (1856-1886), poet and novelist
- Ernest Hemmings, founder of the popular Hemmings Motor News magazine
- Rick Hummel, Hall of Fame baseball writer
- Thomas A. Oakley, CEO and chairman of Quincy Newspapers
- Arthur Pitney, inventor of the postage meter
- Jean Rabe, author
- James B. Stewart, author

== Military ==
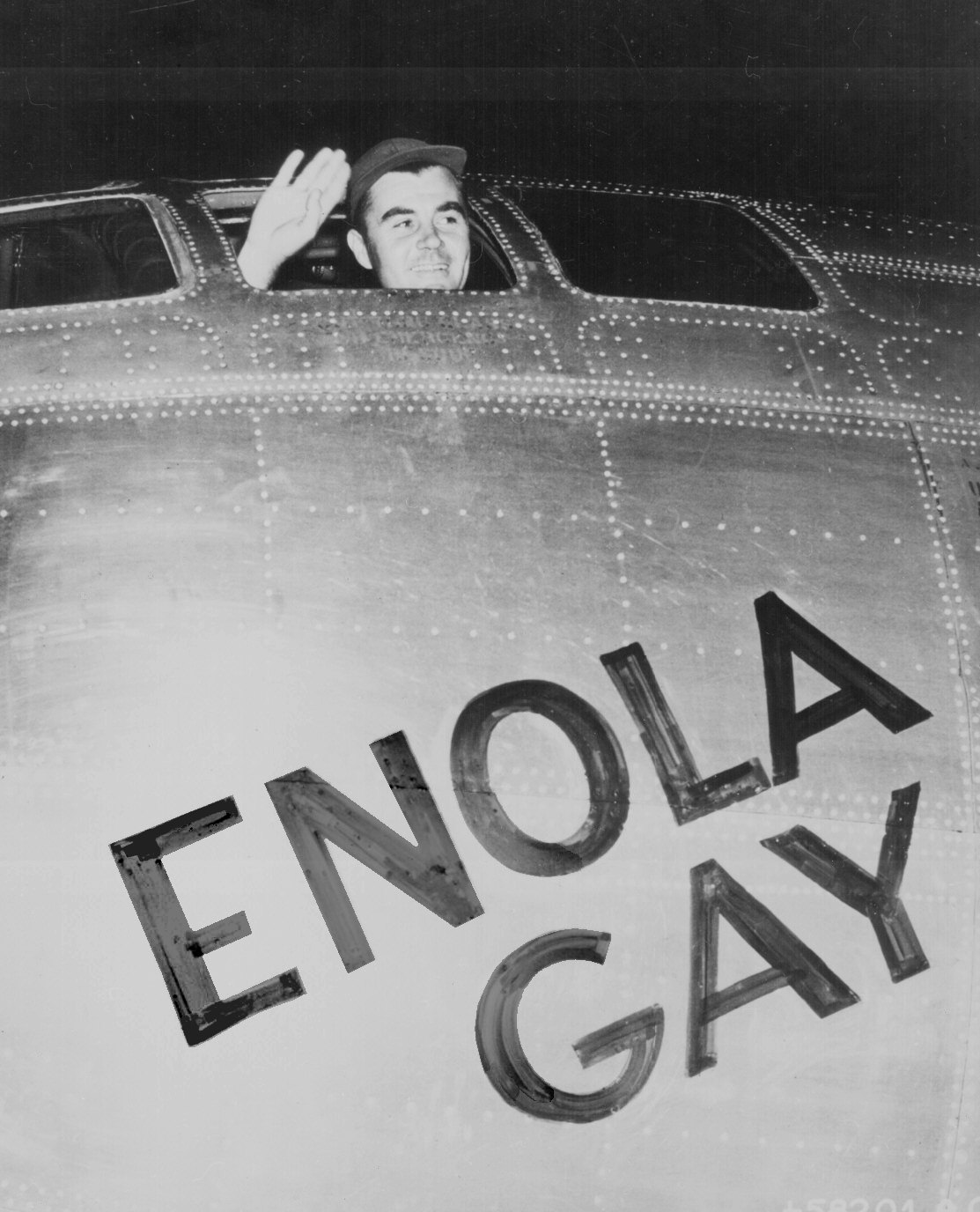
Paul Tibbets waving from the Enola Gay

- Thomas Scott Baldwin, US Army major during World War I; aviation pioneer and balloonist
- Albert Cashier, Union Army soldier during the Civil War
- George J. Iles, Tuskegee Airman and veteran of World War II, the Korean War, and the Vietnam War
- James Dada Morgan, Union Army general during the Civil War
- Benjamin Prentiss, Union Army general during the Civil War
- Scott L. Thoele, US Army National Guard brigadier general
- Paul Tibbets, World War II pilot, Enola Gay

== Music ==
- Ray Burke clarinetist
- Ralph Carmichael, composer
- Micki Free, professional musician
- Tom Goss, musician, born in Quincy
- The Graduate (members Corey Warning and Jared Wuestenberg)
- Bob Havens, jazz musician
- Charlie "Specks" McFadden, country blues singer and songwriter
- Tony Peck, member of the rock band The Forecast

== Politics ==
- A. Otis Arnold, Illinois state legislator and businessman
- Thomas Awerkamp, Illinois State Senator and businessman
- Horace S. Cooley, Illinois Secretary of State
- Laura Kent Donahue, Illinois State Senator
- Stephen Arnold Douglas, youngest supreme court justice in Illinois history (27 years old); ran as a Democrat against Abraham Lincoln in the 1860 election
- Mary Lou Kent, Illinois state legislator
- Frederick Kreismann, mayor of St. Louis
- Charles E. Lippincott, California State Senator and Illinois Auditor
- Benjamin M. Mitchell, state representative, born in Quincy
- Charles E. Morris, state assemblyman for Wisconsin
- Isaac N. Morris, state representative
- Brian Munzlinger, state representative for Missouri
- Mark A. Penick, Illinois state senators
- William Alexander Richardson, U.S. Senator
- Lillian E. Schlagenhauf, Illinois state senator and lawyer
- Onias C. Skinner, Illinois jurist and legislator
- William Rudolph Smith, attorney general of Wisconsin
- Max C. Starkloff (1858-1942), St. Louis Health Commissioner who introduced social distancing during the 1918 flu pandemic
- Art Tenhouse, Illinois state legislator
- William D. Turner, state assemblyman for Wisconsin
- John Wood, city founder and the 12th governor of Illinois

== Religion ==
- Edgar Johnson Goodspeed, theologian and scholar
- Etta Semple, atheist activist
- Father Augustus Tolton, first African-American priest

== Sports ==
- Brian Clark, Canadian football player
- Jack Cornell, professional football player
- Al Demaree, professional baseball player
- Bruce Douglas, basketball player
- Bruce Edwards, major-league baseball catcher
- Jim Finigan, major-league baseball player
- Art Fromme, professional baseball player
- Luke Guthrie, professional golfer
- John W. Henry, principal owner of the Boston Red Sox, the Boston Globe, Liverpool F.C.; co-owner of Roush Fenway Racing
- Chase Hilgenbrinck, former major-league soccer player
- Caren Kemner, Olympic volleyball player
- Dutch Kemner, baseball player
- Nicole Kramer, Olympic swimmer
- Luke Lutenberg, major-league baseball player
- Fritz Ostermueller, major-league baseball player
- Gary Phillips, basketball player
- Josh Rabe, former major-league baseball player
- Paul Reuschel, major-league baseball player
- Rick Reuschel, major-league baseball player
- Ike Samuels, third baseman for the St. Louis Browns
- El Tappe, Chicago Cubs catcher and coach (1961 season)
- F. Morgan Taylor Jr., golfer
- D. A. Weibring, professional golfer
