= Pennick =

Pennick is a surname. Notable people with the surname include:

- Blanche Pennick (1904–1991), American politician
- Jack Pennick (1895–1964), American film actor
- Jeremie Pennick (born 1984), American rapper known professionally as Benny the Butcher
- Ray Pennick (born 1946), English former footballer

== See also ==
- Penick
- Penik (disambiguation)
