= Benjamin Mitchell =

Benjamin Mitchell or Ben Mitchell may refer to:

- Benjamin Grant Mitchell, Australian singer-songwriter, actor and writer
- Ben Mitchell (EastEnders), character from the BBC soap opera EastEnders
- Ben Mitchell (film character), character in the film Wolf Creek
- Ben Mitchell (rugby union) (born 1994), Anglo-Irish rugby union player
- Benjamin Mitchell (actor) (born 1979), actor in New Zealand soap opera Shortland Street
- Benjamin Mitchell (tennis) (born 1992), Australian tennis player
- Benjamin M. Mitchell (1869–1927), American politician
