= Penick =

Penick is a surname. Notable people with the surname include:

- Charles Clifton Penick (1843–1914), American Anglican bishop
- Harvey Penick (1904–1995), American golfer and coach
- John Penick (born 1944), American science educator and scholar
- Mark A. Penick (1906–1952), American lawyer and politician
