= A. Otis Arnold =

American politician

Arvin O. Arnold
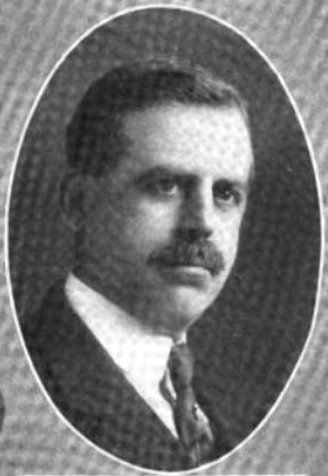

Member of the Illinois Senate
- In office 1940 – September 11, 1941

Member of the Illinois House of Representatives
- In office 1918–1930

Personal details
- Born: Arvin Otis Arnold; January 24, 1878 Bigneck, Illinois, U.S.
- Died: September 11, 1941 (aged 63) Quincy, Illinois, U.S.
- Party: Republican
- Occupation: Businessman, politician

Arvin Otis Arnold (January 24, 1878 – September 11, 1941) was an American businessman and politician.

== Biography ==
Arnold was born near Bigneck, Illinois, He graduated from Maplewood High School in Camp Point, Illinois. He was the owner of the Arnold Printery Company in Quincy, Illinois. Arnold served in the Illinois House of Representatives from 1919 to 1929. He was a Republican. Arnold then served in the Illinois Senate in 1941. He died while still in office. Arnold died at a hospital in Quincy, Illinois after suffering a cerebral hemorrhage while working at his printing plant.
