= Lillian E. Schlagenhauf =

American lawyer and politician

Lillian E. Schlagenhauf (December 9, 1899 – September 13, 1965) was an American lawyer and politician.

Schlagenhauf was born in Quincy, Illinois. She received her bachelor's degree from Northwestern University and her law degree from University of Illinois. Schlagenhauf was admitted to the Illinois bar and practiced law in Quincy, Illinois. She also was an assistant to the Illinois Attorney General. Schlagenhauf served in the Illinois Senate from 1953 to 1965 and was involved with the Republican Party. Schlagenhauf died at Blessing Hospital, in Quincy, Illinois, from complications from abdominal surgery.
