= Eric Brevig =

American film director

- Born: 1957 (age 68–69)
- Occupations: Film director, visual effects supervisor

Eric Brevig (born 1957) is an American film director and visual effects supervisor known for his work in several major theatrical films and television shows. He was Visual Effects Supervisor and Second Unit Director on the 2001 Jerry Bruckheimer/Michael Bay action drama Pearl Harbor, for which he was nominated for the Academy Award for Best Visual Effects.

== Career ==
Since his film school days at UCLA, Brevig had been fascinated with the potential of 3-D for live-action movie production, and he learned everything he could about it. During the production of 1986's Captain EO short for the Disney theme parks he was substantially responsible for supervising the technical aspects of the 3D photography. After several second unit director's assignments in special effects-heavy films like Men in Black and Michael Bay's Pearl Harbor, Brevig's previous 3D experience and expertise turned out to be the factor that helped him get his first full-blown director's job when he was offered the chance to direct the 2008 film Journey to the Center of the Earth 3-D (a New Line Cinema release), the first narrative feature shot entirely in digital 3-D. He next directed Yogi Bear, another 3D movie, for Warner Bros. Following that, he was chosen to direct a 3-D Korean War drama, 17 Days of Winter, about the 1950 Battle of Chosin Reservoir. The film, with a screenplay by Frank Pierson and a budget of US$100 million, was scheduled to begin shooting in South Korea in late 2011, with a target release date in 2013, but it did not move forward.

== Awards ==
Brevig shared a Special Achievement Oscar from the Academy of Motion Picture Arts and Sciences with Rob Bottin, Tim McGovern and Alex Funke for their work on Total Recall, awarded at the 1991 Oscars ceremony. He was nominated in both 1992 and 2002 for the Oscar in Best Effects, Visual Effects.

== Filmography ==
Director

- Journey to the Center of the Earth (2008)
- Yogi Bear (2010)

Visual Effects

- The Man Who Wasn't There (1983)
- D.A.R.Y.L. (1985)
- Stewardess School (1986)
- Captain EO (1986)
- House II: The Second Story (1987)
- The Lost Boys (1987)
- The Seventh Sign (1988)
- Big Business (1988)
- Earth Girls Are Easy (1988)
- Scrooged (1988)
- The Abyss (1989)
- Total Recall (1990)
- Hook (1991)
- The Nutcracker (1993)
- Wolf (1994)
- Honey, I Shrunk the Audience (1994)
- Disclosure (1994)
- The Indian in the Cupboard (1995)
- Men in Black (1997)
- Snake Eyes (1998)
- Wild Wild West (1999)
- Pearl Harbor (2001)
- K-19: The Widowmaker (2002)
- Signs (2002)
- The Hunted (2003)
- Peter Pan (2003)
- Twisted (2004)
- The Day After Tomorrow (2004)
- The Village (2004)
- The Island (2005)
- John Carter (2012)
- The Maze Runner (2014)

Second Unit Director

- The Indian in the Cupboard (1995)
- Men in Black (1997)
- Wild Wild West (1999)
- Pearl Harbor (2001)
- The Island (2005)
- John Carter (2012)

Special Thanks

- Vincent (1982)
- The Final Destination (2009)
