= William Sandell =

American art director

- Born: August 9, 1950 (age 75); Los Angeles, California, U.S.
- Other name: Bill Sandell
- Occupation: Art director
- Years active: 1973–present

William Sandell (born August 9, 1950) is an American art director who was nominated at the 76th Academy Awards for his work on the film Master and Commander: The Far Side of the World in the category of Best Art Direction. He shared his nomination with Robert Gould.

He got his start on B-Movies such as Invasion of the Bee Girls.

In 2020 after regular appearances on Combat Radio, William launched his own radio show and podcast on Brigade-Radio-One called Art Scenic with Ethan Dettenmaier.

== Selected filmography ==
- Invasion of the Bee Girls (1973)
- Mean Streets (1973)
- Big Bad Mama (1974)
- Truck Turner (1974)
- Checkered Flag or Crash (1977)
- Fast Charlie... the Moonbeam Rider (1979)
- Airplane II: The Sequel (1982)
- RoboCop (1987)
- Total Recall (1990)
- Newsies (1992)
- Hocus Pocus (1993)
- The Flintstones (1994)
- Air Force One (1997)
- The Perfect Storm (2000)
- Master and Commander: The Far Side of the World (2003)
- Poseidon (2006)
- Hotel for Dogs (2009)
