= Dream Quest Images =

Former American visual effects company

- Industry: Visual effects
- Founded: 1979
- Defunct: 2001
- Headquarters: Culver City, California (1982–1989); Simi Valley, California (1989–2000); Burbank, California (2000–2001)
- Key people: Hoyt Yeatman, Fred Iguchi, Tom Hollister
- Divisions: DQ Films

Dream Quest Images, later known as The Secret Lab, was an American visual effects company, co-founded in 1979 by Hoyt Yeatman, Scott Squires, Ohio native Rocco Gioffre, Fred Iguchi, Tom Hollister and Bob Hollister.

== History ==
After early piecemeal work on Escape from New York, E.T. the Extra-Terrestrial, and One From the Heart, Dream Quest expanded operations and earned back-to-back visual effects Oscars for work on The Abyss and Total Recall.

In 1996, Dream Quest was purchased by The Walt Disney Company. While Disney began development on Dinosaur, they decided to fold Dream Quest into Walt Disney Feature Animation and subsequently renamed it "The Secret Lab" in 1999.

After The Secret Lab did the visuals of the 2000 animated film Dinosaur, a shuttering process begun, started by cancelling the animated film the studio was doing with Walt Disney Feature Animation, Wildlife. The Secret Lab closed its doors in 2001, but it only shut down once its artists finished their work on Reign of Fire and Kangaroo Jack.

== Dream Quest selected filmography ==
Year	Films
1981	Evilspeak; Escape from New York
1982	One from the Heart; Blade Runner; E.T. the Extra-Terrestrial
1983	V (TV miniseries); Twilight Zone: The Movie; National Lampoon's Vacation; Deal of the Century
1984	V: The Final Battle (TV miniseries); Gremlins; Best Defense; The Adventures of Buckaroo Banzai Across the 8th Dimension; Dreamscape; The Ratings Game
1985	The Stuff; D.A.R.Y.L.; Pee-wee's Big Adventure; National Lampoon's European Vacation; Better Off Dead; Amazing Stories (TV episodes 1-23)
1986	House; Short Circuit; Captain EO (Disney theme park film)
1987	A Nightmare on Elm Street 3: Dream Warriors; House II: The Second Story; Predator; The Lost Boys; Real Men; The Hidden
1988	The Blob; A Nightmare on Elm Street 4: The Dream Master; Earth Girls Are Easy; Moonwalker; Scrooged; Phantasm II
1989	Warlock; The Abyss; Fat Man and Little Boy; National Lampoon's Christmas Vacation
1990	The Exorcist III; Total Recall
1991	Defending Your Life; Hot Shots!; Freddy's Dead: The Final Nightmare; Grand Canyon
1992	Freejack; Final Analysis; Hero; Toys
1993	Robin Hood: Men in Tights; The Three Musketeers; The Abyss (1993 Special Edition)
1994	The Crow; Wyatt Earp; Little Big League; The Mask; Earth 2; The Swan Princess; The Bible: Jacob (TV miniseries, TNT) ("Jacob's Ladder" segment)
1995	Crimson Tide; Waterworld; Dr. Jekyll and Ms. Hyde; Dracula: Dead and Loving It; JAG (TV series); The Bible: Moses (TV miniseries, TNT) ("burning bush", "snakes in Pharaoh's palace", "plagues of Egypt" and "crossing the Red Sea" segments)
1996	Shaughnessy (television film); Alien Nation: Millennium (television film); Primal Fear; Heaven's Prisoners; The Arrival; The Rock; Rolling Thunder
1997	Jungle 2 Jungle; Honey, We Shrunk Ourselves; Con Air; George Of The Jungle; Flubber; Kundun
1998	Deep Rising; Six Days and Seven Nights; Armageddon; Mighty Joe Young
1999	My Favorite Martian; Instinct; Inspector Gadget; The Sixth Sense; Stigmata; Bicentennial Man
2000	Mission to Mars; Dinosaur (First animated film; credited as The Secret Lab); Shanghai Noon; 102 Dalmatians
2001	Planet of the Apes
2002	Reign of Fire
2003	Kangaroo Jack

== See also ==
- Animation studios owned by The Walt Disney Company
