= Tim McGovern =

American visual effects artist (1955–2024)

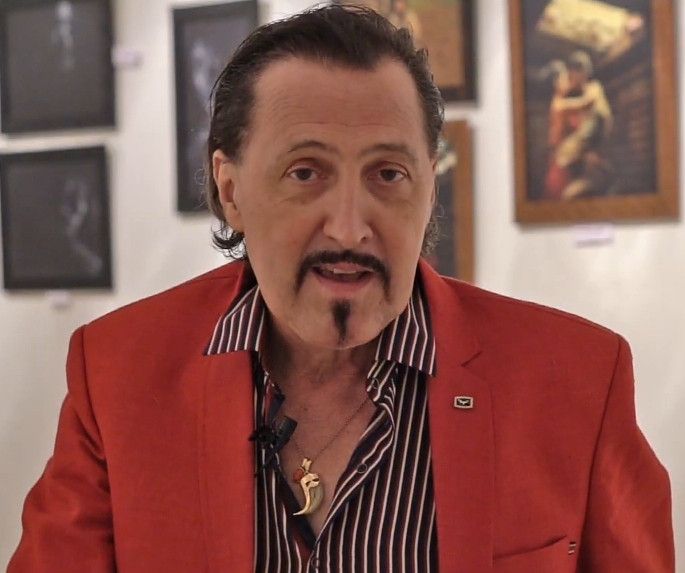
- McGovern in 2019
- Born: June 24, 1955; Chicago, Illinois, U.S.
- Died: March 30, 2024 (aged 68)
- Occupation: Visual effects artist
- Spouse: Reena NeGandhi

Tim McGovern (June 24, 1955 – March 30, 2024) was an American visual effects artist. He won a Special Achievement Academy Award in the category Best Visual Effects for the film Total Recall.

== Life and career ==
McGovern was born in Chicago, Illinois, on June 24, 1955. He was a founding member of Sony Pictures Imageworks. McGovern died on March 30, 2024, at age 68.

At the 97th Academy Awards, his name was mentioned in the In Memoriam section.

== Selected filmography ==
- Total Recall (1990; co-won the Special Achievement Academy Award with Eric Brevig, Rob Bottin and Alex Funke)
