= Penik =

Penik may refer to:

- Artin Penik (1921-1982), Turkish protester
- Penik, Iran, a village in Khuzestan Province, Iran
