= Mark A. Penick =

American politician and lawyer

Mark Albert Penick (July 17, 1895 – September 13, 1952) was an American politician and lawyer.

Penick was born in Pike County, Illinois. He went to the Quincy, Illinois public schools. Penick served as a pilot in the United States Army Air Forces during World War I. He went to Dartmouth College. Penick received his bachelor's and law degrees from University of Chicago. He lived in Quincy, Illinois with his family and practice law in Quincy. Penick served as an assistant state's attorney and as the Quincy state attorney. He served on the Quincy School Board. Penick served in the Illinois Senate from 1933 to 1937 and was a Democrat. Penick died at St. Mary's Hospital in Quincy, Illinois after suffering a stroke.
