= Benjamin M. Mitchell =

American politician (1869–1927)

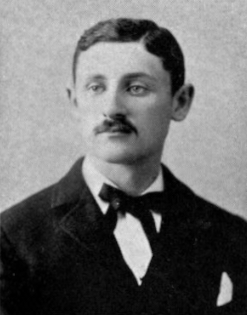
Benjamin M. Mitchell

Benjamin M. Mitchell (January 30, 1869 – March 11, 1927) was an American politician from Illinois.

== Biography ==
Born in Quincy, Illinois, Mitchell moved with his parents to Chicago, Illinois when he was less one year old and where he lived since then. Mitchell worked in the iron and steel business and was a Democrat. He served in the Illinois House of Representatives in 1897, 1901 to 1907, 1911 to 1915, 1919, and 1923 until his death in 1927. In 1922, Mitchell was indicted in United States Federal Court for conspiracy to violate prohibition laws; however, the case was dismissed by U.S. District Court judge James Herbert Wilkerson. Mitchell died in a hospital in Evanston, Illinois after surgery for a hernia.
