= List of accolades received by The Lord of the Rings film series =

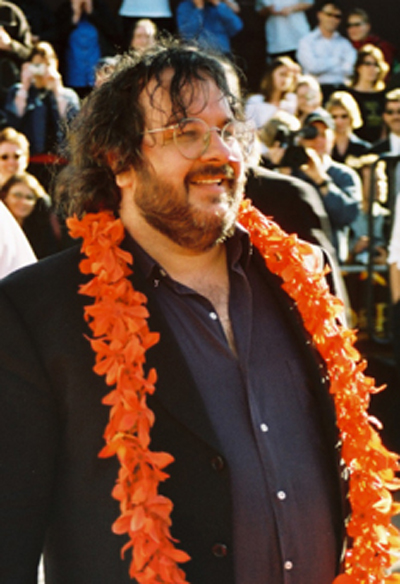
- Peter Jackson (pictured at the final film's world premiere in Wellington) directed all three films of the trilogy.
Awards and nominations
Award	Wins	Nominations
Academy Award	17	30
African-American Film Critics	1	1
Alexandria Awards	14	41
Amanda Award	1	3
American Cinema Editors	1	3
American Film Institute Award	5	6
American Society of Cinematographers	0	2
Art Directors Guild	2	3
ASCAP Film and Television Music Award	3	3
Angel Awards	1	1
AOL Moviegoer Awards	11	11
Australian Academy of Cinema and Television Arts	3	3
Award Circuit Community	22	30
Award Of The Japanese Academy	0	3
Bodil Awards	1	2
Bogey Awards	3	3
Bram Stoker Awards	0	1
British Academy Film Award	13	35
British Society of Cinematographers	0	3
Broadcast Film Critics Association Award	8	11
Bubakar Awards	3	10
Central Ohio Film Critics	2	2
Chicago Film Critics	5	15
Cinema Audio Society Award	1	3
Cinemarati Awards	11	24
Cinema Writer Circle Spain	0	1
Costume Designers Guild	1	2
Chlotrudis Awards	2	2
Czech Lion	0	1
Dallas-Fort Worth Film Critics	5	5
Directors Guild of America Award	1	3
Directors Guild of Great Britain Award	1	1
DVD Exclusive Awards	9	21
Empire Award	7	23
Film Critics Circle of Australia	0	1
Florida Film Critics	5	5
Gabon National Honor Of Merit Awards	1	1
German Dubbing Awards	1	1
Golden Globe Award	4	10
Gold Spirit Awards	18	22
Golden Trailer Award	2	2
Golden Tommatoes Award	2	2
Grammy Award	4	5
Hollywood Makeup Artist and Hair Stylist Guild Award	5	6
Hugo Award	3	3
Iowa Film Critics	1	1
International Online 3-D Society Awards	1	1
International Online Cinephile Society	4	4
Internet Movie Awards	16	16
Irish Film and Television Award	1	1
Italian online movie Award	13	25
Italian Syndicate Of Film Journalists	1	1
jupiter movie Award	4	4
Joblo Awards	26	29
Kansas City Film Critics	5	5
Key Art Awards	1	1
Las Vegas Film Critics	18	22
locus Award	3	3
London Film Critics	0	3
Los Angeles Film Critics	3	3
Motion Picture Sound Editors	1	6
Movieguide Awards	1	1
MTV Movie Award	8	12
National Board of Review	4	4
National Society of Film Critics	0	3
Nebula Award	3	3
New York Film Critics	1	1
NRJ cine cine awards	2	2
Online Film Critics	15	30
Online Film And Television Association	37	61
People's Choice Award	3	3
Phoenix Film Critics	27	37
Producers Guild of America	1	3
Robert Award	1	1
Rondo Hotton Classic Horror Award	2	2
San Diego Film Critics	2	2
San Francisco Film Critics	1	1
Santa Barbara International Film Festival	1	1
Satellite Award	6	27
Saturn Award	15	32
Screen Actors Guild	2	4
Seattle Film Critics	2	12
SFX Awards	6	8
Southeastern Film Critics	4	4
Spacey Awards	5	5
Toronto Film Critics	2	3
Utah Film Critics	3	6
USC Scripter Award	0	3
Vancouver Film Critics	1	2
Visual Effects Society	12	17
Washington D.C. Area Film Critics	2	4
World Soundtrack Award	2	5
Writers Guild of America	0	2
Young Artist Award	2	3

Totals (Note: Certain award groups do not simply award one winner. They acknowledge several different recipients, have runners-up, and have third place. Since this is a specific recognition and is different from losing an award, runner-up mentions are considered wins in this award tally. For simplification and to avoid errors, each award in this list has been presumed to have had a prior nomination.)
- Wins: 475
- Nominations: 800

The Lord of the Rings is a film series of three epic fantasy adventure films directed by Peter Jackson. The films, subtitled The Fellowship of the Ring, The Two Towers, and The Return of the King, were released serially worldwide between December 2001 and December 2003. They are based on J. R. R. Tolkien's epic fantasy novel, The Lord of the Rings, adapted for the screen by Jackson, Fran Walsh, and Philippa Boyens. Set in Tolkien's fictional Middle-earth, the plot follows the hobbit Frodo Baggins and his fellow members of the Fellowship of the Ring as they embark on a quest to destroy the One Ring, which will rid Middle-earth of the Dark Lord Sauron. A large ensemble cast was featured in the series, which included Elijah Wood, Ian McKellen, Viggo Mortensen, Sean Astin, Orlando Bloom, Liv Tyler, John Rhys-Davies, Sean Bean, Billy Boyd, Dominic Monaghan, Andy Serkis, Cate Blanchett, Christopher Lee, Hugo Weaving, Ian Holm, John Noble, Bernard Hill, David Wenham, Miranda Otto, Karl Urban, Craig Parker, Marton Csokas, and Brad Dourif.

All three films premiered to widespread critical acclaim. The Toronto Film Critics Association awarded Jackson a "Special Citation" for his work on the series as a whole, while the Austin Film Critics Association selected the entire series as the decade's third best film. The films won seventeen out of thirty Academy Award nominations, and The Return of the King holds the record for most Oscars with eleven alongside Titanic and Ben-Hur. The Return of the King also has the distinction of being the only fantasy film until The Shape of Water (2017) to have won the Academy Award for Best Picture.

In addition to receiving the Screen Actors Guild Award for Outstanding Performance by a Cast in a Motion Picture and National Board of Review Award for Best Cast, many of the actors were also recognized for their individual work, including McKellen (12 nominations), Serkis (10 nominations), Astin (9 nominations), and Mortensen (5 nominations). Composer Howard Shore received recognition for his original score, as he was the recipient of three Academy Awards, two BAFTA nominations, and three Grammy Awards in addition to a number of other awards. The series also received accolades in various technical categories, including those in editing, sound mixing, and visual effects. Walsh, Boyens, and Jackson's screenwriting earned them 10 awards out of 23 total nominations, including the Academy Award for Best Adapted Screenplay (for The Return of the King). In total, the series received 475 awards out of 800 nominations, thus making the films the most awarded film series in cinematic history.

== The Fellowship of the Ring ==
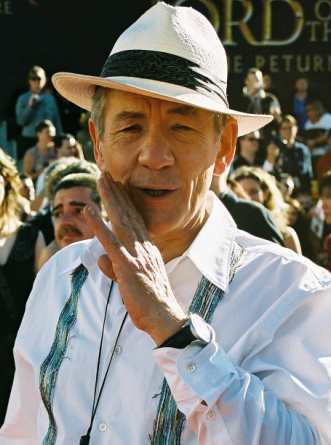
For the first film, Ian McKellen received seven individual nominations for his role as the wizard Gandalf, including the Academy Award for Best Supporting Actor.

The Lord of the Rings: The Fellowship of the Ring was released in theatres worldwide on 19 December 2001. Faced with a production budget of $93 million, the first film earned a worldwide gross of $871,530,324. As in the rest of the series, The Fellowship of the Ring had a large ensemble cast, introducing Elijah Wood, Ian McKellen, Viggo Mortensen, Sean Astin, Orlando Bloom, Liv Tyler, John Rhys-Davies, Sean Bean, Billy Boyd, Dominic Monaghan, Cate Blanchett, Christopher Lee, Hugo Weaving, Ian Holm, and Andy Serkis. The first film's plot follows Frodo Baggins (Wood) and the rest of the Fellowship of the Ring as they begin their journey to destroy the One Ring and defeat the Dark Lord Sauron once and for all.

According to film site aggregator Rotten Tomatoes, 91 percent of critics were favourable about The Fellowship of the Ring. Entertainment Weekly columnist Lisa Schwarzbaum called the film "thrilling – a great picture, a triumphant picture, a joyfully conceived work of cinema that (based on this first installment, with two more ready for release in the next two years) would appear to embrace Tolkien's classic with love and delight, and rewards both adepts and novices with the highest compliment of all: an intelligence and artistry as a movie independent of blind fidelity to the page." Nev Pierce of BBC added, "Funny, scary and, totally involving, Peter Jackson's assured adaptation of J. R. R Tolkien's The Lord of the Rings turns the book's least screen-worthy volume into a gripping and powerful adventure movie."

The Fellowship of the Ring received thirteen Academy Award nominations, winning in four categories. It also earned thirteen nominations at the 55th British Academy Film Awards, leading to wins in the categories for Best Film, Best Direction, Best Special Visual Effects, and the Orange Film of the Year Award. Other notable ceremonies where it received much recognition included the American Film Institute Awards, the Broadcast Film Critics Association Awards, the Empire Awards, the Golden Globes, the MTV Movie Awards, the Satellite Awards, and Saturn Awards. Various critics groups, such as those in Chicago and Phoenix also awarded the film. In total, The Fellowship of the Ring received 98 awards out of 152 nominations.

Organization	Award category	Recipients	Result
Academy Awards	Best Picture	Peter Jackson, Barrie M. Osborne and Fran Walsh	Nominated
Academy Awards	Best Director	Peter Jackson	Nominated
Academy Awards	Best Supporting Actor	Ian McKellen	Nominated
Academy Awards	Best Adapted Screenplay	Fran Walsh, Philippa Boyens and Peter Jackson	Nominated
Academy Awards	Best Art Direction	Art Direction: Grant Major; Set Decoration: Dan Hennah	Nominated
Academy Awards	Best Cinematography	Andrew Lesnie	Won
Academy Awards	Best Costume Design	Ngila Dickson and Richard Taylor	Nominated
Academy Awards	Best Film Editing	John Gilbert	Nominated
Academy Awards	Best Makeup	Peter Owen and Richard Taylor	Won
Academy Awards	Best Original Score	Howard Shore	Won
Academy Awards	Best Original Song	Enya, Nicky Ryan and Roma Ryan; For the song "May It Be"	Nominated
Academy Awards	Best Sound	Christopher Boyes, Michael Semanick, Gethin Creagh and Hammond Peek	Nominated
Academy Awards	Best Visual Effects	Jim Rygiel, Randall William Cook, Richard Taylor and Mark Stetson	Won
Amanda Awards	Best Foreign Feature Film	Peter Jackson	Nominated
American Cinema Editors	Best Edited Film – Drama	John Gilbert	Nominated
American Film Institute Awards	Movie of the Year	Peter Jackson, Barrie Osborne, Tim Sanders, and Fran Walsh	Won
American Film Institute Awards	Composer of the Year	Howard Shore	Nominated
American Film Institute Awards	Digital Effects Artist of the Year	Jim Rygiel	Won
American Film Institute Awards	Production Designer of the Year	Grant Major	Won
American Society of Cinematographers	Outstanding Cinematography – Theatrical Releases	Andrew Lesnie	Nominated
Art Directors Guild	Excellence in Production Design – Fantasy or Period Film		Nominated
ASCAP Film and Television Music Awards	Top Box Office Films	Howard Shore	Won
Australian Academy of Cinema and Television Arts	Best Foreign Film	Barrie Osborne, Peter Jackson, Fran Walsh, and Tim Sanders	Won
Bodil Awards	Best American Film	Peter Jackson	Won
Boston Society of Film Critics	Best Picture		Runner-up
Boston Society of Film Critics	Best Director	Peter Jackson	Runner-up
Bram Stoker Awards	Best Screenplay	Philippa Boyens, Peter Jackson, and Frances Walsh (based on the novel by J. R. R. Tolkien)	Nominated
British Academy Film Awards	Best Film	Peter Jackson, Barrie Osborne, Fran Walsh, and Tim Sanders	Won
British Academy Film Awards	Best Director	Peter Jackson	Won
British Academy Film Awards	Best Screenplay – Adapted	Philippa Boyens, Peter Jackson, and Fran Walsh	Nominated
British Academy Film Awards	Best Actor in a Leading Role	Ian McKellen	Nominated
British Academy Film Awards	Best Cinematography	Andrew Lesnie	Nominated
British Academy Film Awards	Best Costume Design	Ngila Dickson and Richard Taylor	Nominated
British Academy Film Awards	Best Editing	John Gilbert	Nominated
British Academy Film Awards	Film Music	Howard Shore	Nominated
British Academy Film Awards	Best Makeup and Hair	Peter King, Peter Owen, and Richard Taylor	Won
British Academy Film Awards	Best Production Design	Grant Major	Nominated
British Academy Film Awards	Best Sound	Christopher Boyes, Gethin Creagh, David Farmer, Mike Hopkins, Hammond Peek, Michael Semanick, and Ethan Van der Ryn	Nominated
British Academy Film Awards	Best Visual Effects	Randall William Cook, Alex Funke, Jim Rygiel, Mark Stetson, and Richard Taylor	Won
British Academy Film Awards	Orange Film of the Year Award		Won
British Society of Cinematographers	Best Cinematography	Andrew Lesnie	Nominated
Broadcast Film Critics	Best Film		Nominated
Broadcast Film Critics	Best Director	Peter Jackson	Nominated
Broadcast Film Critics	Best Composer	Howard Shore	Won
Broadcast Film Critics	Best Song	Enya, for the song "May It Be"; Tied with "Vanilla Sky" by Paul McCartney	Won
Chicago Film Critics	Best Film		Nominated
Chicago Film Critics	Best Director	Peter Jackson	Nominated
Chicago Film Critics	Best Cinematography	Andrew Lesnie	Won
Chicago Film Critics	Best Original Score	Howard Shore	Won
Cinema Audio Society	Outstanding Sound Mixing – Motion Pictures	Christopher Boyes, Gethin Creagh, Hammond Peek and Michael Semanick	Won
Dallas-Fort Worth Film Critics	Best Cinematography	Andrew Lesnie	Won
Directors Guild of America	Outstanding Directing – Motion Picture	Peter Jackson	Nominated
Empire Awards	Best Film		Won
Empire Awards	Best Director	Peter Jackson	Nominated
Empire Awards	Best Actor	Viggo Mortensen	Nominated
Empire Awards	Best Actor	Elijah Wood	Won
Empire Awards	Best British Actor	Sean Bean	Nominated
Empire Awards	Best British Actor	Ian McKellen	Nominated
Empire Awards	Best Debut	Orlando Bloom	Won
Empire Awards	Best Debut	Billy Boyd and Dominic Monaghan	Nominated
Florida Film Critics	Best Director	Peter Jackson	Won
Florida Film Critics	Best Supporting Actress	Cate Blanchett	Won
Golden Globe Awards	Best Film – Drama		Nominated
Golden Globe Awards	Best Director	Peter Jackson	Nominated
Golden Globe Awards	Best Original Score	Howard Shore	Nominated
Golden Globe Awards	Best Original Song	Enya; For the song "May It Be"	Nominated
Golden Tomatoes Awards	Best Film	Peter Jackson, Fran Walsh, Barrie M.Osborne	Won
Grammy Awards	Best Score Soundtrack Album – Motion Picture, Television or Other Visual Media	John Kurlander and Howard Shore	Won
Grammy Awards	Best Song – Motion Picture, Television or Other Visual Media	Enya, Nicky Ryan, and Roma Ryan; For the song "May It Be"	Nominated
Heartland Film Festival	Truly Moving Picture Award		Won
Hugo Awards	Best Dramatic Presentation		Won
Jupiter Awards	Best International Film	Peter Jackson	Won
Jupiter Awards	Best International Director	Peter Jackson	Won
Locus Awards	Best Script	Fran Walsh, Philippa Boyens, and Peter Jackson	Won
Los Angeles Film Critics	Best Music Score	Howard Shore	Won
Motion Picture Sound Editors	Best Sound Editing – Foreign Film	Mike Hopkins, Ethan Van der Ryan, David Farmer, Brent Burge, John McKay, Timothy Nielsen, Craig Tomlinson, Dave Whitehead, Jason Canovas, Ray Beentjes, and Chris Todd	Nominated
Motion Picture Sound Editors	Best Sound Editing – Music – Feature Film, Domestic and Foreign	Suzana Peric, Nancy Allen, Michael Price, and Andrew Dudman	Won
MTV Movie Awards	Best Movie		Won
MTV Movie Awards	Best Action Sequence	"The Cave Tomb Battle"	Nominated
MTV Movie Awards	Best Breakthrough Performance	Orlando Bloom	Won
MTV Movie Awards	Best Fight	Christopher Lee vs. Ian McKellen	Nominated
MTV Movie Awards	Best Male Performance	Elijah Wood	Nominated
MTV Movie Awards	Best Villain	Christopher Lee	Nominated
National Board of Review	Best Supporting Actress	Cate Blanchett	Won
National Board of Review	Outstanding Production Design	Grant Major	Won
National Board of Review	Special Filmmaking Award	Peter Jackson	Won
National Society of Film Critics	Best Film		Runner-up
National Society of Film Critics	Best Director	Peter Jackson	Runner-up
Nebula Awards	Best Script	Frances Walsh, Phillipa Boyens, and Peter Jackson	Won
Online Film Critics	Best Picture		Nominated
Online Film Critics	Best Director	Peter Jackson	Nominated
Online Film Critics	Best Adapted Screenplay	Philippa Boyens, Peter Jackson, and Frances Walsh	Nominated
Online Film Critics	Best Supporting Actor	Ian McKellen	Nominated
Online Film Critics	Best Cinematography	Andrew Lesnie	Nominated
Online Film Critics	Best Cast		Nominated
Online Film Critics	Best Original Score	Howard Shore	Nominated
People's Choice Awards	Favorite Dramatic Motion Picture; Tied with Spider-Man		Won
People's Choice Awards	Favorite Motion Picture		Won
Producers Guild of America	Motion Picture Producer of the Year Award	Barrie M. Osborne, Peter Jackson, and Fran Walsh	Nominated
Robert Awards	Best American Film	Peter Jackson	Won
Satellite Awards	Best Motion Picture, Animated or Mixed Media		Won
Satellite Awards	Best Screenplay, Adapted	Fran Walsh, Philippa Boyens, and Peter Jackson	Nominated
Satellite Awards	Best Art Director & Production Design	Grant Major and Dan Hennah	Nominated
Satellite Awards	Best Cinematography	Andrew Lesnie	Nominated
Satellite Awards	Best Costume Design	Ngila Dickson and Richard Taylor	Nominated
Satellite Awards	Best Film Editing	John Gilbert	Won
Satellite Awards	Best Sound (Mixing & Editing)	Gethin Creagh, Christopher Boyes, Michael Semanick, and Hammond Peek	Won
Satellite Awards	Best Supporting Actor, Drama	Ian McKellen	Nominated
Satellite Awards	Best Visual Effects	Jim Rygiel, Richard Taylor, Alex Funke, and Randall William Cook	Won
Saturn Awards	Best Fantasy Film		Won
Saturn Awards	Best Director	Peter Jackson	Won
Saturn Awards	Best Screenplay	Fran Walsh, Philippa Boyens, and Peter Jackson	Nominated
Saturn Awards	Best Supporting Actor	Ian McKellen	Won
Saturn Awards	Best Costumes	Ngila Dickson and Richard Taylor	Nominated
Saturn Awards	Face of the Future – Male	Orlando Bloom	Nominated
Saturn Awards	Best Makeup	Peter Owen and Richard Taylor	Nominated
Saturn Awards	Best Score	Howard Shore	Nominated
Saturn Awards	Best Special Effects	Jim Rygiel, Randall William Cook, Richard Taylor, and Mark Stetson	Nominated
Screen Actors Guild	Outstanding Actor in a Supporting Role	Ian McKellen	Won
Screen Actors Guild	Outstanding Cast – Motion Picture	Sean Astin, Sean Bean, Cate Blanchett, Orlando Bloom, Billy Boyd, Marton Csokas, Ian Holm, Christopher Lee, Ian McKellen, Dominic Monaghan, Viggo Mortensen, Craig Parker, John Rhys-Davies, Andy Serkis, Liv Tyler, Hugo Weaving, and Elijah Wood	Nominated
Toronto Film Critics	Best Director	Peter Jackson	Nominated
Toronto Film Critics	Best Supporting Actor	Ian McKellen	Nominated
USC Scripter Awards	USC Scripter Award	Frances Walsh, Philippa Boyens, and Peter Jackson	Nominated
World Soundtrack Awards	Composer of the Year	Howard Shore	Nominated
World Soundtrack Awards	Best Original Soundtrack of the Year – Orchestral	Howard Shore	Won
World Soundtrack Awards	Public Choice Award	Howard Shore	Won
Writers Guild of America	Best Screenplay – Adapted	Philippa Boyens, Peter Jackson, and Fran Walsh	Nominated
Young Artist Awards	Best Family Feature Film – Drama		Nominated

== The Two Towers ==
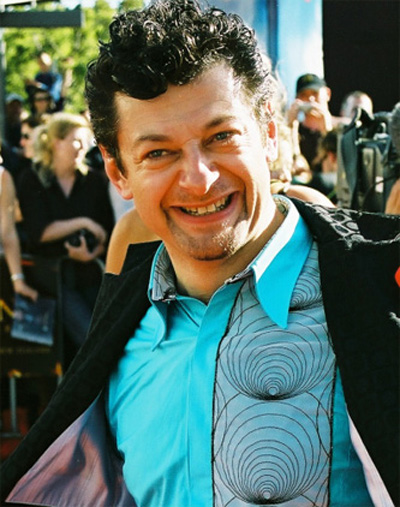
Andy Serkis received three awards for his performance as Gollum, including the Saturn Award for Best Supporting Actor.

The worldwide theatrical release of The Lord of the Rings: The Two Towers occurred on 18 December 2002. The series' second film earned a worldwide gross of $926,047,111 based on a production budget of $94 million. The film introduced new characters played by Bernard Hill, Miranda Otto, Karl Urban, David Wenham, and Brad Dourif.

The Two Towers received critical acclaim; film site aggregator Rotten Tomatoes reported that 96 percent of critics were positive. CNN film critic Paul Clinton called The Two Towers an "utter triumph", and writer Philip French of The Guardian noted in a review of the second film that "these Tolkien films have a weight and seriousness that very few sword-and-sorcery pictures of the past 30-odd years have attained." Writing for Entertainment Weekly, Owen Gleiberman remarked "The Two Towers conjures an illusion of the gravity that you want from an emotionally charged storybook epic. Really, though, what it comes down to is superbly staged battle scenes and moral alliances forged in earnest yet purged of the wit and dynamic, bristly ego that define true on-screen personality." The film was also listed on a number of critics' lists; Dallas-Fort Worth Film Critics named The Two Towers 2002's third best film, while Central Ohio Film Critics named The Two Towers that year's fifth best film and Southeastern Film Critics ranked it the eighth.

The Two Towers won two out of six Academy Award nominations and three accolades out of ten nominations at the 56th British Academy Film Awards. Like its predecessor, the second film also received recognition at the American Film Institute Awards, the Broadcast Film Critics Association Awards, the Empire Awards, the Golden Globes, the MTV Movie Awards, the Satellite Awards, and the Saturn Awards. Various critics groups, such as Chicago, Phoenix, and Seattle also awarded the film. In total, The Two Towers received 136 awards out of 222 nominations.

Organization	Award category	Recipients	Result
Academy Awards	Best Picture	Barrie M. Osborne, Fran Walsh and Peter Jackson	Nominated
Academy Awards	Best Art Direction	Art Direction: Grant Major; Set Decoration: Dan Hennah and Alan Lee	Nominated
Academy Awards	Best Film Editing	Michael Horton	Nominated
Academy Awards	Best Sound	Christopher Boyes, Michael Semanick, Michael Hedges and Hammond Peek	Nominated
Academy Awards	Best Sound Editing	Ethan Van der Ryn and Mike Hopkins	Won
Academy Awards	Best Visual Effects	Jim Rygiel, Joe Letteri, Randall William Cook and Alex Funke	Won
Amanda Awards	Best Foreign Feature Film	Peter Jackson	Nominated
American Cinema Editors	Best Edited Film – Drama	Michael Horton	Nominated
American Film Institute Awards	AFI Movies of the Year – Official Selections		Won
ASCAP Film and Television Music Awards	Top Box Office Films	Howard Shore	Won
Art Directors Guild	Excellence in Production Design – Fantasy or Period Film	Grant Major, Dan Hennah, Joe Bleakley, Rob Otterside, Phil Ivey, Mark Robins, Jules Cook, Ross McGarva, Jacqui Allen	Won
Austin Film Critics Association	Top 10 Films of the Decade	The Lord of the Rings Trilogy	Won
Australian Academy of Cinema and Television Arts	Best Foreign Film	Peter Jackson, Barnie M. Osborne, and Fran Walsh	Won
Bogey Awards	Bogey Award In Titanium		Won
British Academy Film Awards	Best Film	Peter Jackson, Barrie Osborne, and Fran Walsh	Nominated
British Academy Film Awards	Best Director	Peter Jackson	Nominated
British Academy Film Awards	Best Cinematography	Andrew Lesnie	Nominated
British Academy Film Awards	Best Costume Design	Ngila Dickson and Richard Taylor	Won
British Academy Film Awards	Best Editing	Michael Horton	Nominated
British Academy Film Awards	Best Make Up & Hair	Peter King, Peter Owen, and Richard Taylor	Nominated
British Academy Film Awards	Best Production Design	Grant Major	Nominated
British Academy Film Awards	Best Sound	Christopher Boyes, David Farmer, Michael Hedges, Michael Hopkins, Hammond Peek, Michael Semanick, and Ethan Van Der Ryn	Nominated
British Academy Film Awards	Best Visual Effects	Randall William Cook, Alex Funke, Joe Letteri, and Jim Rygiel	Won
British Academy Film Awards	Orange Film of the Year Award		Won
British Society of Cinematographers	Best Cinematography	Andrew Lesnie	Nominated
Broadcast Film Critics	Best Picture		Nominated
Broadcast Film Critics	Best Composer	Howard Shore	Won
Broadcast Film Critics	Best Digital Acting Performance	Andy Serkis as Gollum	Won
Chicago Film Critics	Best Picture		Nominated
Chicago Film Critics	Best Director	Peter Jackson	Nominated
Chicago Film Critics	Best Cinematography	Andrew Lesnie	Nominated
Chicago Film Critics	Best Original Score	Howard Shore	Nominated
Cinema Audio Society	Outstanding Sound Mixing – Motion Pictures	Christopher Boyes, Michael Semanick, Michael Hedges, and Hammond Peek	Nominated
Costume Designers Guild	Excellence in Period/Fantasy Film	Ngila Dickson	Nominated
Dallas-Fort Worth Film Critics	Best Picture		Runner-up
Dallas-Fort Worth Film Critics	Best Director	Peter Jackson	Won
Directors Guild of America	Outstanding Directing – Motion Picture	Peter Jackson	Nominated
Empire Awards	Best Actor	Viggo Mortensen	Nominated
Empire Awards	Best British Actor	Andy Serkis	Nominated
Empire Awards	Best British Actor	Ian McKellen	Nominated
Empire Awards	Best Actress	Miranda Otto	Nominated
Empire Awards	Best Director	Peter Jackson	Nominated
Empire Awards	Sony Ericsson Scene of the Year	"Gollum's debate"	Nominated
Empire Awards	Best Film		Won
Golden Globe Awards	Best Picture – Drama		Nominated
Golden Globe Awards	Best Director	Peter Jackson	Nominated
Golden Tomatoes Awards	Best Film		Won
Golden Trailer Awards	Best Action	"The Ant Farm"	Won
Grammy Awards	Best Score Soundtrack Album – Motion Picture, Television or Other Visual Media	Peter Cobbin, John Kurlander, and Howard Shore	Won
Hugo Awards	Best Dramatic Presentation: Long Form		Won
London Film Critics	Director of the Year	Peter Jackson	Nominated
Motion Picture Sound Editors	Best Sound Editing – Foreign Film	Mike Hopkins, Andrew Dudman, Steve Price, Mark Willsher, Malcolm Fife, Nigel Scott, Jonathan Schultz, Rebecca Gatrell, and Raphaël Mouterde	Nominated
Motion Picture Sound Editors	Best Sound Editing – Music – Feature Film, Domestic and Foreign	Mike Hopkins, Ethan Van der Ryn, David Farmer, Brent Burge, Dave Whitehead, John McKay, Kyrsten Mate Comoglio, Craig Tomlinson, Hayden Collow, Jason Canovas, Ray Beentjes, Polly McKinnon, Nigel Stone, and Mark Franken	Nominated
MTV Movie Awards	Best Movie		Won
MTV Movie Awards	Best Action Sequence	"The Battle for Helm's Deep"	Won
MTV Movie Awards	Best Virtual Performance	Gollum	Won
MTV Movie Awards	Best Male Performance	Viggo Mortensen	Nominated
MTV Movie Awards	Best On-Screen Duo	Elijah Wood, Sean Astin, and Gollum	Won
Nebula Awards	Best Script	Frances Walsh, Phillipa Boyens, Stephen Sinclair, and Peter Jackson	Won
Online Film Critics	Best Picture		Won
Online Film Critics	Best Director	Peter Jackson	Won
Online Film Critics	Best Adapted Screenplay	Philippa Boyens, Peter Jackson, and Frances Walsh	Nominated
Online Film Critics	Best Supporting Actor	Andy Serkis	Nominated
Online Film Critics	Best Art Direction		Nominated
Online Film Critics	Best Cast		Won
Online Film Critics	Best Cinematography	Andrew Lesnie	Nominated
Online Film Critics	Best Costume Design		Nominated
Online Film Critics	Best Editing	Michael Horton and Jabez Olssen	Won
Online Film Critics	Best Original Score	Howard Shore	Nominated
Online Film Critics	Best Sound		Won
Online Film Critics	Best Visual Effects		Won
People's Choice Awards	Favorite Dramatic Motion Picture		Won
Producers Guild of America	Motion Picture Producer of the Year Award	Peter Jackson, Barrie Osborne, and Fran Walsh	Nominated
Satellite Awards	Best Picture – Drama		Nominated
Satellite Awards	Best Director	Peter Jackson	Nominated
Satellite Awards	Best Actor in a Supporting Role – Drama	Viggo Mortensen	Nominated
Satellite Awards	Best Cinematography	Andrew Lesnie	Nominated
Satellite Awards	Best Editing	Michael Horton	Nominated
Satellite Awards	Best Screenplay, Adapted	Philippa Boyens, Peter Jackson, Stephen Sinclair, and Fran Walsh	Nominated
Satellite Awards	Best Sound	Christopher Boyes, Michael Hedges, Hammond Peek, and Michael Semanick	Nominated
Satellite Awards	Best Visual Effects	Randall Cook, Alex Funke, Joe Letteri, and Jim Rygiel	Won
Satellite Awards	Best Overall DVD	(for the Special Extended Edition)	Won
Satellite Awards	Best DVD Extras	(for the Special Extended Edition)	Nominated
Saturn Awards	Best Fantasy Film		Won
Saturn Awards	Best Director	Peter Jackson	Nominated
Saturn Awards	Best Actor	Viggo Mortensen	Nominated
Saturn Awards	Best Supporting Actor	Andy Serkis	Won
Saturn Awards	Best Costumes	Ngila Dickson and Richard Taylor	Won
Saturn Awards	Best Makeup	Peter Owen and Peter King	Won
Saturn Awards	Best Music	Howard Shore	Nominated
Saturn Awards	Best Special Effects	Jim Rygiel, Joe Letteri, Randall William Cook, and Alex Funke	Nominated
Saturn Awards	Best Writing	Fran Walsh, Philippa Boyens, Stephen Sinclair, and Peter Jackson	Nominated
Saturn Awards	Best Young Actor	Elijah Wood	Nominated
Screen Actors Guild	Outstanding Cast – Motion Picture	Sean Astin, Sean Bean, Cate Blanchett, Orlando Bloom, Billy Boyd, Brad Dourif, Bernard Hill, Christopher Lee, Ian McKellen, Dominic Monaghan, Viggo Mortensen, John Noble, Miranda Otto, Craig Parker, John Rhys-Davies, Andy Serkis, Liv Tyler, Karl Urban, Hugo Weaving, David Wenham, and Elijah Wood	Nominated
SFX Awards	Best SF Or Fantasy Film		Won
SFX Awards	Best SF Or Fantasy Film Actor	Viggo Mortensen	Won
SFX Awards	Best SF Or Fantasy Film Actor	Ian McKellen	Nominated
SFX Awards	Best SF Or Fantasy Film Actor	Elijah Wood	Nominated
SFX Awards	Best SF Or Fantasy Film Director	Peter Jackson	Won
SFX Awards	Best SF Or Fantasy Film Music	Howard Shore	Won
USC Scripter Awards	USC Scripter Award	Frances Walsh, Philippa Boyens, Stephen Sinclair, and Peter Jackson	Nominated
Spacey Awards	Best Fantasy or Sci-fi Film		Won
Spacey Awards	Best Action Sequence		Won
Visual Effects Society	Best Visual Effects in an Effects Driven Motion Picture	Jim Rygiel, Joe Letteri, Randall William Cook, and Alex Funke	Won
Visual Effects Society	Best Character Animation in a Live Action Motion Picture	Richard Baneham, Eric Saindon, Ken McGaugh, and Bay Raitt	Won
Visual Effects Society	Best Special Effects in a Motion Picture	Steve Ingram, Blair Foord, Rich Cordobes, and Scott Harens	Won
Visual Effects Society	Best Matte Painting in a Motion Picture	Yanick Dusseault, Max Dennison, Roger Kupelian, and Mathieu Raynault	Nominated
Visual Effects Society	Best Models and Miniatures in a Motion Picture	Richard Taylor, Paul Van Ommen, and Matt Aitken	Won
Visual Effects Society	Best Visual Effects Photography in a Motion Picture	Alex Funke, Brian Van't Hul, and Richard Bluck	Won
Visual Effects Society	Best Effects Art Direction in a Motion Picture	Alan Lee, Jeremy Bennett, Christian Rivers, and Gino Acevedo	Won
Visual Effects Society	Best Compositing in a Motion Picture	Mark Lewis, GG Heitmann Demers, Alex Lemke, and Alfred Murrle	Won
Visual Effects Society	Best Performance by an Actor in an Effects Film	Andy Serkis, Elijah Wood, and Sean Astin	Won
Washington D.C. Area Film Critics Association	Best Picture		Runner-up
Washington D.C. Area Film Critics Association	Best Director	Peter Jackson	Runner-up
World Soundtrack Awards	Best Original Song Written for a Film (for "Gollum's Song")	Howard Shore (Composer) Emilíana Torrini (Performer) Fran Walsh, Janet Roddick, David Donaldson, Steve Roche, and David Long (Lyrics)	Nominated
Young Artist Awards	Best Family Feature Film – Drama		Won

== The Return of the King ==
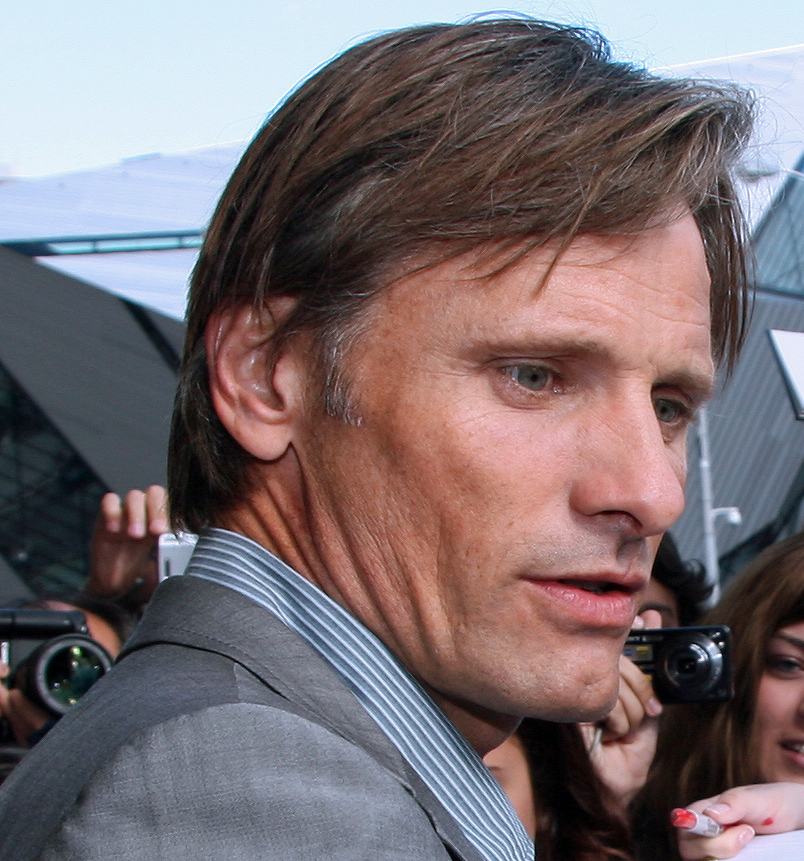
Viggo Mortensen's performance as Aragorn received ten nominations throughout the series.

The worldwide theatrical release of The Lord of the Rings: The Return of the King occurred on 17 December 2003. The series' third film earned a worldwide gross of $1,119,929,521 off a production budget of $94 million and became the second highest worldwide grossing until James Cameron's Avatar released in 2009. In addition to containing most of the cast from the previous two films, The Return of the King introduced Denethor, the Steward of Gondor, played by John Noble (though the character appeared in the extended edition of The Two Towers).

The Return of the King continued the series' critical success, with Rotten Tomatoes reporting that 93% of critics had given the film a positive review. Roger Ebert of the Chicago Sun-Times believed the film to be the best of the three, as it "certifies the Ring trilogy as a work of bold ambition at a time of cinematic timidity." Entertainment Weekly film critic Lisa Schwarzbaum was equally praiseworthy of the final chapter. She explained, "I can't think of another film trilogy that ends in such glory, or another monumental work of sustained storytelling that surges ahead with so much inventiveness and ardor. The conclusion of Peter Jackson's masterwork is passionate and literate, detailed and expansive, and it's conceived with a risk-taking flair for old-fashioned movie magic at its most precious, a rarity now that CGI prowess has fallen into the hands of run-of-the-mill studio ring-chasers." The Guardian's Peter Bradshaw wrote, "With enormous energy and a passionately exacting eye for detail, Jackson has made the regressive-romantic legend live again. He has given the Tolkien myth a turbo-charged rush into the 21st century."

The film won eleven Academy Awards (from eleven nominations), tying Titanic and Ben-Hur for the most Oscars won, as well as setting a new record for the highest clean sweep at the Oscars (which it still holds to this day). The Return of the King also became the first fantasy film to have won the Academy Award for Best Picture. The Return of the King won five BAFTAs, three Empire Awards, four Golden Globes, one Satellite Award, and eight Saturn Awards, among others. In total, the film received 258 awards out of 337 nominations.

Organization	Award category	Recipients	Result
Academy Awards	Best Picture	Peter Jackson, Barrie Osborne and Fran Walsh	Won
Academy Awards	Best Director	Peter Jackson	Won
Academy Awards	Best Adapted Screenplay	Philippa Boyens, Fran Walsh and Peter Jackson	Won
Academy Awards	Best Art Direction	Art Direction: Dan Hennah; Set Decoration: Alan Lee and Grant Major	Won
Academy Awards	Best Costume Design	Ngila Dickson and Richard Taylor	Won
Academy Awards	Best Film Editing	Jamie Selkirk	Won
Academy Awards	Best Makeup	Peter King and Richard Taylor	Won
Academy Awards	Best Original Score	Howard Shore	Won
Academy Awards	Best Original Song	Fran Walsh, Howard Shore and Annie Lennox (for the song "Into the West")	Won
Academy Awards	Best Sound Mixing	Christopher Boyes, Michael Semanick, Michael Hedges and Hammond Peek	Won
Academy Awards	Best Visual Effects	Jim Rygiel, Joe Letteri, Randall William Cook and Alex Funke	Won
African American Film Critics Association	Best Picture		Won
Amanda Awards	Best Foreign Feature Film	Peter Jackson	Won
American Cinema Editors	Best Edited Film – Drama	Jamie Selkirk	Won
American Film Institute Awards	AFI Movies of the Year – Official Selections		Won
American Society of Cinematographers	Outstanding Cinematography – Theatrical Releases	Andrew Lesnie	Nominated
American Society of Cinematographers	Best Cinematography of the Decade	The Lord of the Rings Trilogy	Nominated
Art Directors Guild	Excellence in Production Design – Fantasy or Period Film	Jacqui Allen, Joe Bleakley, Simon Bright, Jules Cook, Dan Hennah, Philip Ivey, Grant Major, and Ross McGarva	Won
ASCAP Film and Television Music Awards	Top Box Office Films	Howard Shore	Won
Austin Film Critics Association	Top 10 Films of the Decade	The Lord of the Rings Trilogy	Won
Australian Academy of Cinema and Television Arts	Best Foreign Film	Peter Jackson, Barnie M. Osborne, and Fran Walsh	Won
Bodil Awards	Best American Film	Peter Jackson	Nominated
Bogey Awards	Bogey Award In Titanium		Won
British Academy Film Awards	Best Film	Barrie M Osborne, Fran Walsh, and Peter Jackson	Won
British Academy Film Awards	Best Director	Peter Jackson	Nominated
British Academy Film Awards	Best Screenplay – Adapted	Fran Walsh, Philippa Boyens, and Peter Jackson	Won
British Academy Film Awards	Best Supporting Actor	Ian McKellen	Nominated
British Academy Film Awards	Best Costume Design	Ngila Dickson and Richard Taylor	Nominated
British Academy Film Awards	Best Cinematography	Andrew Lesnie	Won
British Academy Film Awards	Best Editing	Jamie Selkirk	Nominated
British Academy Film Awards	Film Music	Howard Shore	Nominated
British Academy Film Awards	Best Make Up & Hair	Richard Taylor, Peter King, and Peter Owen	Nominated
British Academy Film Awards	Best Production Design	Grant Major	Nominated
British Academy Film Awards	Best Sound	Ethan Van Der Ryn, Michael Hopkins, David Farmer, Christopher Boyes, Michael Hedges, Michael Semanick, and Hammond Peek	Nominated
British Academy Film Awards	Best Visual Effects	Joe Letteri, Jim Rygiel, Randall William Cook, and Alex Funke	Won
British Academy Film Awards	Orange Film of the Year Award		Won
British Society of Cinematographers	Best Cinematography	Andrew Lesnie	Nominated
Broadcast Film Critics	Best Picture		Won
Broadcast Film Critics	Best Director	Peter Jackson	Won
Broadcast Film Critics	Best Composer	Howard Shore	Won
Broadcast Film Critics	Best Acting Ensemble		Won
Broadcast Film Critics	Favorite Film Franchise	Peter Jackson for "The Lord of the Rings"	Won
Chicago Film Critics	Best Picture		Won
Chicago Film Critics	Best Director	Peter Jackson	Won
Chicago Film Critics	Best Screenplay	Philippa Boyens, Peter Jackson, and Frances Walsh	Nominated
Chicago Film Critics	Best Supporting Actor	Sean Astin	Won
Chicago Film Critics	Best Supporting Actor	Andy Serkis	Nominated
Chicago Film Critics	Best Cinematography	Andrew Lesnie	Nominated
Chicago Film Critics	Best Original Score	Howard Shore	Won
Cinema Audio Society	Outstanding Sound Mixing – Motion Pictures	Christopher Boyes, Michael Semanick, Michael Hedges, and Hammond Peek	Nominated
Costume Designers Guild	Excellence in Period/Fantasy Film	Ngila Dickson	Won
Dallas-Fort Worth Film Critics	Best Film		Won
Dallas-Fort Worth Film Critics	Best Director	Peter Jackson	Won
Dallas-Fort Worth Film Critics	Best Cinematography	Andrew Lesnie	Won
Directors Guild of America	Outstanding Directing – Motion Picture	Peter Jackson	Won
Directors Guild of Great Britain	Outstanding Directing – International Film	Peter Jackson	Won
Empire Awards	Best Film		Won
Empire Awards	Best Director	Peter Jackson	Nominated
Empire Awards	Best Actor	Viggo Mortensen	Nominated
Empire Awards	Best Actor	Sean Astin	Nominated
Empire Awards	Best British Actor	Andy Serkis	Won
Empire Awards	Best British Actor	Ian McKellen	Nominated
Empire Awards	Best British Actor	Orlando Bloom	Nominated
Empire Awards	Sony Ericsson Scene of the Year	"Ride Of The Rohirrim"	Won
Film Critics Circle of Australia	Best Foreign Film – English Language		Nominated
Florida Film Critics	Best Film		Won
Florida Film Critics	Best Director	Peter Jackson	Won
Florida Film Critics	Best Cinematography	Andrew Lesnie	Won
Golden Globe Awards	Best Picture – Drama		Won
Golden Globe Awards	Best Director	Peter Jackson	Won
Golden Globe Awards	Best Original Score	Howard Shore	Won
Golden Globe Awards	Best Original Song	Annie Lennox, Howard Shore and Fran Walsh (for "Into the West")	Won
GoldSpirit Awards	Best Score	Howard Shore	Won
GoldSpirit Awards	Best Composer	Howard Shore	Won
GoldSpirit Awards	Best Sci-Fi/Fantasy Score	Howard Shore	Won
GoldSpirit Awards	best CD Release		Won
GoldSpirit Awards	Best Song	Into The West	Won
GoldSpirit Awards	Best Theme	"Minas Tirith" and "The White Tree"	Won
GoldSpirit Awards	Best Horror Theme	"Shelob's Lair"	Won
GoldSpirit Awards	Best Epic Theme	"Minas Tirith" and "The White Tree"	Won
Golden Trailer Awards	Best Drama	"The Ant Farm"	Won
Grammy Awards	Best Score Soundtrack Album – Motion Picture, Television or Other Visual Media	John Kurlander and Howard Shore	Won
Grammy Awards	Best Song – Motion Picture, Television or Other Visual Media	Annie Lennox, Howard Shore and Fran Walsh (for "Into the West")	Won
Hugo Awards	Best Dramatic Presentation: Long Form		Won
Irish Film and Television Awards	Best International Film	Peter Jackson	Won
Jupiter Award	Best International Film	Peter Jackson	Won
Jupiter Award	Best International Director	Peter Jackson	Won
London Film Critics	Film of the Year		Nominated
London Film Critics	Director of the Year	Peter Jackson	Nominated
Los Angeles Film Critics	Films of the Decade	The Lord of the Rings Trilogy	Won
Los Angeles Film Critics	Best Director	Peter Jackson	Won
Los Angeles Film Critics	Best Production Design	Grant Major	Won
Motion Picture Sound Editors	Best Sound Editing – Foreign Film	Mike Hopkins, Ethan Van der Ryan, David Farmer, Brent Burge, Dave Whitehead, Hayden Collow, Craig Tomlinson, Beau Borders, Timothy Nielsen, Addison Teague, Katy Wood, Peter Mills, Jason Canovas, Mark Franken, Ray Beentjes, Nick Breslin, Polly McKinnon, and Chris Ward	Nominated
Motion Picture Sound Editors	Best Sound Editing – Music – Feature Film, Domestic and Foreign	Jonathan Schultz, Andrew Dudman, Steve Price, Michael Price, Malcolm Fife, Nigel Scott, and Rebecca Gatrell	Nominated
MTV Movie Awards	Best Movie		Won
MTV Movie Awards	Best Action Sequence	"Battle Of Gondor"	Won
National Board of Review	Best Cast	Elijah Wood, Sean Astin, Liv Tyler, Billy Boyd, Andy Serkis, and Bernard Hill	Won
National Society of Film Critics	Best Director	Peter Jackson	Nominated
Nebula Awards	Best Script	Frances Walsh, Phillipa Boyens, and Peter Jackson	Won
New York Film Critics	Best Picture		Won
Online Film Critics	Best Picture		Won
Online Film Critics	Best Director	Peter Jackson	Won
Online Film Critics	Best Adapted Screenplay	Philippa Boyens, Peter Jackson, and Frances Walsh	Won
Online Film Critics	Best Supporting Actor	Sean Astin	Nominated
Online Film Critics	Best Supporting Actor	Andy Serkis	Nominated
Online Film Critics	Best Art Direction		Won
Online Film Critics	Best Cinematography	Andrew Lesnie	Won
Online Film Critics	Best Costume Design		Won
Online Film Critics	Best Original Score	Howard Shore	Won
Online Film Critics	Best Sound		Won
Online Film Critics	Best Visual Effects		Won
Producers Guild of America	Motion Picture Producer of the Year Award	Peter Jackson, Barrie Osborne, and Fran Walsh	Won
San Diego Film Critics	Best Director	Peter Jackson	Won
San Diego Film Critics	Best Production Design	Grant Major	Won
San Francisco Film Critics	Best Director	Peter Jackson	Won
Santa Barbara International Film Festival	Modern Master Award	Peter Jackson	Won
Satellite Awards	Best Picture - Drama		Nominated
Satellite Awards	Best Art Direction & Production Design	Grant Major, Dan Hennah, and Alan Lee	Won
Satellite Awards	Best Cinematography	Andrew Lesnie	Nominated
Satellite Awards	Best Costume Design	Ngila Dickson and Richard Taylor	Nominated
Satellite Awards	Best Film Editing	Jamie Selkirk	Nominated
Satellite Awards	Best Original Score	Howard Shore	Nominated
Satellite Awards	Best Sound (Mixing & Editing)	David Farmer, Ethan Van der Ryn, and Michael Hopkins	Nominated
Satellite Awards	Best Visual Effects	Jim Rygiel, Joe Letteri, Randall William Cook, and Alex Funke	Nominated
Saturn Awards	Best Fantasy Film		Won
Saturn Awards	Best Director	Peter Jackson	Won
Saturn Awards	Best Screenplay	Fran Walsh, Phillipa Boyens, and Peter Jackson	Won
Saturn Awards	Best Actor	Elijah Wood	Won
Saturn Awards	Best Actor	Viggo Mortensen	Nominated
Saturn Awards	Best Supporting Actor	Sean Astin	Won
Saturn Awards	Best Supporting Actor	Ian McKellen	Nominated
Saturn Awards	Best Supporting Actor	Andy Serkis	Nominated
Saturn Awards	Best Supporting Actress	Miranda Otto	Nominated
Saturn Awards	Best Costume Design	Ngila Dickson and Richard Taylor	Nominated
Saturn Awards	Best Make-up	Richard Taylor and Peter King	Won
Saturn Awards	Best Score	Howard Shore	Won
Saturn Awards	Best Visual Effects	Jim Rygiel, Joe Letteri, Randall William Cook, and Alex Funke	Won
Screen Actors Guild	Outstanding Cast – Motion Picture	Sean Astin, Sean Bean, Cate Blanchett, Orlando Bloom, Billy Boyd, Marton Csokas, Brad Dourif, Bernard Hill, Ian Holm, Christopher Lee, Ian McKellen, Dominic Monaghan, Viggo Mortensen, John Noble, Miranda Otto, Craig Parker, John Rhys-Davies, Andy Serkis, Liv Tyler, Karl Urban, Hugo Weaving, David Wenham, and Elijah Wood	Won
SFX Awards	Best Film		Won
SFX Awards	Best Director	Peter Jackson	Won
Spacey Awards	Best Fantasy or Sci-fi Film		Won
Spacey Awards	Best Visual Effects		Won
Spacey Awards	Special Achievement	Peter Jackson	Won
Toronto Film Critics	Best Director	Peter Jackson	Won
Toronto Film Critics	Special Citation	Peter Jackson for the whole "Lord of the Rings" Trilogy	Won
USC Scripter Awards	USC Scripter Award	Frances Walsh & Philippa Boyens, and Peter Jackson	Nominated
Vancouver Film Critics Circle	Best Picture		Runner-up
Vancouver Film Critics Circle	Best Director	Peter Jackson	Won
Visual Effects Society	Outstanding Visual Effects – Visual Effects Driven Motion Picture	Randall Cook, Joe Letteri, Jim Rygiel, and Dean Wright	Won
Visual Effects Society	Best Single Visual Effect of the Year in Any Medium	Randall Cook, Joe Letteri, Jim Rygiel, and Dean Wright	Nominated
Visual Effects Society	Outstanding Character Animation – Live Action Motion Picture	Greg Butler, Steven Hornby, Matthias Menz, and Andy Serkis	Won
Visual Effects Society	Outstanding Compositing – Motion Picture	Moritz Glaesle, Mark Lewis, and Kara Vandeleur	Nominated
Visual Effects Society	Outstanding Models and Miniatures – Motion Picture	Eric Saindon, Richard Taylor, and Paul Van Ommen	Won
Visual Effects Society	Outstanding Male or Female Actor – Effects Film	Sean Astin	Won
Visual Effects Society	Outstanding Special Effects in Service to Visual Effects – Motion Picture	Scott Harens, Sven Harens, and Chuck Shuman	Nominated
Visual Effects Society	Outstanding Visual Effects Photography – Motion Picture	Alex Funke, Rob Kerr, and Henk Prins	Nominated
Washington D.C. Area Film Critics	Best Picture		Won
Washington D.C. Area Film Critics	Best Director	Peter Jackson	Won
Washington D.C. Area Film Critics	Best Screenplay – Adapted	Philippa Boyens, Peter Jackson, and Frances Walsh	Nominated
Washington D.C. Area Film Critics	Best Ensemble		Nominated
World Soundtrack Awards	Best Original Song Written for a Film	Howard Shore (Composer) Annie Lennox (Performer) Fran Walsh (Lyrics)	Nominated
Writers Guild of America	Best Screenplay – Adapted	Philippa Boyens, Peter Jackson, and Fran Walsh	Nominated
Young Artist Awards	Best Family Feature Film – Drama		Won

== See also ==
- List of accolades received by The Hobbit film series
- 2001 in film
- 2002 in film
- 2003 in film
- List of films considered the best
- List of highest-grossing films
