= Online Film Critics Society discontinued awards =

Discontinued awards by the Online Film Critics Society

== Best Screenplay (1997, 2000) ==
=== 1997 ===
Boogie Nights – Paul Thomas Anderson

- Good Will Hunting – Ben Affleck, Matt Damon
- L.A. Confidential – Curtis Hanson, Brian Helgeland

=== 2000 ===
Almost Famous – Cameron Crowe

- Quills – Doug Wright
- State and Main – David Mamet
- Traffic – Stephen Gaghan
- Wonder Boys – Steve Kloves
- You Can Count on Me – Kenneth Lonergan

== Best Cast / Ensemble (1998-2002) ==
=== 1998 ===
Saving Private Ryan

- Happiness
- Your Friends & Neighbors

=== 1999 ===
American Beauty

- Being John Malkovich
- The Cradle Will Rock
- The Green Mile
- Magnolia

=== 2000 ===
Almost Famous / State and Main

- Requiem for a Dream
- Traffic
- Wonder Boys

=== 2001 ===
Gosford Park

- Ghost World
- The Lord of the Rings: The Fellowship of the Ring
- Ocean's Eleven
- The Royal Tenenbaums

=== 2002 ===
The Lord of the Rings: The Two Towers

- 8 Women
- Adaptation.
- Chicago
- Gangs of New York

== Best Film Review Website (1999) ==
- Roger Ebert (suntimes.com/ebert/index.html)

== Best DVD (2000-2001) ==
- 2000: Fight Club
- 2001: Moulin Rouge

== Best DVD Special Features (2000) ==
- 2000: Fight Club

== Best DVD Commentary (2000) ==
- 2000: Fight Club

== Best Film Related Website (2000) ==
- 2000: Internet Movie Database

== Best Art Direction (2002-2003) ==
- 2002: Far From Heaven

designed by Mark Friedberg (production design) Ellen Christiansen (set decoration)

- 2003: The Lord of the Rings: The Return of the King

designed by Grant Major (production design) Dan Hennah and Alan Lee (set decoration)

== Best Costume Design (2002-2003) ==
- 2002: Far From Heaven

designed by Sandy Powell

- 2003: The Lord of the Rings: The Return of the King

designed by Ngila Dickson and Richard Taylor

== Best Sound (2002-2003) ==
- 2002: The Lord of the Rings: The Two Towers

designed by Christopher Boyes, Michael Semanick, Michael Hedges and Hammond Peek

- 2003: The Lord of the Rings: The Return of the King

designed by Christopher Boyes, Michael Semanick, Michael Hedges and Hammond Peek

- 2013: Gravity (given as special award)

== Best Visual Effects (2002-2003) ==
- 2002: The Lord of the Rings: The Two Towers

designed by Jim Rygiel, Joe Letteri, Randall William Cook and Alex Funke

- 2003: The Lord of the Rings: The Return of the King

designed by Jim Rygiel, Joe Letteri, Randall William Cook and Alex Funke

- 2013: Gravity (given as special award)
