= 30th Saturn Awards =

US film and television award ceremony

- Date: May 5, 2004
- Site: Sheraton Universal Hotel; Los Angeles, California, U.S.

Highlights
- Most awards: The Lord of the Rings: The Return of the King (8)
- Most nominations: The Lord of the Rings: The Return of the King (13)

The 30th Saturn Awards, presented by the Academy of Science Fiction, Fantasy and Horror Films and honoring the best in science fiction, fantasy, horror, and other genres belonging to genre fiction in film, television and home entertainment in 2003, were held on May 5, 2004, at the Sheraton Universal Hotel in Los Angeles, California. The nominees were announced on February 17, 2004.

The five Best Film categories were respectively won by X2: X-Men United (Science Fiction), The Lord of the Rings: The Return of the King (Fantasy), 28 Days Later (Horror), Kill Bill: Volume 1 (Action/Adventure/Thriller Film), and Finding Nemo (Animated). The Lord of the Rings: The Return of the King received the most wins with eight, a record until Avatar (2009) won ten at the 36th Saturn Awards in 2010, and most nominations with thirteen (including two Best Actor nominations and three Best Supporting Actor nominations).

The ceremony marked the only time an individual received one single nomination for two different works: James Marsters won Best Supporting Actor on Television for his work on the television series Buffy the Vampire Slayer and its spin-off series Angel; he portrayed the same character, Spike, in both. Ellen DeGeneres also became the first actress to win a Saturn Award for voice acting for Finding Nemo, and the third performer to do so after Scott Weinger and Robin Williams at the 19th Saturn Awards in 1993, both for Aladdin (1992).

Below is a complete list of nominees and winners. Winners are highlighted in boldface.

== Winners and nominees ==
=== Film ===
Best Science Fiction Film	Best Fantasy Film
**X2: X-Men United**; Hulk; Lara Croft: Tomb Raider – The Cradle of Life; The Matrix Revolutions; Paycheck; Terminator 3: Rise of the Machines	**The Lord of the Rings: The Return of the King**; Big Fish; Freaky Friday; The League of Extraordinary Gentlemen; Peter Pan; Pirates of the Caribbean: The Curse of the Black Pearl
Best Horror Film	Best Action/Adventure/Thriller Film
**28 Days Later**; Cabin Fever; Final Destination 2; Freddy vs. Jason; Jeepers Creepers 2; The Texas Chainsaw Massacre; Underworld	**Kill Bill: Volume 1**; Cold Mountain; Identity; The Italian Job; The Last Samurai; The Missing
Best Director	Best Writing
**Peter Jackson – The Lord of the Rings: The Return of the King**; Danny Boyle – 28 Days Later; Bryan Singer – X2: X-Men United; Quentin Tarantino – Kill Bill: Volume 1; Gore Verbinski – Pirates of the Caribbean: The Curse of the Black Pearl; Edward Zwick – The Last Samurai	**Fran Walsh, Philippa Boyens, and Peter Jackson – The Lord of the Rings: The Return of the King**; Michael Dougherty, Dan Harris, and David Hayter – X2: X-Men United; Alex Garland – 28 Days Later; Heather Hach and Leslie Dixon – Freaky Friday; Andrew Stanton, Bob Peterson, and David Reynolds – Finding Nemo; Quentin Tarantino – Kill Bill: Volume 1
Best Actor	Best Actress
**Elijah Wood – The Lord of the Rings: The Return of the King as Frodo Baggins**; Tom Cruise – The Last Samurai as Captain Nathan Algren; Johnny Depp – Pirates of the Caribbean: The Curse of the Black Pearl as Captain Jack Sparrow; Albert Finney – Big Fish as Ed Bloom (senior); Crispin Glover – Willard as Willard Stiles; Viggo Mortensen – The Lord of the Rings: The Return of the King as Aragorn	**Uma Thurman – Kill Bill: Volume 1 as The Bride**; Kate Beckinsale – Underworld as Selene; Jessica Biel – The Texas Chainsaw Massacre as Erin; Cate Blanchett – The Missing as Magdalena "Maggie" Gilkeson; Jennifer Connelly – Hulk as Betty Ross; Jamie Lee Curtis – Freaky Friday as Tess Coleman / Anna Coleman
Best Supporting Actor	Best Supporting Actress
**Sean Astin – The Lord of the Rings: The Return of the King as Samwise Gamgee**; Sonny Chiba – Kill Bill: Volume 1 as Hattori Hanzō; Ian McKellen – The Lord of the Rings: The Return of the King as Gandalf the White; Geoffrey Rush – Pirates of the Caribbean: The Curse of the Black Pearl as Captain Hector Barbossa; Andy Serkis – The Lord of the Rings: The Return of the King as Gollum / Sméagol; Ken Watanabe – The Last Samurai as Lord Katsumoto Moritsugu	**Ellen DeGeneres – Finding Nemo as Dory**; Keira Knightley – Pirates of the Caribbean: The Curse of the Black Pearl as Elizabeth Swann; Kristanna Loken – Terminator 3: Rise of the Machines as T-X; Lucy Liu – Kill Bill: Volume 1 as O-Ren Ishii; Miranda Otto – The Lord of the Rings: The Return of the King as Éowyn; Peta Wilson – The League of Extraordinary Gentlemen as Mina Harker
Best Performance by a Younger Actor	Best Music
**Jeremy Sumpter – Peter Pan as Peter Pan**; Jenna Boyd – The Missing as Dot Gilkeson; Rachel Hurd-Wood – Peter Pan as Wendy Darling; Sosuke Ikematsu – The Last Samurai as Higen; Lindsay Lohan – Freaky Friday as Anna Coleman / Tess Coleman; Frankie Muniz – Agent Cody Banks as Agent Cody Banks	**Howard Shore – The Lord of the Rings: The Return of the King**; Klaus Badelt – Pirates of the Caribbean: The Curse of the Black Pearl; Danny Elfman – Hulk; Jerry Goldsmith – Looney Tunes: Back in Action; Thomas Newman – Finding Nemo; John Ottman – X2: X-Men United
Best Costumes	Best Make-up
**Penny Rose – Pirates of the Caribbean: The Curse of the Black Pearl**; Kym Barrett – The Matrix Revolutions; Ngila Dickson and Richard Taylor – The Lord of the Rings: The Return of the King; Louise Mingenbach – X2: X-Men United; Janet Patterson – Peter Pan; Jacqueline West – The League of Extraordinary Gentlemen	**Richard Taylor and Peter King – The Lord of the Rings: The Return of the King**; Rick Baker, Bill Corso, and Robin L. Neal – The Haunted Mansion; Jeff Dawn and John Rosengrant – Terminator 3: Rise of the Machines; Ve Neill and Martin Samuel – Pirates of the Caribbean: The Curse of the Black Pearl; Trefor Proud and Balázs Novák – Underworld; Gordon J. Smith – X2: X-Men United
Best Special Effects	Best Animated Film
**Jim Rygiel, Joe Letteri, Randall William Cook, and Alex Funke – The Lord of the Rings: The Return of the King**; Michael L. Fink, Richard E. Hollander, Stephen Rosenbaum, and Mike Vézina – X2: X-Men United; John Gaeta, Kim Libreri, George Murphy, and Craig Hayes – The Matrix Revolutions; Pablo Helman, Danny Gordon Taylor, Allen Hall, and John Rosengrant – Terminator 3: Rise of the Machines; John Knoll, Hal Hickel, Terry Frazee, and Charles Gibson – Pirates of the Caribbean: The Curse of the Black Pearl; Dennis Muren, Ed Hirsh, Colin Brady, and Michael Lantieri – Hulk	**Finding Nemo**; Brother Bear; Looney Tunes: Back in Action; Sinbad: Legend of the Seven Seas

=== Television ===
==== Programs ====
Best Network Television Series	Best Syndicated/Cable Television Series
**Angel (The WB) (TIE)**; **CSI: Crime Scene Investigation (CBS) (TIE)**; Alias (ABC); Buffy the Vampire Slayer (UPN); Smallville (The WB); Star Trek: Enterprise (UPN)	**Stargate SG-1 (Sci Fi)**; Andromeda (Syndicated); Carnivàle (HBO); Dead Like Me (Showtime); The Dead Zone (USA); Farscape (Sci Fi)
Best Television Presentation
**Battlestar Galactica (Sci Fi)**; The Diary of Ellen Rimbauer (ABC); Dreamkeeper (ABC); Frank Herbert's Children of Dune (Sci Fi); Riverworld (Sci Fi); Star Wars: Clone Wars (Cartoon Network)

==== Acting ====
Best Actor on Television	Best Actress on Television
**David Boreanaz – Angel (The WB) as Angel**; Richard Dean Anderson – Stargate SG-1 (Sci Fi) as Jack O'Neill; Scott Bakula – Star Trek: Enterprise (UPN) as Jonathan Archer; Michael Shanks – Stargate SG-1 (Sci Fi) as Daniel Jackson; Michael Vartan – Alias (ABC) as Michael Vaughn; Tom Welling – Smallville (The WB) as Clark Kent	**Amber Tamblyn – Joan of Arcadia (CBS) as Joan Girardi**; Eliza Dushku – Tru Calling (Fox) as Tru Davies; Jennifer Garner – Alias (ABC) as Sydney Bristow; Sarah Michelle Gellar – Buffy the Vampire Slayer (UPN) as Buffy Summers; Kristin Kreuk – Smallville (The WB) as Lana Lang; Ellen Muth – Dead Like Me (Showtime) as Georgia Lass
Best Supporting Actor on Television	Best Supporting Actress on Television
**James Marsters – Angel (The WB) / Buffy the Vampire Slayer (UPN) as Spike**; Alexis Denisof – Angel (The WB) as Wesley Wyndam-Pryce; Victor Garber – Alias (ABC) as Jack Bristow; John Glover – Smallville (The WB) as Lionel Luthor; Michael Rosenbaum – Smallville (The WB) as Lex Luthor; Nick Stahl – Carnivàle (HBO) as Ben Hawkins	**Amy Acker – Angel (The WB) as Winifred Burkle**; Jolene Blalock – Star Trek: Enterprise (UPN) as T'Pol; Charisma Carpenter – Angel (The WB) as Cordelia Chase; Victoria Pratt – Mutant X (Syndicated) as Shalimar Fox; Katee Sackhoff – Battlestar Galactica (Sci Fi) as Kara Thrace; Amanda Tapping – Stargate SG-1 (Sci Fi) as Samantha Carter

=== Home Entertainment ===
Best DVD Release	Best DVD Special Edition Release
**Bionicle: Mask of Light**; Anatomy 2; The Hitcher II: I've Been Waiting; Interstate 60; May; Sennen joyû	**The Lord of the Rings: The Two Towers: Special Extended DVD Edition**; Black Hawk Down: 3-Disc Deluxe Edition; Finding Nemo: 2-Disc Collector's Edition; Harry Potter and the Chamber of Secrets; Identity: Special Edition; Pirates of the Caribbean: The Curse of the Black Pearl: 2-Disc Collector's Edition
Best DVD Classic Film Release	Best DVD Movie Collection
**The Adventures of Robin Hood**; 20,000 Leagues Under the Sea; C'era una volta il West; Dead of Night; The Lion King; Roadgames	**The Adventures of Indiana Jones: The Complete DVD Movie Collection**; Alien Quadrilogy; The Jack Ryan Special Edition DVD Collection; Lon Chaney Collection (TCM Archives); The Mystery Science Theater 3000 Collection: Vol. 2–4; X-Men Collection (4-Disc Set includes X-Men and X2: X-Men United)
Best DVD Television Release
**Firefly: The Complete Firefly**; Battlestar Galactica: The Complete Epic Series; Hercules: The Legendary Journeys: Seasons 1 & 2; Star Trek: Deep Space Nine: Seasons 1–7; Taken; Wiseguy: Season 1 – Parts 1 & 2

=== Special Achievement Awards ===
- **Visionary Award: Paul Allen**
- **Life Career Award: Blake Edwards**
- **Filmmaker's Showcase Award: Eli Roth**
- **George Pal Memorial Award: Ridley Scott**
- **Dr. Donald A. Reed Award: Gale Anne Hurd**
- **Lifetime Achievement Award: John Williams**

=== Cinescape Genre Face of the Future Awards ===
Male	Female
**Scott Speedman – Underworld**; James Badge Dale – 24; Christopher Gorham – Jake 2.0; Jason Ritter – Freddy vs. Jason; Clayton Watson – The Matrix Reloaded and The Matrix Revolutions; Shane West – The League of Extraordinary Gentlemen	**Melissa George – Alias**; Reiko Aylesworth – 24; Keira Knightley – Pirates of the Caribbean: The Curse of the Black Pearl; Chiaki Kuriyama – Kill Bill: Volume 1; Gabrielle Union – Bad Boys II and Cradle 2 the Grave; Cerina Vincent – Cabin Fever
