= List of accolades received by The Hobbit film series =

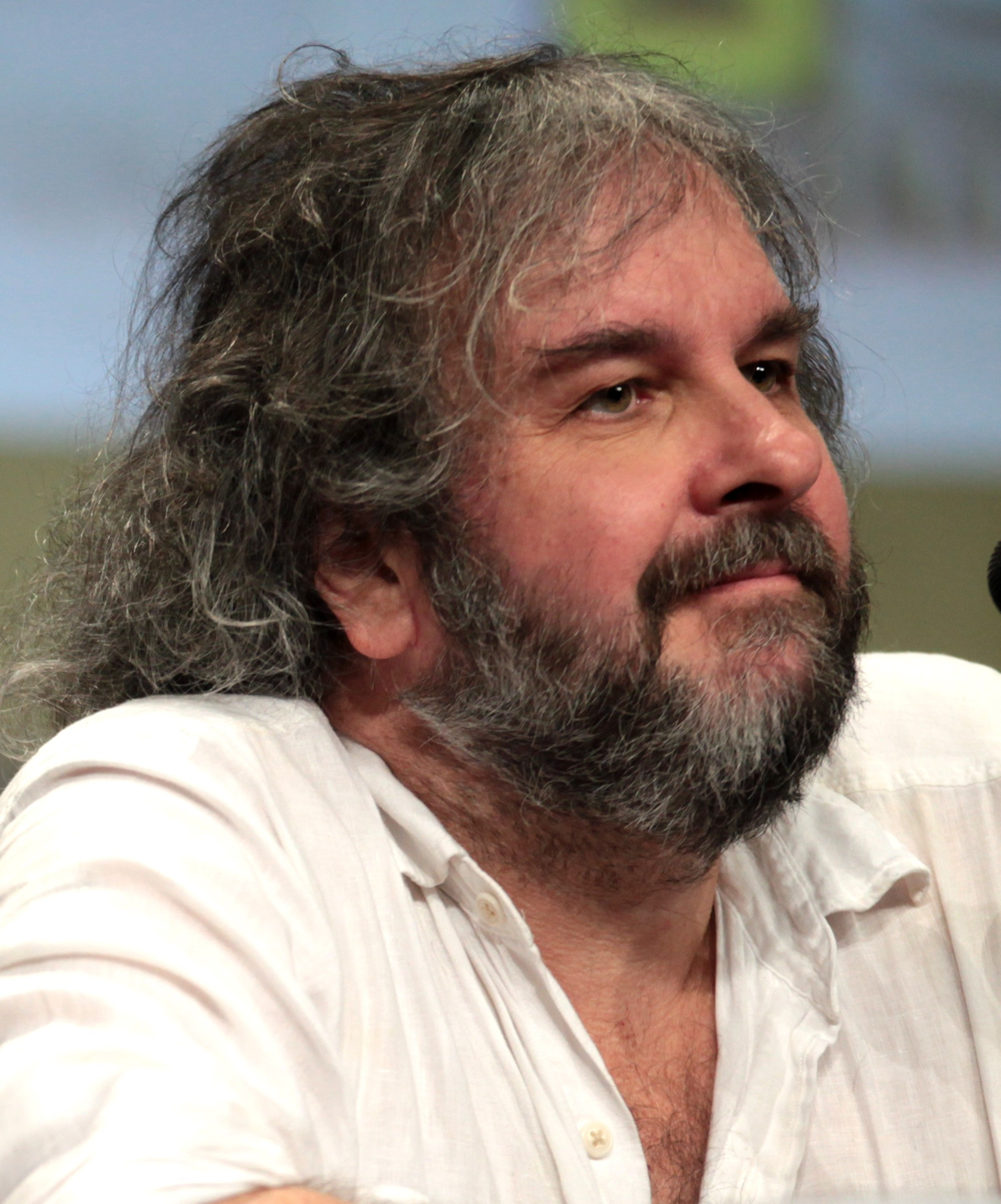
- Peter Jackson, director of The Hobbit film series.

Total number of wins and nominations
- Won: 43
- Nominated: 180

The Hobbit film series is a series of epic fantasy-drama films directed by Peter Jackson. The three films, entitled An Unexpected Journey, The Desolation of Smaug, and The Battle of the Five Armies, are released worldwide in 2012, 2013 and 2014, respectively. They are based on J. R. R. Tolkien's fantasy novel, The Hobbit, adapted for the screen by Jackson, Fran Walsh, Philippa Boyens and Guillermo del Toro. A large ensemble cast was featured in the series, which included Ian McKellen, Martin Freeman, Richard Armitage, Aidan Turner, Dean O'Gorman, Benedict Cumberbatch, Evangeline Lilly, Orlando Bloom, Lee Pace, Christopher Lee, Stephen Fry, Ryan Gage and Cate Blanchett.

== An Unexpected Journey ==
The Hobbit: An Unexpected Journey was released in New Zealand on 12 December 2012. It was released in the United Kingdom on December 13 and in North America and Europe on December 14.

An Unexpected Journey has won the "Technical Achievement" award by the Houston Film Critics Society, who also nominated it for "Best Original Song", the award for "Outstanding Virtual Cinematography" by the Visual Effects Society, the Best Hero award for Martin Freeman at the 2013 MTV Movie Awards and the Empire Awards for "Best Actor" and "Best Sci-Fi/Fantasy". Among others, the film has also received three Academy Award nominations, a nomination from the Washington D.C. Area Film Critics Association, four nominations from the Broadcast Film Critics Association, six nominations from the Visual Effects Society, and three nominations from the Phoenix Film Critics Society.

Organization	Award category	Recipients	Result
ASCAP Awards	Top Box Office Films	Howard Shore	Won
Academy Awards	Best Makeup and Hairstyling	Peter Swords King, Rick Findlater and Tami Lane	Nominated
Academy Awards	Best Production Design	Dan Hennah, Ra Vincent and Simon Bright	Nominated
Academy Awards	Best Visual Effects	Joe Letteri, Eric Saindon, David Clayton and R. Christopher White	Nominated
Academy Awards	Scientific and Engineering Award	Simon Clutterbuck, James Jacobs and Dr. Richard Dorling	Won
AEAF Awards 2013	Feature Film - Visual Effects	Weta Digital	Won
Annie Awards	Outstanding Achievement in Character Animation in a Live Action Production	Jeff Capogreco, Jedrzej Wojtowicz, Kevin Estey, Alessandro Bonora, Gino Acevedo (for Gollum)	Won
Annie Awards	Outstanding Achievement in Character Animation in a Live Action Production	David Clayton, Simeon Duncombe, Jung Min Chang, Matthew Cioffi, Guillaume François (for Goblin King)	Nominated
Art Directors Guild	ADG Excellence in Production Design for a Feature Fantasy Film	Dan Hennah	Nominated
Australia Box Office Awards	Real D Award for Highest Grossing 3D Film in Australia		Won
Australia Box Office Awards	Real D Award for Highest Grossing Film in New Zealand		Won
British Academy Children's Awards	Feature Film		Nominated
British Academy Film Awards	Best Achievement in Special Visual Effects		Nominated
British Academy Film Awards	Best Make Up/Hair		Nominated
British Academy Film Awards	Best Sound		Nominated
British Fantasy Awards	Best Screenplay	Peter Jackson, Philippa Boyens, Fran Walsh, Guillermo del Toro	Nominated
Broadcast Film Critics Association	Art Direction	Dan Hennah, Ra Vincent, Simon Bright	Nominated
Broadcast Film Critics Association	Costume Design	Bob Buck, Ann Maskrey, Richard Taylor	Nominated
Broadcast Film Critics Association	Makeup		Nominated
Broadcast Film Critics Association	Visual Effects		Nominated
Central Ohio Film Critics Association	Best Score	Howard Shore	Nominated
Cinema Audio Society	Outstanding Achievement in Sound Mixing	Tony Johnson, Christopher Boyes, Michael Hedges, Michael Semanick	Nominated
Colonne Sonore Awards	Best Music for a Foreign Language Film	Howard Shore	Won
Constellation Awards	Best Science Fiction Film, TV Movie, Or Mini-Series Of 2012		Nominated
Constellation Awards	Best Male Performance In A 2012 Science Fiction Film, TV Movie, Or Mini-Series	Martin Freeman	Nominated
Costume Designers Guild	Excellence in Fantasy Film	Richard Taylor, Bob Buck, Ann Maskrey	Nominated
Empire Awards	Best Sci-Fi/Fantasy		Won
Empire Awards	Best Art of 3D		Nominated
Empire Awards	Best Director	Peter Jackson	Nominated
Empire Awards	Best Actor	Martin Freeman	Won
Empire Awards	Best Film		Nominated
Georgia Film Critics Association	Best Production Design	Dan Hennah	Nominated
Golden Trailer Awards	Best Animation/Family		Nominated
Golden Trailer Awards	Most Innovative Advertising For A Feature Film		Nominated
Houston Film Critics Society	Best Original Song	Howard Shore	Nominated
Houston Film Critics Society	Technical Achievement		Won
Hollywood Post Alliance Awards	Outstanding Visual Effects- Feature Film	Joe Letteri, Eric Saindon, David Clayton, R.Christopher White	Nominated
Hugo Awards	Best Dramatic Presentation-Long Form	Peter Jackson, Philippa Boyens, Fran Walsh, Guillermo del Toro	Nominated
IGN Best of 2012	Best Fantasy Movie		Nominated
IGN Best of 2012	Best Movie Poster		Nominated
IGN People's Choice Awards	Best Fantasy Movie		Won
IGN Best of 2013	Best Movie Blu-ray		Nominated
International Film Music Critics Association Awards	Film Score of the Year	Howard Shore	Nominated
International Film Music Critics Association Awards	Best Original Score for a Fantasy/Science Fiction/Horror Film	Howard Shore	Nominated
IMP Awards	Best Teaser Movie Poster		Nominated
IMP Awards	Best Character Poster Set		Nominated
IMP Awards	Best Special Edition Movie Poster		Nominated
Motion Picture Sound Editors Guild	Best Sound Editing: Music in a Feature Film		Nominated
Motion Picture Sound Editors Guild	Best Sound Editing: Dialogue and ADR in a Feature Film		Nominated
Motion Picture Sound Editors Guild	Best Sound Editing: Sound Effects and Foley in a Feature Film		Nominated
MovieGuide Awards	Best Film For Mature Audiences		Nominated
MTV Movie Awards	Best Hero	Martin Freeman	Won
MTV Movie Awards	Best Scared-as-S**t Performance	Martin Freeman	Nominated
New Zealand Movie Awards	Movie Of The Year		Won
New Zealand Movie Awards	Best Sci-Fi/Fantasy		Nominated
New Zealand Movie Awards	Best Director	Peter Jackson	Won
New Zealand Movie Awards	Hero Of The Year	Martin Freeman	Nominated
NME Awards	Best Film		Won
Phoenix Film Critics Society	Production Design	Dan Hennah	Nominated
Phoenix Film Critics Society	Costume Design	Bob Buck, Ann Maskrey, Richard Taylor	Nominated
Phoenix Film Critics Society	Visual Effects		Nominated
Rembrandt Awards	Best International Film		Nominated
Saturn Awards	Best Fantasy Film		Nominated
Saturn Awards	Best Director	Peter Jackson	Nominated
Saturn Awards	Best Actor	Martin Freeman	Nominated
Saturn Awards	Best Supporting Actor	Ian McKellen	Nominated
Saturn Awards	Best Music	Howard Shore	Nominated
Saturn Awards	Best Production Design	Dan Hennah	Won
Saturn Awards	Best Costume	Bob Buck, Ann Maskrey and Richard Taylor	Nominated
Saturn Awards	Best Make-up	Peter Swords King, Rick Findlater and Tami Lane	Nominated
Saturn Awards	Best Special Effects	Joe Letteri, Eric Saindon, David Clayton and R. Christopher White	Nominated
SFX Awards	SFX Award For Best Film		Nominated
SFX Awards	SFX Award For Best Director	Peter Jackson	Nominated
SFX Awards	SFX Award For Best Actor	Martin Freeman	Nominated
SFX Awards	SFX Award For Best Actor	Ian McKellen	Nominated
SFX Awards	SFX Award For Best Actor	Richard Armitage	Nominated
SFX Awards	SFX Award For Sexiest Male	Aidan Turner	Nominated
Total Film Hotlist Awards	Hottest Trailer		Won
Total Film Hotlist Awards	Hottest Director	Peter Jackson	Nominated
Total Film Hotlist Awards	Hottest Actor	Martin Freeman	Nominated
Total Film Hotlist Awards	Hottest Actor	Benedict Cumberbatch	Nominated
Tumblr Movie Awards	Best Picture		Won
Tumblr Movie Awards	Best Directing	Peter Jackson	Nominated
Tumblr Movie Awards	Best Action Movie		Nominated
Tumblr Movie Awards	Best Leading Actor	Martin Freeman	Nominated
Tumblr Movie Awards	Best Adapted Screenplay		Won
Tumblr Movie Awards	Best Song in a Movie	Song of The Lonely Mountain	Nominated
Tumblr Movie Awards	Best Original Score		Nominated
Tumblr Movie Awards	Best Cinematography		Nominated
Tumblr Movie Awards	Best Art Direction		Won
Tumblr Movie Awards	Best Visual Effects		Nominated
Tumblr Movie Awards	Best Movie Scene	Bilbo and Gollum's Riddles	Nominated
Tumblr Movie Awards	Best Ship	Martin Freeman, Richard Armitage	Nominated
Visual Effects Society	Outstanding Visual Effects in a Visual Effects-Driven Feature Motion Picture	Joe Letteri, Eileen Moran, Eric Saindon, Kevin L. Sherwood	Nominated
Visual Effects Society	Outstanding Animated Character in a Live Action Feature Motion Picture	Goblin King: Barry Humphries, Jung Min Chan, James Jacobs, David Clayton, Guillaume Francois	Nominated
Visual Effects Society	Outstanding Animated Character in a Live Action Feature Motion Picture	Gollum: Andy Serkis, Gino Acevedo, Alessandro Bonora, Jeff Capogreco, Kevin Estey	Nominated
Visual Effects Society	Outstanding Created Environment in a Live Action Feature Motion Picture	Goblin Caverns: Ryan Arcus, Simon Jung, Alastair Maher, Anthony M. Patti	Nominated
Visual Effects Society	Outstanding Virtual Cinematography in a Live Action Feature Motion Picture	Matt Aitken, Victor Huang, Christian Rivers, R. Christopher White	Won
Visual Effects Society	Outstanding FX and Simulation Animation in a Live Action Feature Motion Picture	Areito Echevarria, Chet Leavai, Garry Runke, Francois Sugny	Nominated
Visual Effects Society	Outstanding Compositing in a Feature Motion Picture	Jean-Luc Azzis, Steven Mcgillen, Christoph Salzmann, Charles Tait	Nominated
Washington D.C. Area Film Critics Association	Best Score	Howard Shore	Nominated
World Soundtrack Awards	Best Original Film Score Of The Year	Howard Shore	Nominated

== The Desolation of Smaug ==
The Hobbit: The Desolation of Smaug was released in December 12. In North America, it was released on December 13, 2013.

Organization	Award category	Recipients	Result
Academy Awards	Best Sound Editing	Brent Burge and Chris Ward	Nominated
Academy Awards	Best Sound Mixing	Christopher Boyes, Michael Hedges, Michael Semanick and Tony Johnson	Nominated
Academy Awards	Best Visual Effects	Joe Letteri, Eric Saindon, David Clayton and Eric Reynolds	Nominated
Art Directors Guild	ADG Excellence in Production Design for a Feature Fantasy Film	Dan Hennah	Nominated
Britannia Awards	British Artist of the Year	Benedict Cumberbatch (also for 12 Years a Slave, August: Osage County, The Fifth Estate, and Star Trek Into Darkness)	Won
British Academy Film Awards	Best Achievement in Special Visual Effects		Nominated
British Academy Film Awards	Best Make Up/Hair		Nominated
Broadcast Film Critics Association	Art Direction	Dan Hennah, Ra Vincent, Simon Bright	Nominated
Broadcast Film Critics Association	Costume Design	Bob Buck, Ann Maskrey, Richard Taylor	Nominated
Broadcast Film Critics Association	Makeup		Nominated
Broadcast Film Critics Association	Visual Effects		Nominated
Broadcast Film Critics Association	Broadcast Film Critics Association Award for Best Actress in an Action Movie	Evangeline Lilly	Nominated
Central Ohio Film Critics Association	Actor of the Year	Benedict Cumberbatch	Nominated
Central Ohio Film Critics Association	Best Director	Peter Jackson	Nominated
Central Ohio Film Critics Association	Best Hero	Martin Freeman	Nominated
Central Ohio Film Critics Association	Best Supporting Character	Ian McKellen	Won
Central Ohio Film Critics Association	Best Supporting Character	Orlando Bloom	Nominated
Central Ohio Film Critics Association	Best Villain	Benedict Cumberbatch	Nominated
Central Ohio Film Critics Association	Best Action Scene	Barrel Ride	Nominated
Central Ohio Film Critics Association	Best Action Scene	Smaug Chase	Nominated
Central Ohio Film Critics Association	Best Script		Nominated
Central Ohio Film Critics Association	Best Visual Effects		Nominated
Constellation Awards	Best Science Fiction Film, TV Movie, or Mini-Series of 2013		Nominated
Constellation Awards	Best Male Performance in a 2013 Science Fiction Film, TV Movie, or Mini-Series	Martin Freeman	Nominated
Costume Designers Guild	Excellence in Fantasy Film	Richard Taylor, Bob Buck, Ann Maskrey	Nominated
Denver Film Critics Society	Best Original Score	Howard Shore	Nominated
Empire Awards	Best Film		Nominated
Empire Awards	Best Sci-Fi/Fantasy		Won
Empire Awards	Best Director	Peter Jackson	Nominated
Empire Awards	Best Actor	Martin Freeman	Nominated
Empire Awards	Best Supporting Actress	Evangeline Lilly	Nominated
Empire Awards	Best Supporting Actor	Richard Armitage	Nominated
Empire Awards	Best Male Newcomer	Aidan Turner	Won
Florida Film Critics Circle Awards	Best Visual Effects		Nominated
Houston Film Critics Society Awards	Best Original Song	Ed Sheeran ("I See Fire")	Nominated
Grammy Award	Best Song Written for Visual Media	Ed Sheeran ("I See Fire")	Nominated
IGN's Best of 2013	Best Fantasy Movie		Won
IGN's Best of 2013	Best 3D Movie		Nominated
IGN's Best of 2013	Best Movie		Nominated
Kids' Choice Awards	Favorite Female Buttkicker	Evangeline Lilly	Nominated
IGN People's Choice Awards	Best Fantasy Movie		Won
IGN People's Choice Awards	Best Movie		Won
Motion Picture Sound Editors Golden Reel Awards	Best Sound Editing: Music Score in a Feature Film	Mark Willsher	Nominated
Motion Picture Sound Editors Golden Reel Awards	Best Sound Editing: Sound Effects & Foley in a Feature Film	Chris Ward	Nominated
New Zealand Movie Awards	Best Fantasy		Won
New Zealand Movie Awards	Biggest Bastard	Smaug	Nominated
MTV Movie Awards	Movie of the Year		Nominated
MTV Movie Awards	Best Fight	Orlando Bloom & Evangeline Lilly vs. Orcs	Won
MTV Movie Awards	Best On-Screen Transformation	Orlando Bloom	Nominated
MTV Movie Awards	Best Hero	Martin Freeman	Nominated
People's Choice Awards	Favorite Year End Movie		Nominated
Phoenix Film Critics Society	Best Original Score	Howard Shore	Nominated
Satellite Awards	Best Original Song	Ed Sheeran ("I See Fire")	Nominated
Saturn Awards	Best Fantasy Film		Nominated
Saturn Awards	Best Director	Peter Jackson	Nominated
Saturn Awards	Best Writing	Fran Walsh, Philippa Boyens, Peter Jackson and Guillermo del Toro	Nominated
Saturn Awards	Best Supporting Actress	Evangeline Lilly	Nominated
Saturn Awards	Best Music	Howard Shore	Nominated
Saturn Awards	Best Production Design	Dan Hennah	Won
Saturn Awards	Best Make-Up	Peter King, Rick Findlater and Richard Taylor	Nominated
Saturn Awards	Best Special Effects	Joe Letteri, Eric Saindon, David Clayton and Eric Reynolds	Nominated
St. Louis Gateway Film Critics Association	Best Visual Special Effects		Nominated
St. Louis Gateway Film Critics Association	Best Musical Score	Howard Shore	Nominated
Visual Effects Society	Outstanding Visual Effects in a Visual Effects-Driven Feature Motion Picture	Joe Letteri, Eric Saindon, Kevin Sherwood, David Clayton	Nominated
Visual Effects Society	Outstanding Animated Character in a Live Action Feature Motion Picture	Eric Reynolds, David Clayton, Myriam Catrin, Guillaume Francois for "Smaug"	Won
Visual Effects Society	Outstanding Virtual Cinematography in a Live Action Feature Motion Picture	Christian Rivers, Phil Barrenger, Mark Gee, Thelvin Tico Cabezas	Nominated
Visual Effects Society	Outstanding FX and Simulation Animation in a Live Action Feature Motion Picture	Areito Echevarria, Andreas Soderstrom, Ronnie Menahem, Christoph Sprenger	Nominated
Visual Effects Society	Outstanding Compositing in a Feature Motion Picture	Charles Tait, Robin Hollander, Giuseppe Tagliavini, Sean Heuston	Nominated
Annie Awards	Outstanding Achievement, Character Animation in a Live Action Production	Eric Reynolds, David Clayton, Andreja Vuckovic, Guillaume Francois, Gios Johnston	Nominated
Annie Awards	Outstanding Achievement, Animated Effects in a Live Action Production	Areito Echevarria, Andreas Soderstrom, Ronnie Menahem, Christoph Sprenger, Kevin Romond	Nominated
YouReviewers Awards	Best Visual Effects		Nominated
YouReviewers Awards	Best Hero	Martin Freeman	Nominated
YouReviewers Awards	Best Villain	Benedict Cumberbatch	Nominated

== The Battle of the Five Armies ==
The Hobbit: The Battle of the Five Armies was released on December 11, while in North America was released on December 17, 2014.

Organization	Award category	Recipients	Result
Academy Awards	Best Sound Editing	Brent Burge and Jason Canovas	Nominated
Screen Actors Guild Awards	Outstanding Performance by a Stunt Ensemble in a Motion Picture		Nominated
Denver Film Critics Society	Best Original Song	Billy Boyd, Philippa Boyens, Fran Walsh	Nominated
Broadcast Film Critics Associations	Best Hair & Makeup		Nominated
Broadcast Film Critics Associations	Best Visual Effects		Nominated
Heartland Film Festival	Truly Moving Picture Award		Won
Capri, Hollywood Award	Capri Breakout Actor Award	Ryan Gage	Won
Phoenix Film Critics Society Awards	Best Visual Effects	Joe Letteri, Matt Aitken, Eric Saindon, Scott Chambers	Nominated
Central Ohio Film Critics Association	Actor of the Year	Benedict Cumberbatch (also for The Imitation Game)	Nominated
Hollywood Makeup Artist and Hair Stylist Guild Awards	Best Special Makeup Effects in Feature Films	Gino Acevedo	Nominated
IGN Best of 2014	Best Fantasy Movie		Won
IGN People's Choice Awards	Best Fantasy Movie		Won
Visual Effects Society	Outstanding Visual Effects in a Visual Effects Driven Photoreal/Live Action Feature Motion Picture	Joe Letteri, David Conley, Eric Saindon, Kevin Sherwood, Steve Ingram	Nominated
Visual Effects Society	Outstanding Models in Any Motion Media Project	Leslie Chan, Alastair Mayer, Niklas Preston, Justin Stockton	Nominated
Visual Effects Society	Outstanding Effects Simulations in a Photoreal/Live Action Feature Motion Picture	Jon Allitt, David Caeiro, Ronnie Menahem	Nominated
Visual Effects Society	Outstanding Compositing in a Photoreal/Live Action Feature Motion Picture	Simon Jung, Ben Roberts, Matthew Adams, Jordan Schilling	Nominated
British Academy Film Awards	Best Special Visual Effects	Joe Letteri, Eric Saindon, David Clayton, R. Christopher White	Nominated
Costume Designers Guild Awards	Excellence in Fantasy Film	Bob Buck, Ann Maskrey, Richard Taylor	Nominated
International Film Music Critics Association	Best Original Score for a Fantasy/Science Fiction/Horror Film	Howard Shore	Nominated
Kids' Choice Awards	Favorite Female Action Star	Evangeline Lilly	Nominated
SFX Awards	SFX Award For Best Film		Nominated
SFX Awards	SFX Award For Best Director	Peter Jackson	Nominated
SFX Awards	SFX Award For Best Actor	Richard Armitage	Nominated
MTV Movie Awards	Best Hero	Martin Freeman	Nominated
Empire Awards	Best Sci-Fi/Fantasy		Nominated
Empire Awards	Best Actor	Richard Armitage	Nominated
Empire Awards	Best Director	Peter Jackson	Nominated
Empire Awards	Best Film		Nominated
MTV Movie Awards	Best Hero	Martin Freeman	Nominated
Saturn Awards	Best Fantasy Film		Won
Saturn Awards	Best Writing	Fran Walsh, Philippa Boyens, Peter Jackson and Guillermo del Toro	Nominated
Saturn Awards	Best Supporting Actor	Richard Armitage	Won
Saturn Awards	Best Supporting Actress	Evangeline Lilly	Nominated
Saturn Awards	Best Music	Howard Shore	Nominated
Saturn Awards	Best Make-up	Peter King, Rick Findlater and Gino Acevedo	Nominated
Saturn Awards	Best Special Effects	Joe Letteri, Eric Saindon, David Clayton and R. Christopher White	Nominated
Teen Choice Awards	Choice Movie: Sci-Fi/Fantasy		Nominated
Online Whale Awards	Best Supporting Lead Actor	Richard Armitage	Won
Online Whale Awards	Best Supporting Lead Actress	Evangeline Lilly	Nominated
Online Whale Awards	Best Visual Effects in a Film	Joe Letteri, R. Christopher White, Eric Saindon, and David Clayton	Nominated
Online Whale Awards	Best Music in a Film	Howard Shore	Won
Online Whale Awards	Best Cinematography in a Film	Andrew Lesnie	Won
Online Whale Awards	Best Lead Actor in a Film	Martin Freeman	Won
Online Whale Awards	Best Script for a Film	Fran Walsh, Peter Jackson, Philippa Boyens, and Guillermo del Toro	Won
Online Whale Awards	Best Film of the Year	Peter Jackson, Fran Walsh, Carolynne Cunningham, and Zane Weiner	Nominated
Annie Awards	Outstanding Achievement, Animated Effects in a Live Action Production	Ronnie Menahem, Brian Goodwin, Jason Lazaroff, Paul Harris and James Ogle	Nominated
Annie Awards	Outstanding Achievement, Character Animation in a Live Action Production	Aaron Gilman, Howard Sly, Matthew Riordan, Kevin Kelm and Guillaume Francois (for Azog)	Nominated
Annie Awards	Outstanding Achievement, Character Animation in a Live Action Production	David Clayton, Gios Johnston, Andreja Vuckovic, Guillaume Francois and Daniel Zettl (for Smaug)	Nominated

== See also ==
- List of accolades received by The Lord of the Rings film series
- 2012 in film
- 2013 in film
- 2014 in film
