= Melanie Crump =

British professional celebrity hair and makeup artist

- Born: July 1981; Bath, England
- Occupation(s): Founder and Academy Principal of Bath Academy of Media Makeup Celebrity Makeup Artist

Melanie Crump (born July 1981) is a British professional celebrity hair and makeup artist, makeup tutor, founder and Academy Principal of the Bath Academy of Media Makeup and former team member of reality television show Most Haunted.

== Biography ==
Born in the historic city of Bath, England, Melanie Crump trained as a professional makeup artist in London. Since 2002 she has worked extensively in fashion, television drama, music, news, sports, entertainment and current affairs. Melanie runs a series of makeup workshops at exclusive venues and lectures at various colleges and universities across the UK. In 2012 she returned to her home city to establish the Bath Academy of Media Makeup (BAMM), an elite training school for makeup artistry.

== Bath Academy of Media Makeup ==
In 2012 Melanie launched her own elite school for Makeup Artistry training - BAMM. In early 2013 Academy and BAFTA Award Winning makeup designer, Peter Swords King joined BAMM to work alongside Melanie as the Artistic Director.

== Most Haunted ==
In 2013 Melanie joined the team of reality television show Most Haunted and appeared onscreen alongside presenter Yvette Fielding throughout Series 16.

== Causes ==
Through BAMM, Melanie Crump teamed with Peter Swords King and The Body Shop to search for top makeup talent through the 'BAMM Recreate Competition'. The aim of the competition was to raise awareness for the Teenage Cancer Trust and to generate funding for the first specialist cancer unit for young people in the South West of England.
