= The Lord of the Rings: The Two Towers =

2002 film by Peter Jackson

- Theatrical release poster
- Directed by: Peter Jackson
- Screenplay by: Fran Walsh; Philippa Boyens; Stephen Sinclair; Peter Jackson
- Based on: The Two Towers by J. R. R. Tolkien
- Produced by: Barrie M. Osborne; Fran Walsh; Peter Jackson
- Starring: Elijah Wood; Ian McKellen; Liv Tyler; Viggo Mortensen; Sean Astin; Cate Blanchett; John Rhys-Davies; Bernard Hill; Christopher Lee; Billy Boyd; Dominic Monaghan; Orlando Bloom; Hugo Weaving; Miranda Otto; David Wenham; Brad Dourif; Karl Urban; Andy Serkis
- Cinematography: Andrew Lesnie
- Edited by: Michael J. Horton
- Music by: Howard Shore
- Production companies: WingNut Films; New Line Cinema
- Distributed by: New Line Cinema
- Release dates: 5 December 2002 (Ziegfeld Theatre); 18 December 2002 (United States); 19 December 2002 (New Zealand)
- Running time: 179 minutes
- Countries: New Zealand; United States
- Language: English
- Budget: $94 million
- Box office: $945.1 million

The Lord of the Rings: The Two Towers is a 2002 epic fantasy film directed by Peter Jackson from a screenplay by Fran Walsh, Philippa Boyens, Stephen Sinclair, and Jackson, based on 1954's The Two Towers, the second volume of the novel The Lord of the Rings by J. R. R. Tolkien. The sequel to 2001's The Lord of the Rings: The Fellowship of the Ring, the film is the second instalment in the Lord of the Rings trilogy. It features an ensemble cast including Elijah Wood, Ian McKellen, Liv Tyler, Viggo Mortensen, Sean Astin, Cate Blanchett, John Rhys-Davies, Bernard Hill, Christopher Lee, Billy Boyd, Dominic Monaghan, Orlando Bloom, Hugo Weaving, Miranda Otto, David Wenham, Brad Dourif, Karl Urban, and Andy Serkis. Continuing the plot of the previous film, it intercuts three storylines: Frodo and Sam continue their journey toward Mordor to destroy the One Ring, now allied with Gollum, the ring's untrustworthy former bearer; Merry and Pippin escape their orc captors, meet Treebeard the Ent, and help to plan an attack on Isengard, the fortress of Sauron's vassal, the treacherous wizard Saruman; Aragorn, Legolas, and Gimli come to the war-torn nation of Rohan and are reunited with the resurrected Gandalf, before joining king Théoden to fight Saruman's army at the Battle of Helm's Deep.

The Two Towers was financed and distributed by American studio New Line Cinema, but filmed and edited entirely in Jackson's native New Zealand, concurrently with the other two parts of the trilogy. It premiered on 5 December 2002 at the Ziegfeld Theatre in New York City and was released in the United States on 18 December and in New Zealand on 19 December. The film was acclaimed by critics and audiences, who considered it a landmark in filmmaking and an achievement in the fantasy film genre, with praise for the visual effects (Gollum), performances, action sequences, direction, and musical score. It grossed $923 million worldwide during its original theatrical run, making it the highest-grossing film of 2002 and, at the time of its release, the third-highest-grossing film of all time without adjustment for inflation, behind Titanic and Harry Potter and the Philosopher's Stone. Following subsequent re-releases, it has grossed $944 million.

Like the other films in the trilogy, The Two Towers is widely recognised as one of the greatest and most influential films ever made as well as one of the greatest sequels in cinema history. The film received numerous accolades; at the 75th Academy Awards, it was nominated for six awards, including Best Picture, winning for Best Sound Editing and Best Visual Effects. The final instalment of the trilogy, The Return of the King, was released in 2003.

== Plot ==
Awakening from a dream of Gandalf fighting the Balrog in Moria, (Note: As depicted in The Lord of the Rings: The Fellowship of the Ring) Frodo Baggins and Samwise Gamgee, find themselves lost in the Emyn Muil near Mordor. They discover they are being pursued by Gollum, a former bearer of the One Ring. After capturing Gollum, Frodo takes pity on him and lets him guide them into Mordor, despite Sam's reservations.

Aragorn, Legolas, and Gimli pursue a band of Uruk-hai to save their companions Merry and Pippin, entering the kingdom of Rohan. A group of Rohirrim ambush the Uruk-hai, allowing Merry and Pippin to escape into Fangorn Forest. When they meet Aragorn's group, Rohirrim leader Éomer explains that Rohan's king, Théoden, has exiled him and his men and that Saruman and his servant Gríma Wormtongue control him. Éomer believes Merry and Pippin were killed during the raid but leaves the group with two horses. In Fangorn, Aragorn's group confronts Gandalf, who, after killing the Balrog at the cost of his own life, was revived to help save Middle-earth.

Gandalf leads the trio to Rohan's capital, Edoras, and frees Théoden from Saruman's control. Aragorn stops Théoden from executing Wormtongue, who flees. Théoden evacuates the citizens to Helm's Deep as Saruman sends an army of Uruk-hai to intercept them. Gandalf seeks out Éomer and his followers, urging them to support their king. Aragorn connects with Théoden's niece, Éowyn, who becomes infatuated with him. When Saruman's Warg-riding Orcs attack the refugees, Aragorn falls and is presumed dead, but he has visions of Arwen before his horse, Brego, finds him. He rides to Helm's Deep as Saruman's army approaches the fortress.

In Rivendell, her father, Elrond, tells Arwen Aragorn will not return. He reminds her that if she remains in Middle-earth, she will outlive Aragorn by thousands of years, and she reluctantly departs for Valinor. Galadriel of Lothlórien contacts Elrond, convinces him that the Elves should honour their alliance to men, and they dispatch a company of Elves to Helm's Deep.

In Fangorn, Merry and Pippin meet Treebeard, an Ent. After convincing Treebeard they are allies, they are brought to an Ent council, where the Ents decide not to join the coming war. Pippin asks Treebeard to take them to Isengard, where they witness the deforestation caused by Saruman's war effort; enraged, Treebeard and the Ents storm Isengard, flooding the deforestation operations and trapping Saruman in his tower.

Aragorn arrives at Helm's Deep, warning Théoden of Saruman's army. Théoden prepares for battle despite being outnumbered. A company of Lothlorien Elves arrives to aid Rohan just before the attack. The Uruk-hai breach the outer wall with explosives and kill the Elves' commander, Haldir, in the charge. The defenders retreat to the keep, where Aragorn convinces Théoden to make a final charge. At dawn, Gandalf and Éomer arrive with the Rohirrim, turning the tide of battle. Gandalf warns that Sauron will retaliate.

Gollum leads Frodo and Sam to the Black Gate but recommends another route into Mordor. Rangers led by Faramir, the late Boromir's younger brother, capture Frodo and Sam. Frodo helps Faramir catch Gollum, saving him from the Rangers who want to kill him. Learning of the One Ring, Faramir takes his captives to Gondor to bring the Ring to his father, Denethor. As they pass through the besieged city of Osgiliath, Sam warns Faramir that the Ring's power drove Boromir mad. A Nazgûl nearly captures Frodo, but Sam saves him and reminds a disheartened Frodo that they are fighting for the good still left in Middle-earth. Impressed by Frodo's resolve, Faramir releases them. Feeling betrayed by his capture, Gollum decides to reclaim the Ring by leading Frodo and Sam to "her" upon arriving at Cirith Ungol.

== Cast ==
From left to right: Karl Urban, Bernard Hill, Ian McKellen, Orlando Bloom, and Viggo Mortensen. According to Peter Jackson, The Two Towers is centred around Aragorn.

Like the other films in the series, The Two Towers has an ensemble cast, including:

- Viggo Mortensen as Aragorn: The heir-in-exile to Gondor's throne who has come to Rohan's defence.
- Elijah Wood as Frodo Baggins: A young hobbit sent on a quest to destroy the One Ring, the burden of which is becoming heavier.
- Sean Astin as Samwise Gamgee: Better known as Sam, Frodo's loyal hobbit gardener and companion.
- Andy Serkis as Gollum (voice/motion capture): A wretched hobbit-like (Note: Frodo calls Gollum "not so very different from a hobbit once". In the book, however, Sméagol is described as belonging to "hobbit-kind; akin to the fathers of the fathers of the hobbit Stoors" (Tolkien, J. R. R. (1954a). The Fellowship of the Ring. The Lord of the Rings. Boston: Houghton Mifflin. OCLC 9552942., "The Shadow of the Past"); Stoors being one of the three kindreds of hobbits. In an appendix, Tolkien calls his relative Déagol Nahald (featured in the third film of the trilogy) a Stoor; therefore Sméagol must have been a Stoor himself. In a letter, Tolkien confirms that Gollum was a hobbit. Carpenter 2023, #214 to A. C. Nunn, 1958–9).) monster originally known as Sméagol, who owned the Ring for 500 years and now guides Frodo on his quest.
- Ian McKellen as Gandalf the White: An Istari wizard who fell fighting a Balrog and has now returned, more powerful than ever, to finish his task.
- John Rhys-Davies as Gimli: A dwarf warrior and one of Aragorn's companions.
  - Also voices Treebeard: The leader of the ents, who is roused to anger after seeing that Saruman had decimated a large part of Fangorn Forest.
- Orlando Bloom as Legolas: An elven archer and one of Aragorn's companions.
- Christopher Lee as Saruman the White: An Istari wizard waging war upon Rohan and devastating Fangorn Forest, who allied himself with Sauron in the previous film.
- Bernard Hill as Théoden: The King of Rohan, who is under Saruman's spell until Gandalf heals him so he can lead his people once more. Kevin Conway was offered the role but he declined.
- Billy Boyd as Peregrin Took: An extremely foolish hobbit who is a distant cousin of Frodo and travels with the Fellowship on their journey to Mordor.
- Dominic Monaghan as Meriadoc Brandybuck: Better known as Merry, a distant cousin of Frodo's who is mistakenly captured along with Pippin by the Uruk-hai.
- Brad Dourif as Gríma Wormtongue: An agent of Saruman at Edoras, who renders Théoden incapable of making decisions, and desires Éowyn.
- Miranda Otto as Éowyn: Théoden's niece, who is in love with Aragorn. Uma Thurman was offered the role but turned it down and later regretted it.
- David Wenham as Faramir: A prince of the Stewards of Gondor and captain of the Ithilien Rangers, who captures Frodo, Sam and Gollum.
- Karl Urban as Éomer: Théoden's nephew and previous Chief Marshal of the Riddermark who was exiled by Gríma.
- Liv Tyler as Arwen: An elven princess of Rivendell and Aragorn's true love.
- Hugo Weaving as Elrond: The Elven-Lord of Rivendell who expresses doubt over his daughter's love for Aragorn.
- Cate Blanchett as Galadriel: The Elven-Queen of Lothlórien, who discusses Middle-earth's future with Elrond.
- Sean Bean as Boromir: Faramir's older brother and a fallen member of the Fellowship who appears in flashbacks since his death, more prominently in the film's extended edition.
- Craig Parker as Haldir: The leader of the Lórien Elves sent by Elrond and Galadriel to defend Helm's Deep.
- John Leigh as Háma: The loyal doorwarden of the Golden Hall and a majordomo of Théoden.
- Bruce Hopkins as Gamling: Théoden's chief lieutenant and a skilled member of the Royal Guard of Rohan.
- John Bach as Madril: Faramir's closest aide, who informs him of battle preparations.
- Nathaniel Lees as Ugluk: The leader of the band of Uruk-hai who abducted Merry and Pippin.

The following appear only in the Extended Edition

- John Noble as Denethor: The Steward of Gondor and the father of Boromir and Faramir.

In the Battle of Helm's Deep, Peter Jackson has a cameo appearance as one of the men on top of the gate, throwing a spear at the attacking Uruk-hai. His children and Elijah Wood's sister cameo as young refugees in the caves behind the Hornburg, and Alan Lee and Dan Hennah also cameo as soldiers preparing for the battle. The son of a producer's friend, Hamish Duncan, appears as a reluctant young Rohirrim warrior. Daniel Falconer has a cameo as an Elvish archer at the battle.

== Comparison with source material ==
Screenwriters did not originally script The Two Towers as its own film; The Lord of the Rings trilogy was initially written as a two-part series to be produced by Miramax, with parts of The Two Towers written as the conclusion to The Fellowship of the Ring.

On the way to Helm's Deep, the refugees from Edoras are attacked by Wargs, similar to a scene in The Fellowship of the Ring where the Fellowship battles a group of Wargs. Here, a new subplot is created where Aragorn falls over a cliff, and is assumed to be dead; Jackson stated that he added it to create tension.

A larger change was originally planned: Arwen and Elrond would visit Galadriel, and Arwen would accompany an army of Elves to Helm's Deep to fight alongside Aragorn. During shooting, the script changed, both from writers coming up with better ideas to portray the romance between Aragorn and Arwen, as well as poor fan reaction. The new scene of Arwen leaving for the West was created, and the conversation scene remains, edited to be a flashback to a conversation between them in Rivendell, on the evening before the Fellowship's departure. A conversation between Elrond and Galadriel in Lothlórien was edited to be a telepathic one. Nonetheless, one major change (already filmed) remained that could not be reversed: the Elven warriors fighting at Helm's Deep, although Jackson and Boyens found this romantic and stirring and a reference to how, in the Appendices of The Return of the King, Galadriel and the Elves of Lothlórien, and Thranduil of Mirkwood were first attacked by an army out of Dol Guldur in Mirkwood, and then later counter-attacked and assaulted the fortress itself. Another change is the fact that Treebeard does not immediately decide to go to war. This adds to the tension, and Boyens describes it as making Merry and Pippin "more than luggage".

The filmmakers' decision to leave Shelob for the third film meant that Faramir had to become an obstacle for Frodo and Sam. In the book, Faramir (like Aragorn) quickly recognises the Ring as a danger and a temptation and does not hesitate long before letting Frodo and Sam go. In the film, Faramir first decides that the Ring shall go to Gondor and his father Denethor, as a way to prove his worth. In the film, Faramir takes Frodo, Sam, and the Ring to the Battle of Osgiliath—they do not go there in the book. After seeing how strongly the Ring affects Frodo during the Nazgûl attack, Faramir changes his mind and lets them go. These changes reshape the book's contrast between Faramir and Boromir, who in The Fellowship of the Ring attempted to take the Ring for himself. On the other hand, (which can be seen only in the film's extended version), it is actually their father who wants the Ring and urges Boromir to get it, while Faramir only wants to prove himself to his father. Boyens contends these plot changes were needed to keep the Ring menacing. Wenham commented on the DVD documentaries that he had not read the book prior to reading the script, so the film's version of Faramir was the Faramir he knew. When he later read the book and noticed the major difference, he approached the writers about it, and they explained to him that if he did say "I wouldn't pick that thing up even if it lay by the wayside", it would basically strip the One Ring of all corruptive power.

The meaning of the title itself, 'The Two Towers', was changed. While Tolkien considered several possible sets of towers he eventually created a final cover illustration and wrote a note included at the end of The Fellowship of the Ring which identified them as Minas Morgul and Orthanc. Jackson's film names them instead as Orthanc and Barad-dûr, symbolic of an evil alliance out to destroy Men that forms the film's plot point. The film depicted Saruman openly presenting himself outright as Sauron's servant, whereas this association was not explicitly stated in the novel (and indeed analysis by Gandalf and Aragorn in the chapter "The White Rider" stated that there was a rivalry instead, as Saruman was afraid of the prospect of being at war with Sauron, if Rohan and Gondor fell).

== Production ==
=== Production design ===
When Alan Lee joined the project in late 1997, Helm's Deep was the first structure he was tasked to design. At 1:35 scale, it was one of the first miniatures built for the film, and was part of the 45-minute video that sold the project to New Line Cinema. It was primarily drawn from an illustration Lee had once done for the book, though the curved wall featured in the film was proposed by fellow illustrator and designer John Howe. Used in the film for wide shots, Jackson also used this miniature to plan the battle, using 40,000 toy soldiers.

Helm's Deep, a pivotal part of the film's narrative, was built at Dry Creek Quarry with its gate, a ramp, and a wall, which included a removable section as well as the tower on a second level. A 1:4-scale miniature of Helm's Deep that ran 50 feet (15 m) wide was used for forced perspective shots, as well as the major explosion sequence.

The film explores the armies of Middle-earth. John Howe was the basic designer of the evil forces of Middle-Earth, with the Uruk-hai being the first army approved by Jackson. Howe also designed a special crossbow for the Uruk-Hai characters, which was significant because it did not require external tools to rearm. Also created were 100 Elven suits of armour, for which emphasis was placed on Autumnal colours due to the theme of Elves leaving Middle-earth. Two hundred and fifty suits were also made for the Rohirrim. The designs for Rohan were based on Germanic and Anglo-Saxon patterns, with most of the weapons designed by John Howe and forged by Peter Lyon. Each sword took 3 to 6 days to make.

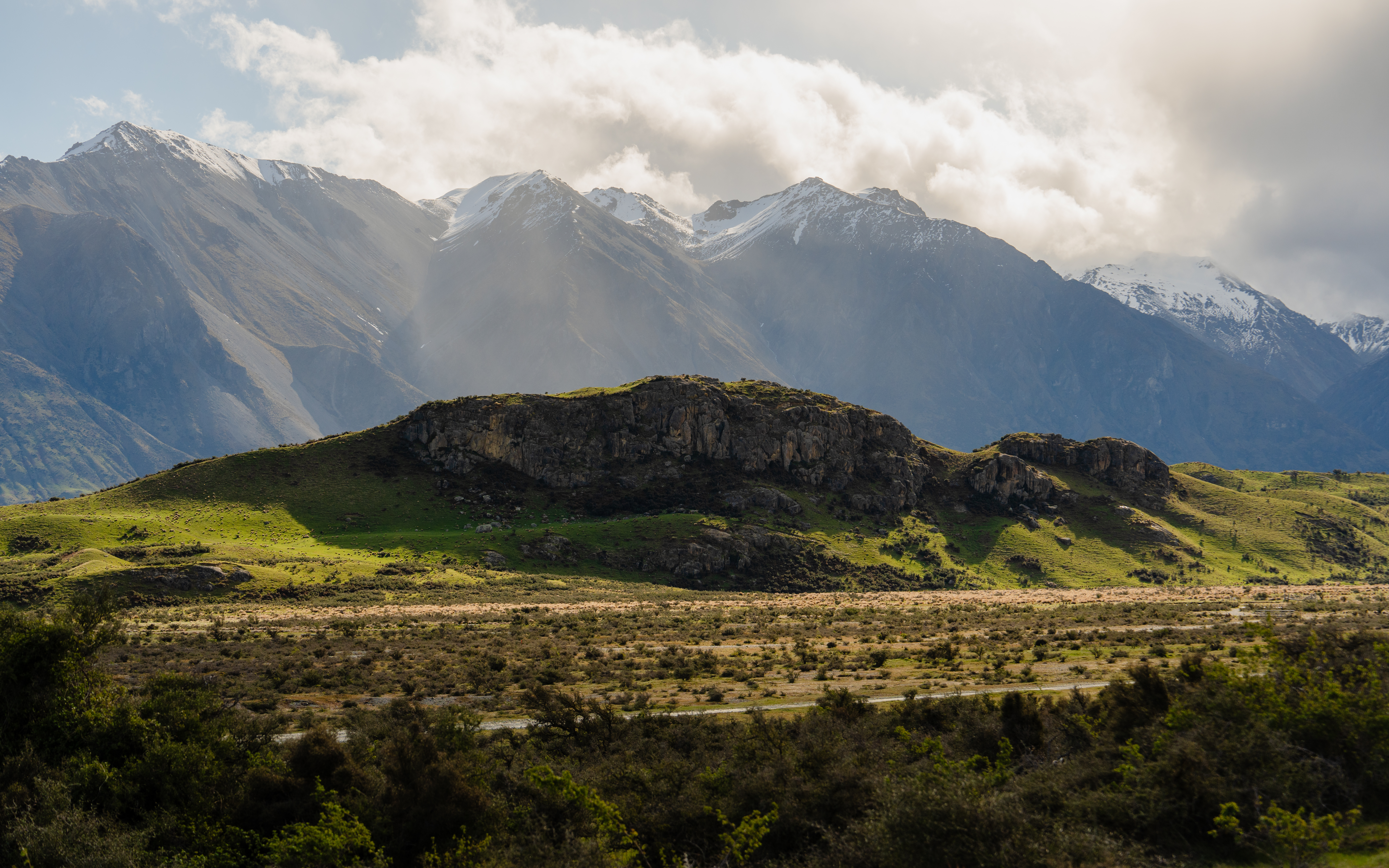
Mount Sunday in New Zealand's Canterbury Region of South Island provided the location for Edoras.

The exterior of the Rohirrim's capital of Edoras, including its thatched roofs, took six months to build on Mount Sunday. The interior of the buildings doubled as offices and lunch halls. The interior of the Hall of Edoras was filmed at Stone Street Studios with tapestries designed by Lee, and Théoden's wooden throne was partly created by his daughter. Through Frodo and Sam's story, the film also provides a look at Mordor and Gondor. Barad-dûr is fully seen in a tracking shot, a design which Howe called a mockery of Gothic Cathedrals. He and Lee created the Black Gate (though a typo in the script made the miniature into two) and Osgiliath, a ruined city reflecting London during the Blitz or Berlin in 1945. The set on a backlot was based around a bridge and reused some of Moria.

=== Principal photography ===
The Two Towers shared principal photography with The Fellowship of the Ring and The Return of the King. The trilogy was filmed between 11 October 1999 and 22 December 2000. The scenes which take place in Rohan were shot earlier in the production, during which time Viggo Mortensen, Orlando Bloom and John Rhys-Davies's stunt double Brett Beattie sustained many injuries. Mortensen broke two toes when he kicked an Orc helmet while filming the scene in which he, Legolas, and Gimli find the remains of the Uruk-hai and believe Merry and Pippin to be dead (a shot which is included in the film). Furthermore, during filming Bloom fell off his horse and cracked three ribs, and Beattie dislocated his knee. These injuries led to the actors suffering two days of pain during the running sequence in the first act of the film, leading Jackson to jokingly refer to them as "The Walking Wounded."

The filming of the Battle of Helm's Deep took approximately three months, with most of the nighttime shots handled by John Mahaffie. Some injuries were sustained during the filming of the sequence, including Mortensen chipping his tooth, and Bernard Hill's ear getting slashed. The sequence also features 500 extras, who insulted each other in Māori, and improvised scenes such as the Uruk-hai stamping their spears before the beginning of the battle. However, there was alleged annoyance among the film's crew for the strength of the gates, which were claimed to be too reinforced during the Battering Ram scene. Mortensen greatly respected the stunt team, and head bumped them often as a sign of that respect. Wood and Astin were joined by Serkis on 13 April 2000. Brad Dourif reportedly spent considerable time researching and developing the British accent used for his portrayal of Gríma Wormtongue, reflecting the broader convention in fantasy cinema of using British accents for characters in medieval-inspired settings.

=== Special effects ===
As with The Fellowship of the Ring, Jim Rygiel served as the visual effects supervisor for The Two Towers, while newcomer Joe Letteri joined the visual effects team to supervise Andy Serkis's motion capture performance in the creation of the character Gollum. During the production of The Two Towers Weta Digital doubled their staff of 260. In total, they have produced 73 minutes of digital effects with 800 shots. The film featured their first challenge in creating a battle scene, as well as creating two digital characters who needed to act rather than be a set piece, unlike the previous film's Cave Troll and Balrog.

Gollum

Weta began animating Gollum in late 1998 to convince New Line they could achieve the effect. Serkis "played" Gollum by providing his voice and movements on set, as well as performing in the motion capture suit later on. His scenes were filmed twice, with and without him. Originally, Gollum was set to be solely a CGI character, but Jackson was so impressed by Serkis' audition tape that they used him on set as well. Gollum's CGI model was also redesigned in 2001 when Serkis was cast as Sméagol, Gollum's former self, to give the impression that Andy Serkis as Sméagol transforms into the CGI Gollum. The original model can still be glimpsed briefly in the first film. Over Christmas 2001, the crew reanimated all the previous shots accordingly within two months. Another problem was that the crew realized that the cast performed better in the takes that physically included Serkis. In the end, the CGI Gollum was rotoscoped and animated on top of these scenes. Serkis's motion capture was generally used to animate Gollum's body, except for some difficult shots such as him crawling upside down. Gollum's face was animated manually, often using recordings of Serkis as a guide. Gino Acevedo supervised realistic skin tones, which took four hours per frame to render.

While the novel alludes to a division within his mind, the film depicts him as having a split personality. The two personas—the childlike Sméagol and the evil Gollum—are established during "perhaps the most celebrated scene" in the film, in which they argue over remaining loyal to Frodo. The two personalities talk to each other, as established by contrasting camera angles and by Serkis altering his voice and physicality for each persona. The key scene, which Peter Jackson has called one of his favorites, depicting the inner struggle was written and directed by Fran Walsh.

Treebeard

Treebeard took between 28 and 48 hours per frame to render. For scenes where he interacts with Merry and Pippin, a 14-foot-tall puppet was built on a wheel. Weta took polyurethane moulds of tree bark and applied them to the sculpt of Treebeard to create his wooden skin. Dominic Monaghan and Billy Boyd sat on bicycle seats concealed in Treebeard's hands to avoid discomfort and were left alone on set sitting in the puppet's hands during breaks. The puppet was shot against bluescreen.

=== Music ===
The musical score for The Two Towers was composed, orchestrated, and conducted by Howard Shore, who also composed the music for the other two films in the series. The scores for its predecessor and sequel won Academy Awards for Best Score, but the soundtrack for The Two Towers was not nominated. Initially there was confusion over the score's eligibility due to a new rule applying to sequels, but the academy declared it eligible.

The music is performed by the London Philharmonic Orchestra, London Voices, the London Oratory School Schola and several vocal and instrumental soloists, including soprano Isabel Bayrakdarian and Irish fiddler and violinist Dermot Crehan, who also played the Hardanger fiddle, used in conjunction with the various Rohan themes. The soundtrack was recorded at Abbey Road Studios.

The funeral song that Éowyn sings during her cousin Théodred's entombment in the extended edition is styled to be a traditional song of the Rohirrim and has lyrics in their language, Rohirric (represented by Old English). The text was written by Philippa Boyens, not by Tolkien, and was translated by David Salo. The tune is a variation on a theme of the rímur Icelandic folk tradition. (Note: The tune can be heard as part of track 7 in the 1999 recording of a musical version of the Edda by Sequentia.)

== Release ==
=== Marketing ===
The teaser trailer premiered in theatres on 3 July 2002 with the release of Men in Black II. The theatrical trailer was then released theatrically on 4 October 2002 with the debut of Red Dragon.

=== Home media ===
The Two Towers was released on VHS and DVD on 26 August 2003 in the United States by New Line Home Entertainment. The date was originally intended to be a simultaneous worldwide release, but due to a bank holiday weekend in the United Kingdom, some British outlets began selling DVDs as much as four days earlier, much to the ire of the UK distributor, Entertainment in Video, which had threatened to withhold advance supplies of subsequent DVD releases. During its first five days of release, the DVD release sold over 3.5 million units. The film also generated $22.8 million in rentals, breaking The Bourne Identity's record for having the biggest rentals of any DVD release. By December 2003, it was reported that The Two Towers sold 16.4 million copies and earned $305.4 million in sales revenue, becoming the second-highest selling home video release of 2003, after Finding Nemo. As with Fellowship, an extended edition of Two Towers was released on VHS and DVD on 18 November 2003 with 44 minutes of new material, added special effects and music, plus 12 minutes of fan-club credits. The runtime expanded to 235 minutes.

The theatrical Blu-ray version of The Lord of the Rings was released in the United States in April 2010. The individual disc of Two Towers was released in September 2010 with the same special features as the complete trilogy release, minus digital copy. The extended Blu-ray editions were released in the US and Canada in June 2011. Two Towers was released in Ultra HD Blu-ray on 30 November 2020 in the United Kingdom and on 1 December 2020 in the United States, along with the other instalments, including both theatrical and extended cuts.

== Reception ==
=== Box office ===
The Two Towers opened in theatres on 18 December 2002. During its opening day, the film grossed $26 million, making it the second-highest opening Wednesday, behind Star Wars: Episode I – The Phantom Menace. It earned $62 million in its opening weekend in the US and Canada, becoming the fifth-highest opening weekend of that year, behind Austin Powers in Goldmember, Star Wars: Episode II – Attack of the Clones, Harry Potter and the Chamber of Secrets, and Spider-Man. This was the third-highest opening weekend for a New Line Cinema film, trailing only behind Rush Hour 2 and Austin Powers in Goldmember. The film then made $101.5 million during its five-day Wednesday opening. The Two Towers reached the number one spot at the box office upon its debut, beating Maid in Manhattan, Two Weeks Notice, Gangs of New York, and The Wild Thornberrys Movie. It topped the box office for three weekends before it was dethroned by Just Married.

Outside the US and Canada, The Two Towers earned $99.4 million from 25 countries during its opening weekend, making it the highest international opening weekend. The combined total opening weekend gross increased to $189.9 million, making it the highest worldwide opening weekend of all time. The film would hold both records until 2003 when they were given to The Matrix Reloaded and its successor The Matrix Revolutions respectively. The Two Towers set opening day records in Germany, Austria, Finland, the Netherlands, Switzerland, Belgium, Sweden and Norway, as well as a single-day record in Denmark. It then made opening weekend records in the United Kingdom, Spain, France, Mexico, Norway, Switzerland, Denmark, Germany and South Korea. In the Netherlands, it surpassed Harry Potter and the Philosopher's Stone to have the country's highest opening weekend, making $2.2 million in just four days. The film collected $13.7 million in the United Kingdom during its opening weekend, combined with $20.9 million from its first five days, reaching the number one spot ahead of Die Another Day, Harry Potter and the Chamber of Secrets, The Santa Clause 2 and Sweet Home Alabama. It topped the box office for a total of four weeks until it was overtaken by 8 Mile.

The film went on to gross $348.9 million in North America and $592.7 million internationally for a worldwide total of $942.3 million against a budget of $94 million. The Two Towers was the highest-grossing film of 2002 worldwide. Box Office Mojo estimates over 57 million tickets sold in the US in its initial theatrical run.

Following subsequent reissues, the film has grossed $350 million in the United States and Canada and $593 million in the rest of the world for a worldwide total of $944 million.

=== Critical response ===
On review aggregator Rotten Tomatoes, The Two Towers holds an approval rating of 95% based on 288 reviews. The website's critics' consensus reads, "The Two Towers balances spectacular action with emotional storytelling, leaving audiences both wholly satisfied and eager for the final chapter." Metacritic, which uses a weighted average, has assigned the film a score of 87 out of 100 based on 39 reviews, indicating "universal acclaim". Audiences polled by CinemaScore gave the film an average grade of "A" on an A+ to F scale, a grade up from the "A−" earned by the previous film.

Like its predecessor, The Two Towers was released to universal critical acclaim and is widely considered to be one of the greatest sequels in cinema history. Roger Ebert of the Chicago Sun-Times gave the film three stars out of four, describing it as "one of the most spectacular swashbucklers ever made", and stating "It is not faithful to the spirit of Tolkien and misplaces much of the charm and whimsy of the books, but it stands on its own as a visionary thriller". Nev Pierce for the BBC gave the film four stars out of five, and wrote that while it lacked "the first film's wow-factor", it surpassed The Fellowship of the Ring "in terms of wit, action and narrative drive". Pierce described Gollum as "the first believable CG character" and the Battle of Helm's Deep as "one of the finest, most expansive combat sequences ever filmed". Writing for The Observer, Philip French described The Two Towers as a "stunning visual epic". French commended the battle scenes and the visual style of the film, relating it to the paintings of "Caspar David Friedrich, the Pre-Raphaelites, Art Nouveau illustrations for children's books, and the apocalyptic biblical landscapes ... of the Victorian visionary John Martin". He concluded the review looking forward to the release of the final chapter, writing "This is likely to be happier, more decisive and infinitely more satisfying than anything that will happen to our world in the next 12 months."

Joe Morgenstern for The Wall Street Journal lauded the narrative construction of The Two Towers: "Elaborate preparations are required for the payoff in this instalment -- the massing of troops plus much individual struggle as splintered groups of the Fellowship make their separate ways toward the defining battle of Helm's Deep ... Yet these preparations count as payoffs too ... Seldom has a popular entertainment set its stage so carefully or evocatively, with such lavish respect for its audience." Morgenstern also highlighted the digital effects and the battle scenes, and said of the series "The Lord of the Rings continues to stake its singular claim on movie history; it's a gift of epic proportions." In his review for the Evening Standard, Alexander Walker wrote that the Battle of Helm's Deep was "probably the greatest battlepiece composed for the screen since Eisenstein's Ivan the Terrible", and that with The Two Towers the trilogy had achieved "a majestic proportion, chivalric and quixotic, earthly and magical, an experience that reaches beyond the dimensions of the cinema screen and somehow reflects the global unease of the world in the first years of the 21st century".

In his review for Newsweek, David Ansen commended Jackson's direction of the battle scenes, writing "Few people can stage a battle -- and the eyepopping siege of Helms Deep is one of the most spectacular you'll ever see -- with such sweep and clarity that the carnage doesn't seem an oppressive end in itself". Ansen also praised the complexity of the character of Gollum, commenting "While everyone else in Tolkien's myth falls neatly into the camps of Good and Evil, the self-lacerating Gollum is at war with himself. In an epic drenched in medievalism, he's the dangerously ambiguous voice of the modern." Caroline Westbrook, for Empire, gave the film five stars out of five, and wrote "It may lack the first-view-thrill and natural dramatic shape of Fellowship, but this is both funnier and darker than the first film, and certainly more action-packed. An essential component of what is now destined to be among the best film franchises of all time." Westbrook lauded Jackson's ability to temper the spectacular scenes "with some heartstring-tugging moments - peasants despondent as they are forced to abandon their villages, Aragorn and Arwen's troubled relationship, and, of course, the return of Gandalf (Sir Ian McKellen, superb as ever), one of the film's most powerful, memorable images that may well leave Ring devotees a little misty-eyed."

A less enthusiastic review was written in The Guardian by Peter Bradshaw, who had already written a mixed review of The Fellowship of the Ring. Bradshaw gave The Two Towers three stars out of five, appreciating it as "a very watchable, distinctive, if over-extended FX spectacle". However, he commented that the film could not be taken as "a serious evocation of good and evil", and dismissed the subject as "lots and lots of interminable nerdish nonsense".

The Battle of Helm's Deep has been named by CNN as one of the greatest screen battles of all time, while Gollum was named as the third favourite computer-generated film character by Entertainment Weekly in 2007.

In 2025, it ranked number 43 on the "Readers' Choice" edition of The New York Times' list of "The 100 Best Movies of the 21st Century."

=== Accolades ===
- Academy Awards
  - Winner: Best Visual Effects (Jim Rygiel, Joe Letteri, Randall William Cook and Alex Funke) and Best Sound Editing (Ethan Van der Ryn and Michael Hopkins).
  - Nominee: Best Picture (Fran Walsh, Philippa Boyens, Stephen Sinclair and Peter Jackson, producers), Best Art Direction (Art Direction: Grant Major; Set Decoration: Dan Hennah and Alan Lee), Best Film Editing (Michael J. Horton) and Best Sound (Christopher Boyes, Michael Semanick, Michael Hedges and Hammond Peek).
- British Academy Film Awards: Best Costume Design, Best Special Visual Effects, Orange Film of the Year (voted on by the public)
- Empire Awards: Best Picture
- Grammy Awards: Best Score (Howard Shore)
- Hugo Awards (World Science Fiction Society): Best Dramatic Presentation — Long Form
- 2003 MTV Movie Awards: Best virtual performance (Gollum)
- Saturn Awards: Best Fantasy Film, Best Costume (Ngila Dickson), Best Supporting Actor (Andy Serkis)

=== American Film Institute ===
- AFI's 100 Years...100 Movie Quotes:
  - "My precious." – #85

Award	Category	Recipient/Nominee	Result
Academy Awards	Best Picture	Barrie M. Osborne, Fran Walsh and Peter Jackson	Nominated
Academy Awards	Best Art Direction	Grant Major, Dan Hennah and Alan Lee	Nominated
Academy Awards	Best Film Editing	Michael J. Horton	Nominated
Academy Awards	Best Sound	Christopher Boyes, Michael Semanick, Michael Hedges and Hammond Peek	Nominated
Academy Awards	Best Sound Editing	Ethan Van der Ryn and Michael Hopkins	Won
Academy Awards	Best Visual Effects	Jim Rygiel, Joe Letteri, Randall William Cook and Alex Funke	Won
British Academy Film Awards	Best Film	Barrie M. Osborne, Fran Walsh and Peter Jackson	Nominated
British Academy Film Awards	Best Direction	Peter Jackson	Nominated
British Academy Film Awards	Best Cinematography	Andrew Lesnie	Nominated
British Academy Film Awards	Best Costume Design	Ngila Dickson and Richard Taylor	Won
British Academy Film Awards	Best Editing	Michael J. Horton	Nominated
British Academy Film Awards	Best Makeup and Hair	Peter Owen, Peter King and Richard Taylor	Nominated
British Academy Film Awards	Best Production Design	Grant Major	Nominated
British Academy Film Awards	Best Sound	Ethan Van der Ryn, David Farmer, Michael Hopkins, Hammond Peek, Christopher Boyes, Michael Semanick and Michael Hedges	Nominated
British Academy Film Awards	Best Special Visual Effects	Jim Rygiel, Joe Letteri, Randall William Cook and Alex Funke	Won
Golden Globe Awards	Best Motion Picture – Drama	The Lord of the Rings: The Two Towers	Nominated
Golden Globe Awards	Best Director	Peter Jackson	Nominated
Saturn Awards	Best Fantasy Film	The Lord of the Rings: The Two Towers	Won
Saturn Awards	Best Director	Peter Jackson	Nominated
Saturn Awards	Best Actor	Viggo Mortensen	Nominated
Saturn Awards	Best Supporting Actor	Andy Serkis	Won
Saturn Awards	Best Performance by a Younger Actor	Elijah Wood	Nominated
Saturn Awards	Best Writing	Fran Walsh, Philippa Boyens, Stephen Sinclair and Peter Jackson	Nominated
Saturn Awards	Best Costume Design	Ngila Dickson and Richard Taylor	Won
Saturn Awards	Best Make-up	Peter Owen and Peter King	Won
Saturn Awards	Best Music	Howard Shore	Nominated
Saturn Awards	Best Special Effects	Jim Rygiel, Joe Letteri, Randall William Cook and Alex Funke	Nominated

== See also ==
- List of films about witchcraft
- The Lord of the Rings: The Two Towers (video game)

== Sources ==
- Adams, Doug (2010). The Music of The Lord of the Rings Films. Éditions Didier Carpentier. ISBN 978-0-7390-7157-1.
- Carpenter, Humphrey, ed. (2023) [1981]. The Letters of J. R. R. Tolkien: Revised and Expanded Edition. New York: HarperCollins. ISBN 978-0-35-865298-4.
- Hammond, Wayne G.; Anderson, Douglas A. (1993). J. R. R. Tolkien: A Descriptive Bibliography. New Castle, DE: Oak Knoll Books. ISBN 0-938768-42-5.
- Hammond, Wayne G.; Scull, Christina (1995). J. R. R. Tolkien: Artist and Illustrator. Illustrated by J. R. R. Tolkien. Boston: Houghton Mifflin. ISBN 0-395-74816-X.
