= Bath Academy of Media Makeup =

- Founder: Melanie Crump
- Location: Bath, Somerset, England
- Key people: Peter Swords King - Artistic Director
- Website: www.bammakeup.com

The Bath Academy of Media Makeup (BAMM) is a private educational facility for makeup artistry training located in the historic city of Bath, England. The academy offers professional training courses in the medias of television, theatre, film, fashion and special effects makeup.

== History ==
The Bath Academy of Media Makeup was founded by Melanie Crump in 2012. In early 2013 the academy appointed Peter Swords King as its Artistic Director. The Bath Academy of Media Makeup was accredited by the British Accreditation Council (BAC) in March 2015 and accepts both UK and international students. In September 2015 the Academy became affiliated with the Bath Spa University.

== Peter Swords King ==
The Bath Academy of Media Makeup's Artistic Director is Academy and BAFTA award-winning makeup designer Peter Swords King.

== Causes ==
In June 2013 the Bath Academy of Media Makeup and Peter Swords King teamed up with The Body Shop to launch the "BAMM Recreate Competition" to search for up and coming talent in makeup artistry. The competition will raise awareness for the Teenage Cancer Trust (TCT) and generate funding that will be used to help build the first specialist cancer unit for young people in the South West of England.
