= Mark Stetson =

Visual Effects Artist

- Born: 1952 (age 73–74)
- Occupation: Visual effects artist
- Years active: 1979–present

Mark Stetson (born 1952) is a visual effects artist, specializing in miniature effects.

He has worked on over 60 films since his start in 1979.

== Partial filmography ==
Stetson has worked on over 60 films, including:

- Blade Runner (1982)
- Brainstorm (1983)
- The Right Stuff (1983)
- Ghostbusters (1984)
- 2010: The Year We Make Contact (1984), for which he was nominated for an Academy Award for Best Visual Effects
- Die Hard (1988)
- Dick Tracy (1990)
- Total Recall (1990)
- Batman Returns (1992)
- The Hudsucker Proxy (1994)
- Interview with the Vampire (1994)
- True Lies (1994)
- The Fifth Element (1997), for which he won a BAFTA award for visual effects
- The Lord of the Rings: The Fellowship of the Ring (2001), for which he won a BAFTA award for visual effects, and shared an Academy Award for Best Visual Effects (with Randall William Cook, Jim Rygiel, and Richard Taylor)
- Superman Returns (2006), for which he was nominated for an Academy Award for Best Visual Effects
