= Randall William Cook =

American special effects artist

- Born: United States
- Other names: Randy Cook
- Education: UCLA Film School
- Occupations: Visual effects artist; film actor; voice actor
- Years active: 1975–present

Randall William Cook is an American special effects artist, film actor, and voice actor most known for The Lord of the Rings trilogy. He worked on Ghostbusters, as designer, sculptor and animator of the 'Terror Dogs'; The Gate, as visual effects designer and director; King Kong as second unit director. He currently works as a consultant and is preparing several personal properties for production.

== Filmography ==
- King Kong - Second unit director

== Awards and recognition ==
Alongside Jim Rygiel, Cook won the Academy Award for Best Visual Effects for three consecutive years (2002, 2003 and 2004):

- 74th Academy Awards-The Lord of the Rings: The Fellowship of the Ring. Award shared with Jim Rygiel, Mark Stetson and Richard Taylor. Won.
- 75th Academy Awards-The Lord of the Rings: The Two Towers. Award shared with Alex Funke, Joe Letteri and Jim Rygiel. Won.
- 76th Academy Awards-The Lord of the Rings: The Return of the King. Award shared with Alex Funke, Joe Letteri and Jim Rygiel. Won.
