= Alex Funke =

American photographer

Alex Funke (born October 12, 1944, in Santa Barbara, California) is an American special effects photographer.

Alex Funke is best known for his work on both of Peter Jackson's Middle-earth film trilogies, The Lord of the Rings (2001–2003) and The Hobbit (2012–2014).

== Career ==
He worked with Charles and Ray Eames for eleven years, a period he deemed important to his career success. His first Oscar was a shared win for Total Recall. Funke became noted as an expert on miniatures and was brought to New Zealand for work on The Lord of the Rings film trilogy. At the 75th and 76th Academy Awards, he won Best Visual Effects for his work on The Lord of the Rings: The Two Towers and The Lord of the Rings: The Return of the King, respectively. He shared both awards with Jim Rygiel, Joe Letteri, and Randall William Cook.

== Selected filmography ==
- 1977 – Powers of Ten
- 1978 – Battlestar Galactica
- 1979 – Buck Rogers
- 1981 – Heavy Metal
- 1988 – The Blob
- 1989 – The Abyss
- 1990 – Total Recall - Shared an Academy Special Achievement Award for this.
- 1991 – Grand Canyon
- 1992 – Freejack
- 1992 – The Lawnmower Man
- 1995 – The Indian in the Cupboard
- 1995 – Waterworld
- 1996 – Executive Decision
- 1996 – The Lawnmower Man 2: Beyond Cyberspace
- 1997 – Starship Troopers
- 1998 – Snake Eyes
- 1998 – Mighty Joe Young
- 1999 – Mystery Men
- 2001 – The Lord of the Rings: The Fellowship of the Ring
- 2002 – The Lord of the Rings: The Two Towers
- 2003 – The Lord of the Rings: The Return of the King
- 2005 – King Kong
- 2008 – The Chronicles of Narnia: Prince Caspian
- 2015 – Fast & Furious 7
- 2017 – Blade Runner 2049
