= Hammond Peek =

New Zealand sound engineer

- Occupation: Sound engineer
- Years active: 1982–present

Hammond Peek is a New Zealand sound engineer. He has won two Academy Awards for Best Sound and has been nominated for another two in the same category. Of Māori descent, Peek affiliates to Ngāi Tahu and Te Āti Awa.

== Selected filmography ==
Peek has won two Academy Awards and has been nominated for another two :

Won

- The Lord of the Rings: The Return of the King (2003)
- King Kong (2005)

Nominated

- The Lord of the Rings: The Fellowship of the Ring (2001)
- The Lord of the Rings: The Two Towers (2002)
