= Jason Canovas =

20th century British sound editor

- Born: Wallasey, England
- Occupation: Sound editor
- Years active: 1993–present
- Children: 2

Jason Canovas is a British sound editor. He currently lives in Wellington, New Zealand

== Career ==
Canovas was nominated for an Academy Award for Best Sound Editing at the 87th Academy Awards for his work on the film The Hobbit: The Battle of the Five Armies; his nomination was shared with Brent Burge.

== Personal life ==
Canovas supports Tranmere Rovers.
