= Peter King (make-up artist) =

British make-up artist

- Born: Peter Swords King; 1955 (age 70–71); UK
- Occupation: Makeup artist
- Years active: 1982–Present

Peter King (born 1955), also known as Peter Swords King, is a British Oscar-winning makeup artist who won at the 2003 Academy Awards for Best Makeup for the film The Lord of the Rings: The Return of the King. He shared the award with filmmaker Richard Taylor. He was nominated again at the 2012 Academy Awards for The Hobbit: An Unexpected Journey.

Besides bringing movie characters to life by way of make-up and hairstyling, King, for the 13 dwarves in the movie The Hobbit: An Unexpected Journey, had to work on 1,000 drawings before finalizing down to a single image. "We make the prosthetics, wigs, beards and then do a show-and-tell for each character in the film", was the remark made by Peter about his work. He is credited for his exemplary work of immortalizing characters like the King Kong and Marquis de Sade on celluloid.

His other movies include Quills, Thunderbirds Little Voice, The Importance of Being Earnest, An Ideal Husband and The Avengers.

King has also won several BAFTA Awards. He has worked on nearly 40 films since 1982.

King is artistic director at Bath Academy of Media Makeup, which is a private school for makeup artistry within media and fashion.
