= Jim Rygiel =

American visual effects supervisor

- Born: February 17, 1955 (age 70); Kenosha, Wisconsin, U.S.
- Occupation: Visual effects supervisor
- Known for: The Lord of the Rings; Godzilla

Jim Rygiel (born February 17, 1955) is an American visual effects supervisor. He has worked on major feature films since 1984, including The Lord of the Rings movie trilogy (for which he won three consecutive Academy Awards for Best Visual Effects) and Godzilla. He currently works at FuseFX visual effects studio.

== Early life ==
Rygiel was born in Kenosha, Wisconsin.

Rygiel attended St. Joseph Catholic High School in Kenosha, Wisconsin. He holds a Bachelor of Fine Arts from the University of Wisconsin–Milwaukee. In 1980, he received a Master of Fine Arts degree from Otis Parsons School of Design (now called Otis College of Art and Design).

== Career ==
=== Pacific Electric Pictures ===
Starting his career in 1980, Rygiel joined Pacific Electric Pictures, one of the earliest companies to employ computer animation for the advertising and film markets.

=== Digital Productions ===
In 1983, Rygiel's work took him to Digital Productions where he began work on The Last Starfighter (1984), a film notable for its pioneering use of digital imaging in place of models. While at Digital Productions, Rygiel's commercial work was nominated for numerous awards, winning a prestigious CLIO award for the introduction of the Sony Walkman.

=== Pacific Data Images and Metrolight ===
From 1987 to 1989, Rygiel supervised numerous projects while at visual effects companies Pacific Data Images (PDI) and Metrolight.

=== Boss Film Studios ===
In 1989, Rygiel was asked to form and head a computer animation department at Boss Film Studios. This department of one grew to over 75 animators and 100 support staff within a little more than a year, winning several awards, including a CLIO Award for the Geo Prism automobile commercial. While at Boss, Rygiel supervised many feature films, both as Digital Effects Supervisor and Visual Effects Supervisor.

His credits there include Starship Troopers, Species, Outbreak, Air Force One, The Scout, The Last Action Hero, Cliffhanger, Batman Returns, Alien III, and Ghost.

=== Post-Boss Films career ===
After Boss Films' closure, he went on to supervise The Parent Trap, Star Trek: Insurrection, Anna and the King, and 102 Dalmatians. In 2006, Rygiel co-founded Rocket Science Studios. He currently serves as president of production.

== Awards and nominations ==
In 2002, Rygiel received the American Film Institute's first AFI Digital Effects Artist of the Year award, the Academy Award and the British Academy of Film and Television Arts award for Best Visual Effects for his work on The Lord of the Rings: The Fellowship of the Ring. Rygiel is a member of the Academy of Motion Picture Arts and Sciences as well as the Academy of Television Arts & Sciences, and The British Academy of Film and Television Arts.
