= 47th Annual Grammy Awards =

2005 US music awards ceremony

- Date: February 13, 2005
- Location: Staples Center, Los Angeles
- Hosted by: Queen Latifah
- Most awards: Ray Charles & Al Schmitt (5)
- Most nominations: Kanye West (10)
- Website: https://www.grammy.com/awards/47th-annual-grammy-awards

Television/radio coverage
- Network: CBS

The 47th Annual Grammy Awards were held on February 13, 2005, at the Staples Center in Los Angeles honoring the best in music for the recording of the year beginning from October 1, 2003, through September 30, 2004. They were hosted by Queen Latifah, and televised in the United States by CBS. They recognized accomplishments by musicians from the previous year. Ray Charles, whom the event was dedicated in memory of, posthumously won five Grammy Awards while his album, Genius Loves Company, won a total of eight. Kanye West received the most nominations with ten, winning three. Usher received eight nominations and won three including Best Contemporary R&B Album for his diamond selling album Confessions. Britney Spears received her first Grammy of Best Dance Recording for her 2004 smash hit "Toxic".

== Performers ==
Performers
Artist(s)	Song
Black Eyed Peas; Gwen Stefani; Eve; Los Lonely Boys; Franz Ferdinand; Maroon 5	"Let's Get It Started" "Rich Girl" "Heaven" "Take Me Out" "This Love"
Stevie Wonder; Brian Wilson; Bono; Billie Joe Armstrong; Alicia Keys; Steven Tyler; Norah Jones; Tim McGraw; Alison Krauss; Velvet Revolver	Tribute for the 2004 Indian Ocean Tsunami "Across the Universe"
Alicia Keys; Jamie Foxx; Quincy Jones	Tribute for Ray Charles "If I Ain't Got You" "Georgia on My Mind"
Jennifer Lopez; Marc Anthony	"Escapemonos"
Melissa Etheridge; Joss Stone	Tribute for Janis Joplin "Cry Baby" "Piece of My Heart"
Mavis Staples; John Legend; Kanye West; The Blind Boys of Alabama	"I'll Take You There" "Jesus Walks" "I'll Fly Away"
U2	"Vertigo" "Sometimes You Can't Make It On Your Own"
Keith Urban; Gretchen Wilson; Dickey Betts; Elvin Bishop; Tim McGraw; Lynyrd Skynyrd	Tribute to Southern Rock "Free Bird" "Fooled Around And Fell In Love" "Ramblin' Man" "Sweet Home Alabama"
Green Day	"American Idiot"
Usher; James Brown	"Caught Up" "Sex Machine"
Bonnie Raitt; Billy Preston	"Do I Ever Cross Your Mind"

== Presenters ==
- Gary Sinise and Bonnie Raitt presented Album of the Year.
- Sheryl Crow and Lance Armstrong presented Record of the Year.
- Stevie Wonder and Norah Jones presented Song of the Year.
- Adam Sandler and Nelly presented Best Male R&B Vocal Performance.
- John Travolta, Christina Milian, and Steven Tyler presented Best Pop Performance by a Duo or Group with Vocal and announced that Pinetop Perkins is a Lifetime Achievement recipient.
- Amy Lee, Alison Krauss and T Bone Burnett presented Best Country Album.
- Rob Thomas presents Ahmed Ertegun with the first President's Merit Award Salute to Industry Icons.
- Ricky Martin, Anthony Hamilton and Mario presented Best R&B Album.
- Lisa Marie Presley and John Mayer presented Best Rock Performance by a Duo or Group with Vocal.
- Penelope Cruz, Mark McGrath and Pharrell presented Best Rock Album and announced that Led Zeppelin is a Lifetime Achievement recipient.
- Matthew McConaughey introduced a performance by Lynyrd Skynyrd, Keith Urban, Gretchen Wilson, Elvin Bishop, Dickie Betts, and Tim McGraw.
- Ellen DeGeneres introduces a performance by Queen Latifah.
- Quentin Tarantino introduces a performance by Green Day.
- Kris Kristofferson pays tribute to Janis Joplin and then introduces a performance by Joss Stone and Melissa Etheridge.
- Billy Bob Thornton pays tribute to Lifetime Achievement honoree Eddie Arnold and then introduces a performance by Tim McGraw.
- Anthony LaPaglia talks about the Southeast Asian tsunami.
- Kevin Bacon and Ludacris presented Best Rap Album.
- Tyra Banks and Hoobastank presented Best New Artist.

== Winners and nominees ==
Bold type indicates the winner out of the list of nominees.

=== General ===
Record of the Year

- **"Here We Go Again" – Ray Charles & Norah Jones**
  - **John Burk, producer; Al Schmitt, Mark Fleming, & Terry Howard, engineers/mixers**
- "Let's Get It Started" – The Black Eyed Peas
  - Will.i.am, producer; Mark "Spike" Stent & Will.i.am, engineers/mixers
- "American Idiot" – Green Day
  - Billie Joe Armstrong, Rob Cavallo, Mike Dirnt & Tré Cool, producers; Chris Lord-Alge & Doug McKean, engineers/mixers
- "Heaven" – Los Lonely Boys
  - John Porter, producer; Steve Chadie & John Porter, engineers/mixers
- "Yeah!" – Usher featuring Lil Jon & Ludacris
  - Jonathan "Lil Jon" Smith, producer; John Frye, Donnie Scantz, Jonathan "Lil Jon" Smith, The Trak Starz & Mark Vinten, engineers/mixers

Album of the Year

- **Genius Loves Company – Ray Charles & Various Artists**
  - **John Burk, Terry Howard, Don Mizell, Phil Ramone & Herbert Waltl, producers; Robert Fernandez, Mark Fleming, John Harris, Terry Howard, Pete Karam, Joel Moss, Seth Presant, Al Schmitt & Ed Thacker, engineers/mixers; Robert Hadley & Doug Sax, mastering engineers**
- American Idiot – Green Day
  - Billie Joe Armstrong, Rob Cavallo, Mike Dirnt & Tré Cool, producers; Chris Lord-Alge & Doug McKean, engineers/mixers; Ted Jensen, mastering engineer
- The Diary of Alicia Keys – Alicia Keys
  - Kerry "Krucial" Brothers, Vidal Davis, Easy Mo Bee, Andre Harris, Alicia Keys, Kumasi, Timbaland, Kanye West & Dwayne "D. Wigg" Wiggins, producers; Tony Black, Kerry "Krucial" Brothers, Vincent Dilorenzo, Russ Elevado, Manny Marroquin, Walter Millsap III, Ann Mincieli & Pat Viala, engineers/mixers; Herb Powers, Jr., mastering engineer
- Confessions – Usher
  - Bobby Ross Avila, Valdez Brantley, Bryan-Michael Cox, Vidal Davis, Destro Music, Jermaine Dupri, Andre Harris, Rich Harrison, IZ, Jimmy Jam, Just Blaze, James Lackey, Terry Lewis, Juan Johnny Najera, Pro J, Usher Raymond, Jonathan "Lil Jon" Smith, Aaron Spears, Arthur Strong, Thicke & James "Big Jim" Wright, producers; Ian Cross, Kevin "KD" Davis, Vidal Davis, Vince DeLorenzo, Jermaine Dupri, Blake Eisman, Brian Frye, John Frye, Serban Ghenea, Andre Harris, John Horesco IV, Ken Lewis, Matt Marrin, Manny Marroquin, Tony Maserati, Pro J, Donnie Scantz, Jon Smeltz, Jonathan "Lil Jon" Smith, Phil Tan, The Trak Starz, Mark Vinten & Ryan West, engineers/mixers; Herb Powers, mastering engineer
- The College Dropout – Kanye West
  - Kanye West, Kyambo “Hip Hop” Joshua, Brian “All Day” Miller, Evidence & Porse, producers; Eugene A. Toale, Andrew Dawson, Anthony Kilhoffer, Tatsuya Sato, Rich Balmer, Brent Kolatalo, Keith Slattery, Jacob Andrew, Gimel “Guru” Keaton, Jacelyn Parry, Michael Eleopoulos, Dave Dar, Jason Rauhoff, Marc Fuller, Carlisle Young, Francis Graham, Manny Marroquin, Jared Lopez, Mike Dean & Ken Lewis, engineers/mixers; Eddy Schreyer, mastering engineer

Song of the Year

- **"Daughters"**
  - **John Mayer, songwriter (John Mayer)**
- "If I Ain't Got You"
  - Alicia Keys, songwriter (Alicia Keys)
- "Jesus Walks"
  - C. Smith & Kanye West, songwriters (Kanye West)
- "Live Like You Were Dying"
  - Tim Nichols & Craig Wiseman, songwriters (Tim McGraw)
- "The Reason"
  - Daniel Estrin & Douglas Robb, songwriters (Hoobastank)

Best New Artist

- **Maroon 5**
- Los Lonely Boys
- Joss Stone
- Kanye West
- Gretchen Wilson

=== Pop ===
Best Female Pop Vocal Performance

- **"Sunrise" – Norah Jones**
- "The First Cut Is the Deepest" – Sheryl Crow
- "Oceania" – Björk
- "What You Waiting For?" – Gwen Stefani
- "You Had Me" – Joss Stone

Best Male Pop Vocal Performance

- **"Daughters" – John Mayer**
- "Let's Misbehave" – Elvis Costello
- "You Raise Me Up" – Josh Groban
- "Cinnamon Girl" – Prince
- "Love's Divine" – Seal

Best Pop Performance by a Duo or Group with Vocal

- **"Heaven" – Los Lonely Boys**
- "My Immortal" – Evanescence
- "The Reason" – Hoobastank
- "She Will Be Loved" – Maroon 5
- "It's My Life" – No Doubt

Best Pop Collaboration with Vocals

- **"Here We Go Again" – Ray Charles & Norah Jones**
- "Redemption Song" – Johnny Cash & Joe Strummer
- "Sorry Seems to Be the Hardest Word" – Ray Charles & Elton John
- "Something" – Paul McCartney & Eric Clapton
- "Moon River" – Stevie Wonder & Take 6

Best Pop Instrumental Performance

- **"11th Commandment" – Ben Harper**
- "Chasing Shadows" – Herb Alpert, Russ Freeman, James Genus, Gene Lake & Jason Miles
- "Take You Out" – George Benson
- "Song F" – Bruce Hornsby
- "Rat Pack Boogie" – Brian Setzer

Best Pop Instrumental Album

- **Henry Mancini: Pink Guitar – Various Artists; James Jensen, producer**
- Pure – Boney James
- Saxophonic – Dave Koz
- Forever, for Always, for Luther – Various Artists; Bud Harner & Rex Rideout, producers
- EP 2003: Music for the Epicurean Harkener – Mason Williams

Best Pop Vocal Album

- **Genius Loves Company – Ray Charles & Various Artists**
- Feels Like Home – Norah Jones
- Afterglow – Sarah McLachlan
- Mind Body & Soul – Joss Stone
- Brian Wilson Presents Smile – Brian Wilson

=== Dance ===
Best Dance Recording

- **"Toxic" – Britney Spears**
  - **Avant & Bloodshy, producers; Niklas Flyckt, mixer**
- "Good Luck" – Basement Jaxx featuring Lisa Kekaula
  - Basement Jaxx, producers; Basement Jaxx, mixers
- "Get Yourself High" – The Chemical Brothers
  - The Chemical Brothers, producers; The Chemical Brothers, mixers
- "Slow" – Kylie Minogue
  - Dan Carey & Emilíana Torrini, producers; Mr. Dan, mixer
- "Comfortably Numb" – Scissor Sisters
  - Scissor Sisters, producers; Neil Harris & Scissor Sisters, mixers

Best Electronic/Dance Album

- **Kish Kash – Basement Jaxx**
- Legion of Boom – The Crystal Method
- Creamfields – Paul Oakenfold
- Always Outnumbered, Never Outgunned – The Prodigy
- Reflections – Paul van Dyk

=== Traditional Pop ===
Best Traditional Pop Vocal Album

- **Stardust: The Great American Songbook, Volume III** – Rod Stewart
- Only You – Harry Connick Jr.
- Count Your Blessings – Barbara Cook
- Ultimate Mancini – Monica Mancini
- Just for a Thrill – Ronnie Milsap

=== Rock ===
Best Solo Rock Vocal Performance

- **"Code of Silence" – Bruce Springsteen**
- "Wonderwall" – Ryan Adams
- "The Revolution Starts Now" – Steve Earle
- "Breathe" – Melissa Etheridge
- "Metropolitan Gride" – Tom Waits

Best Rock Performance by a Duo or Group with Vocal

- **"Vertigo" – U2**
- "Monkey to Man" – Elvis Costello & The Imposters
- "Take Me Out" – Franz Ferdinand
- "American Idiot" – Green Day
- "Somebody Told Me" – The Killers

Best Hard Rock Performance

- **"Slither" – Velvet Revolver**
- "Megalomaniac" – Incubus
- "Some Kind Of Monster" – Metallica
- "Feelin' Way Too Damn Good" – Nickelback
- "Duality" – Slipknot

Best Metal Performance

- **"Whiplash" – Motörhead**
- "Nymphetamine" – Cradle of Filth
- "Live for This" – Hatebreed
- "The End Of Heartache" – Killswitch Engage
- "Vermilion" – Slipknot

Best Rock Instrumental Performance

- **"Mrs. O'Leary's Cow" – Brian Wilson**
- "Instrumental Illness" – The Allman Brothers Band
- "Onda" – Los Lonely Boys
- "O Baterista" – Rush
- "Whispering a Prayer" – Steve Vai

Best Rock Song

- **"Vertigo"**
  - **Bono, Adam Clayton, The Edge & Larry Mullen, songwriters (U2)**
- "American Idiot"
  - Billie Joe Armstrong, Mike Dirnt & Tré Cool, songwriters (Green Day)
- "Fall To Pieces"
  - Duff, Dave Kushner, Slash, Matt Sorum & Scott Weiland, songwriters (Velvet Revolver)
- "Float On"
  - Isaac Brock, Dann Gallucci, Eric Judy & Benjamin Weikel, songwriters (Modest Mouse)
- "Somebody Told Me"
  - Brandon Flowers, Dave Keuning, Mark Stoermer & Ronnie Vannucci, songwriters (The Killers)

Best Rock Album

- **American Idiot – Green Day**
- The Delivery Man – Elvis Costello & The Imposters
- The Reason – Hoobastank
- Hot Fuss – The Killers
- Contraband – Velvet Revolver

=== Alternative ===
Best Alternative Music Album

- **A Ghost Is Born** – Wilco
- Medúlla – Björk
- Franz Ferdinand – Franz Ferdinand
- Uh Huh Her – PJ Harvey
- Good News for People Who Love Bad News– Modest Mouse

=== Blues ===
- Best Contemporary Blues Album
  - Keb' Mo' for Keep It Simple

=== Classical ===
Best Classical Album

- "Adams: On The Transmigration Of Souls" – Lorin Maazel, conductor; John Adams & Lawrence L. Rock, producers

Best Orchestral Performance

- "Adams: On The Transmigration Of Souls" – Lorin Maazel, conductor; John Adams & Lawrence L. Rock, producers

Best Opera Recording

- "Mozart: Le Nozze Di Figaro" – René Jacobs, conductor; Martin Sauer, producer. Angelika Kirchschlager, Lorenzo Regazzo, Patrizia Ciofi, Simon Keenlyside & Véronique Gens, soloists; Reiner Kühl & Sebastian Roth, engineers/mixers

Best Choral Performance

- "Berlioz: Requiem" – Norman Mackenzie, choir director; Robert Spano, conductor; Jack Renner & Michael J. Bishop, engineers/mixers; Elaine L. Martone, producer

Best Instrumental Soloist(s) Performance (with orchestra)

- "Previn: Violin Concerto Anne-Sophie/Bernstein: Serenade" – André Previn, conductor; Anne-Sophie Mutter, soloist

Best Instrumental Soloist Performance (without orchestra)

- "Aire Latino" – David Russell

Best Chamber Music Performance

- "Prokofiev (Arr. Pletnev): Cinderella – Suite For Two Pianos/Ravel: Ma Mère L'Oye" – Martha Argerich & Mikhail Pletnev, soloists

Best Small Ensemble Performance (with or without conductor)

- "Carlos Chávez – Complete Chamber Music, Vol. 2" – Southwest Chamber Music, artist; Jeff Von Der Schmidt, conductor

Best Classical Vocal Performance

- "Ives: Songs (The Things Our Fathers Loved; The Housatonic At Stockbridge, Etc.)" – Susan Graham

Best Classical Contemporary Composition

- "Adams: On The Transmigration Of Souls" – John Adams

Best Classical Crossover Album

- "LAGQ's Guitar Heroes" – Los Angeles Guitar Quartet (John Dearman, William Kanengiser, Scott Tennant, Andrew York)

=== Country ===
Best Female Country Vocal Performance

- "Redneck Woman" – Gretchen Wilson

Best Male Country Vocal Performance

- "Live Like You Were Dying" – Tim McGraw

Best Country Performance by a Duo or Group with Vocal

- "Top of the World" (Live) – Dixie Chicks

Best Country Collaboration with Vocals

- "Portland, Oregon" – Loretta Lynn & Jack White

Best Country Instrumental Performance

- Nitty Gritty Dirt Band (featuring Earl Scruggs, Randy Scruggs, Vassar Clements & Jerry Douglas) for "Earl's Breakdown

Best Country Song

- "Live Like You Were Dying" – Tim McGraw

Best Country Album

- Van Lear Rose – Loretta Lynn

Best Bluegrass Album

- Brand New Strings – Ricky Skaggs & Kentucky Thunder

=== Gospel ===
Best Gospel Performance

- "Heaven Help Us All" – Ray Charles & Gladys Knight

Best Pop/Contemporary Gospel Album

- All Things New – Steven Curtis Chapman

Best Rock Gospel Album

- Wire – Third Day

Best Traditional Soul Gospel Album

- There Will Be a Light – Ben Harper & the Blind Boys of Alabama

Best Contemporary Soul Gospel Album

- Nothing Without You – Smokie Norful

Best Southern, Country or Bluegrass Gospel Album

- Worship & Faith – Randy Travis

Best Gospel Choir or Chorus Album

- Live ... This is Your House – The Brooklyn Tabernacle Choir

=== Jazz ===
Best Jazz Instrumental Solo

- "Speak Like a Child" – Herbie Hancock in Harvey Mason's With All My Heart

Best Jazz Instrumental Album, Individual or Group

- Illuminations – McCoy Tyner with Gary Bartz, Terence Blanchard, Christian McBride and Lewis Nash

Best Large Jazz Ensemble Album

- Concert in the Garden – The Maria Schneider Orchestra

Best Jazz Vocal Album

- R.S.V.P. (Rare Songs, Very Personal) – Nancy Wilson

Best Contemporary Jazz Album

- Unspeakable – Bill Frisell

Best Latin Jazz Album

- Land of the Sun – Charlie Haden

=== Latin ===
Best Latin Pop Album

- **Amar Sin Mentiras – Marc Anthony**
- Sinverguenza – Bacilos
- Pau-Latina – Paulina Rubio
- MTV Unplugged – Diego Torres
- El Rock de Mi Pueblo – Carlos Vives

Best Traditional Tropical Latin Album

- ¡Ahora Si! – Israel "Cachao" López

Best Mexican/Mexican-American Album

- Intimamente – Intocable

Best Latin Rock/Alternative Album

- Street Signs – Ozomatli

Best Tejano Album

- Polkas, Gritos y Accordeones – David Lee Garza, Joel Guzman & Sunny Sauceda

Best Salsa/Merengue Album

- Across 110th Street – The Spanish Harlem Orchestra (featuring Rubén Blades)

=== New Age ===
Best New Age Album

- **Returning – Will Ackerman**
- Atlantis: A Symphonic Journey – David Arkenstone
- Two Horizons – Moya Brennan
- Piano – Peter Kater
- American River – Jonathan Elias

=== Polka ===
Best Polka Album

- Let's Kiss: 25th Anniversary Album – Brave Combo

=== R&B ===
Best Female R&B Vocal Performance

- **"If I Ain't Got You" – Alicia Keys**
- "I Want You" – Janet Jackson
- "I'm Still in Love" – Teena Marie
- "Whatever" – Jill Scott
- "U-Haul" – Angie Stone

Best Male R&B Vocal Performance

- **"Call My Name" – Prince**
- "Charlene" – Anthony Hamilton
- "Happy People" – R. Kelly
- "What We Do Here" – Brian McKnight
- "Burn – Usher

Best R&B Performance by a Duo or Group with Vocals

- **"My Boo" – Usher & Alicia Keys**
    - Destiny's Child for "Lose My Breath"
    - Floetry for "Say Yes"
    - Alicia Keys featuring Tony! Toni! Toné! for "Diary"
    - Earth, Wind & Fire & Raphael Saadiq for "Show Me the Way"

Best Traditional R&B Vocal Performance

- "Musicology" – Prince

Best Urban/Alternative Performance

- "Cross My Mind" – Jill Scott

Best R&B Song

- "You Don't Know My Name" – Alicia Keys

Best R&B Album

- The Diary of Alicia Keys – Alicia Keys

Best Contemporary R&B Album

- Confessions – Usher

=== Rap ===
Best Rap Solo Performance

- **"99 Problems" – Jay-Z**
- "On Fire" – Lloyd Banks
- "Just Lose It" – Eminem
- "Overnight Celebrity" – Twista
- "Through the Wire" – Kanye West

Best Rap Performance by a Duo or Group

- **"Let's Get It Started" – The Black Eyed Peas**
- "Ch-Check It Out" – Beastie Boys
- "Don't Say Nuthing'" – The Roots
- "Drop It Like It's Hot" – Snoop Dogg & Pharrell
- "Lean Back" – Terror Squad

Best Rap/Sung Collaboration

- **"Yeah!" – Usher featuring Lil Jon & Ludacris**
- "Why" – Jadakiss featuring Anthony Hamilton
- "Dip It Low" – Christina Milian featuring Fabolous
- "Slow Jamz" – Twista featuring Kanye West & Jamie Foxx
- "All Falls Down" – Kanye West featuring Syleena Johnson

Best Rap Song

- **"Jesus Walks"**
  - **Miri Ben-Ari, C. Smith & Kanye West, songwriters (Kanye West)**
- "Drop It Like It's Hot"
  - Calvin Broadus, Chad Hugo, S. Thomas & Pharrell Williams, songwriters (Snoop Dogg & Pharrell)
- "Hey Mama"
  - Will Adams & Anthony Henry, songwriters (The Black Eyed Peas)
- "Let's Get It Started"
  - Will Adams, Mike Fratantuno, Jaime Gomez, George Pajon, Jr., Allan Pineda & Terence Yoshiaki, songwriters (The Black Eyed Peas)
- "99 Problems"
  - Shawn Carter & Rick Rubin, songwriters (Jay-Z)

Best Rap Album

- **The College Dropout** – Kanye West
- To the 5 Boroughs – Beastie Boys
- The Black Album – Jay-Z
- The Definition – LL Cool J
- Suit – Nelly

=== Reggae ===
Best Reggae Album

- **True Love – Toots & the Maytals**
- Black Magic – Jimmy Cliff
- The Dub Revolutionaries – Sly and Robbie
- African Holocaust – Steel Pulse
- Def Jamaica – Various Artists

=== World ===
Best Traditional World Music Album

- Raise Your Spirit Higher – Ladysmith Black Mambazo

Best Contemporary World Music Album

- Egypt – Youssou Ndour

=== Spoken ===
Best Spoken Word Album

- My Life – Bill Clinton

=== Visual media ===
Best Compilation Soundtrack Album for a Motion Picture, Television or Other Visual Media

- **"Garden State" – Zach Braff**
- "Cold Mountain" – T Bone Burnett
- "De-Lovely" – Peter Asher, Stephen Endelman
- "Kill Bill Vol. 2" – Quentin Tarantino
- "Shrek 2" – Andrew Adamson, Chris Douridas, Michael Ostin

Best Score Soundtrack Album for a Motion Picture, Television or Other Visual Media

- **"The Lord of the Rings: The Return of the King" – Howard Shore, John Kurlander**
- "Angels in America" – Thomas Newman
- "Big Fish" – Danny Elfman
- "Eternal Sunshine of the Spotless Mind" – Jon Brion
- "Harry Potter and the Prisoner of Azkaban" – John Williams

Best Song Written for a Motion Picture, Television or Other Visual Media

- **"Into the West" (from The Lord of the Rings: The Return of the King) – Annie Lennox, Howard Shore, Fran Walsh**
- "The Scarlet Tide" (from Cold Mountain) – T Bone Burnett, Elvis Costello
- "You Will Be My Ain True Love" (from Cold Mountain) – Sting
- "Accidentally in Love" (from Shrek 2) – Adam Duritz, David Immerglück, Matt Malley, Dan Vickrey
- "Belleville Rendez-vous" (from The Triplets of Belleville) - Benoît Charest, Sylvain Chomet

=== Music video ===
Best Short Form Music Video

- "Vertigo" – Alex and Martin (video directors) & U2

Best Long Form Music Video

- Concert for George – Ray Cooper, Olivia Harrison, Jon Kamen (video producers), David Leland (video director) & Various Artists

=== Packaging and notes ===
Best Recording Package

- A Ghost Is Born
- Peter Buchanan-Smith & Dan Nadel (art directors) (Wilco)

Best Boxed or Special Limited Edition Package

- Stefan Sagmeister (art director) for Once in a Lifetime performed by Talking Heads

Best Album Notes

- Loren Schoenberg (notes writer) for "The Complete Columbia Recordings of Woody Herman and His Orchestra & Woodchoppers (1945–1947)"

=== Production and engineering ===
Best Engineered Album, Non-Classical

- Robert Fernandez, John Harris, Terry Howard, Pete Karam, Joel Moss, Seth Presant, Al Schmitt & Ed Thacker (engineers) for Genius Loves Company, performed by Ray Charles & Various Artists

Best Engineered Album, Classical

- Jack Renner (engineer) for Higdon: City Scape; Concerto for Orchestra, performed by Robert Spano

Best Remixed Recording, Non-Classical

- Jacques Lu Cont (remixer) for "It's My Life (Jacques Lu Cont's Thin White Duke Mix)", performed by No Doubt

Producer of the Year, Non-Classical

- John Shanks

Producer of the Year, Classical

- David Frost

=== Surround sound ===
Best Surround Sound Album

- Al Schmitt (surround mix engineer), Robert Hadley & Doug Sax (surround mastering) for Genius Loves Company performed by Ray Charles & Various Artists

== Special merit awards ==
=== Grammy Hall of Fame Award ===
- "Alexander's Ragtime Band" (Victor, 1911) performed by Arthur Collins & Byron Harlan
- "All of Me" (Columbia, 1932) performed by Louis Armstrong & His Orchestra
- "America the Beautiful" (ABC/TRC, 1972) performed by Ray Charles
- "Brother, Can You Spare a Dime?" (Brunswick, 1932) performed by Bing Crosby
- "Bye Bye Blackbird" (Victor, 1926) performed by Gene Austin
- "California, Here I Come" (Brunswick, 1924) performed by Al Jolson with the Isham Jones Orchestra
- "Embraceable You" (Commodore, 1944) performed by Billie Holiday
- "Lester Leaps In" (Vocalion, 1939) performed by Count Basie's Kansas City 7
- "Let It Bleed" (London, 1969) performed by The Rolling Stones
- "Love Me or Leave Me" (Columbia, 1928) performed by Ruth Etting
- "Lullaby of Broadway" (Brunswick, 1935) performed by Dick Powell
- Meet Me In St. Louis (soundtrack) (Decca, 1944) performed by Judy Garland
- "No Woman No Cry" (Island, 1974) performed by Bob Marley
- "One For My Baby" (Capitol, 1958) performed by Frank Sinatra
- "Peter Gunn" (RCA, 1959) performed by Henry Mancini
- "Puttin' on the Ritz" (Brunswick, 1930) performed by Harry Richman with Earl Burtnett & His Los Angeles Biltmore Hotel Orchestra
- "Thanks for the Memory" (Decca, 1938) performed by Bob Hope & Shirley Ross
- "They Can't Take That Away From Me" (Brunswick, 1937) performed by Fred Astaire with Johnny Green & His Orchestra
- "Vaya Con Dios (May God Be With You)" (Capitol, 1953) performed by Les Paul & Mary Ford
- "The Very Thought of You" (Victor, 1934) performed by Ray Noble & His Orchestra

=== Grammy Lifetime Achievement Award ===
- Eddy Arnold
- Art Blakey
- The Carter Family
- Morton Gould
- Janis Joplin
- Led Zeppelin
- Jerry Lee Lewis
- Jelly Roll Morton
- Pinetop Perkins,
- The Staple Singers

=== MusiCares Person of the Year ===
- Brian Wilson

=== Grammy Trustees Award ===
- Hoagy Carmichael
- Don Cornelius
- Alfred Lion
- Billy Taylor

== In Memoriam ==
Estelle Axton, Danny Sugarman, Bruce Palmer, Johnny Ramone, Darrell "Dimebag" Abbott, Jim Capaldi, Artie Shaw, Barney Kessel, Elvin Jones, Illinois Jacquet, Michel Colombier, Alvino Rey, Ol' Dirty Bastard, Jan Berry, Terry Melcher, Laura Branigan, Cornelius Bumpus, Spencer Dryden, Elmer Bernstein, David Raksin, Jerry Goldsmith, Vaughn Meader, Rodney Dangerfield, Scott Muni, Johnny Carson, Skeeter Davis, Bill Lowery, Hank Garland, Arnold "Gatemouth" Moore, Ernie Ball, Tom Capone, Isidro Lopez, Robert Merrill, Renata Tebaldi, Fred Ebb, Cy Coleman, Paul Atkinson, Artie Mogull, Carole Fields Arnold, Rick James, Freddie Perren, Syreeta Wright and Ray Charles.

== Trivia ==
- Ray Charles five Grammy wins is the record for most posthumous Grammy Awards won in one night. He is the first artist to win a posthumous Album of the Year Grammy since John Lennon in 1982.
- Upon winning Album of the Year as one of the engineers for Ray Charles' Genius Loves Company, Al Schmitt became the first and only person to have won both the Grammy for Album of the Year and the Latin Grammy for Album of the Year. In 2000 he won the Latin Grammy for Album of the Year for engineering Luis Miguel's Amarte Es Un Placer.
