= List of awards and nominations received by Anthony Minghella =

List of Anthony Minghella awards
Award	Wins	Nominations
Academy Award	1	4
BAFTA Awards	3	9
Golden Globe Awards	0	5
Olivier Award	1	1

The following is a list of awards and nominations received by American filmmaker Anthony Minghella, chronicling his achievements in the film industry. Minghella is the winner of multiple awards including an Academy Award, two BAFTA Awards, and a Laurence Olivier Award.

He's known for writing and directing such films as Truly, Madly, Deeply (1991), The English Patient (1996), The Talented Mr. Ripley (1999), and Cold Mountain (2003). He also executive produced Iris (2001), The Quiet American (2002), Michael Clayton (2007), and The Reader (2008).

== Major associations ==
Academy Awards

Year	Category	Nominated work	Result	Ref.
1997	Best Director	The English Patient	Won	
1997	Best Adapted Screenplay	The English Patient	Nominated	
2000	Best Adapted Screenplay	The Talented Mr. Ripley	Nominated	
2009	Best Picture	The Reader	Nominated	

BAFTA Awards

Year	Category	Nominated work	Result	Ref.
1991	Best Original Screenplay	Truly, Madly, Deeply	Won	
1996	Best Film	The English Patient	Won	
1996	Best Direction	The English Patient	Nominated	
1996	Best Adapted Screenplay	The English Patient	Won	
1999	Best Direction	The Talented Mr. Ripley	Nominated	
1999	Best Adapted Screenplay	The Talented Mr. Ripley	Nominated	
2003	Outstanding British Film	Cold Mountain	Nominated	
2003	Best Direction	Cold Mountain	Nominated	
2003	Best Adapted Screenplay	Cold Mountain	Nominated	

Golden Globe Awards

Year	Category	Nominated work	Result	Ref.
1997	Best Director	The English Patient	Nominated	
1997	Best Screenplay	The English Patient	Nominated	
2000	Best Director	The Talented Mr. Ripley	Nominated	
2004	Best Director	Cold Mountain	Nominated	
2004	Best Screenplay	Cold Mountain	Nominated	

Laurence Olivier Award

Year	Category	Nominated work	Result
2006	Best New Opera Production	Madame Butterfly	Won

== Miscellaneous awards ==
Year	Award	Category	Nominated work	Result
1984	Plays and Players Awards	Most Promising Playwright	A Little Like Drowning	Won
1986	Plays and Players Awards	Best New Play	Made in Bangkok	Won
1988	Giles Cooper Award		Cigarettes and Chocolate	Won
1996	Critics' Choice Movie Awards	Best Director	The English Patient	Won
1996	Critics' Choice Movie Awards	Best Adapted Screenplay	The English Patient	Won
1996	Directors Guild of America Award	Outstanding Achievement in Motion Pictures	The English Patient	Won
1996	Satellite Awards	Best Adapted Screenplay	The English Patient	Won
1999	National Board of Review	Best Director	The Talented Mr. Ripley	Won
2003	National Board of Review	Best Adapted Screenplay	Cold Mountain	Won

== Directed Academy Award performances ==
Minghella was directed multiple Oscar winning and nominated performances.

Year	Performer	Film	Result
Academy Award for Best Actor
1997	Ralph Fiennes	The English Patient	Nominated
2004	Jude Law	Cold Mountain	Nominated
Academy Award for Best Actress
1997	Kristin Scott Thomas	The English Patient	Nominated
Academy Award for Best Supporting Actor
2000	Jude Law	The Talented Mr. Ripley	Nominated
Academy Award for Best Supporting Actress
1997	Juliette Binoche	The English Patient	Won
2004	Renée Zellweger	Cold Mountain	Won
