= 76th Academy Awards =

- Official poster by Burton Morris
- Date: February 29, 2004
- Site: Kodak Theatre; Hollywood, Los Angeles, California, U.S.
- Hosted by: Billy Crystal
- Preshow hosts: Billy Bush; Chris Connelly; Maria Menounos
- Produced by: Joe Roth
- Directed by: Louis J. Horvitz

Highlights
- Best Picture: The Lord of the Rings: The Return of the King
- Most awards: The Lord of the Rings: The Return of the King (11)
- Most nominations: The Lord of the Rings: The Return of the King (11)

TV in the United States
- Network: ABC
- Duration: 3 hours, 45 minutes
- Ratings: 43.56 million 26.68% (Nielsen ratings)

The 76th Academy Awards ceremony, presented by the Academy of Motion Picture Arts and Sciences (AMPAS), honored the best films of 2003 and took place on February 29, 2004, at the Kodak Theatre in Hollywood, Los Angeles. During the ceremony, AMPAS presented Academy Awards (commonly referred to as Oscars) in 24 categories. The ceremony, televised in the United States by ABC, was produced by Joe Roth and was directed by Louis J. Horvitz. Actor Billy Crystal hosted for the eighth time. He first presided over the 62nd ceremony held in 1990 and had last hosted the 72nd ceremony held in 2000. Two weeks earlier in a ceremony at The Ritz-Carlton Huntington Hotel & Spa in Pasadena, California held on February 14, the Academy Awards for Technical Achievement were presented by host Jennifer Garner.

The Lord of the Rings: The Return of the King won a record-tying eleven awards including Best Director for Peter Jackson and Best Picture. Other winners included Master and Commander: The Far Side of the World and Mystic River with two awards and The Barbarian Invasions, Chernobyl Heart, Cold Mountain, Finding Nemo, The Fog of War: Eleven Lessons from the Life of Robert S. McNamara, Harvie Krumpet, Lost in Translation, Monster, and Two Soldiers with one. The telecast garnered nearly 44 million viewers in the United States, making it the most-watched telecast in four years.

== Winners and nominees ==
The nominees for the 76th Academy Awards were announced on January 27, 2004, at the Samuel Goldwyn Theater in Beverly Hills, California, by Frank Pierson, president of the Academy, and the actress Sigourney Weaver. The Lord of the Rings: The Return of the King received the most nominations with eleven; Master and Commander: The Far Side of the World came in second with ten.

The winners were announced during the awards ceremony on February 29, 2004. With eleven awards, The Lord of the Rings: The Return of the King is tied with Ben-Hur and Titanic as the most awarded films in Oscar history. Moreover, its clean sweep of its eleven nominations surpassed Gigi and The Last Emperor's nine awards for the largest sweep for a single film in Oscar history. The film was also the tenth film to win Best Picture without any acting nominations. Best Director nominee Sofia Coppola became the first American woman and third woman overall to be nominated in that category. By virtue of her father, Francis Ford Coppola and her grandfather, Carmine's previous wins, her victory in the Original Screenplay category made her the second third-generation Oscar winner in history. With Sean Penn and Tim Robbins's respective wins in the Best Actor and Best Supporting Actor categories, Mystic River became the fourth film to win both male acting awards.

=== Awards ===
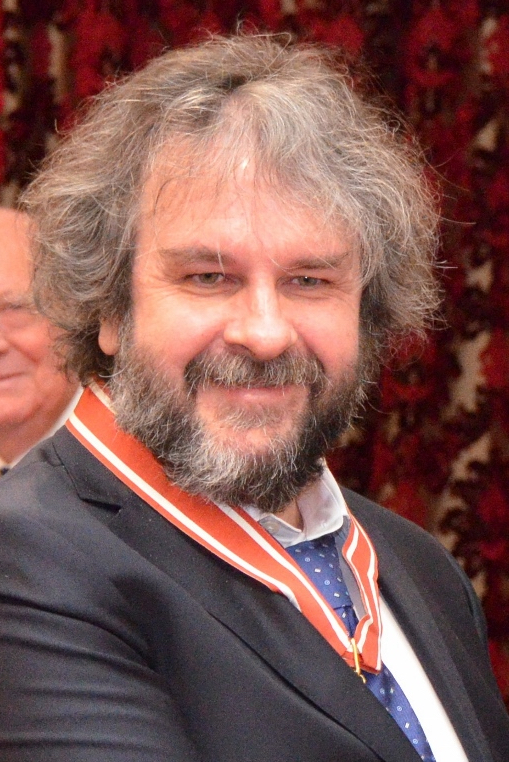
Peter Jackson, Best Picture and Best Adapted Screenplay co-winner and Best Director winner

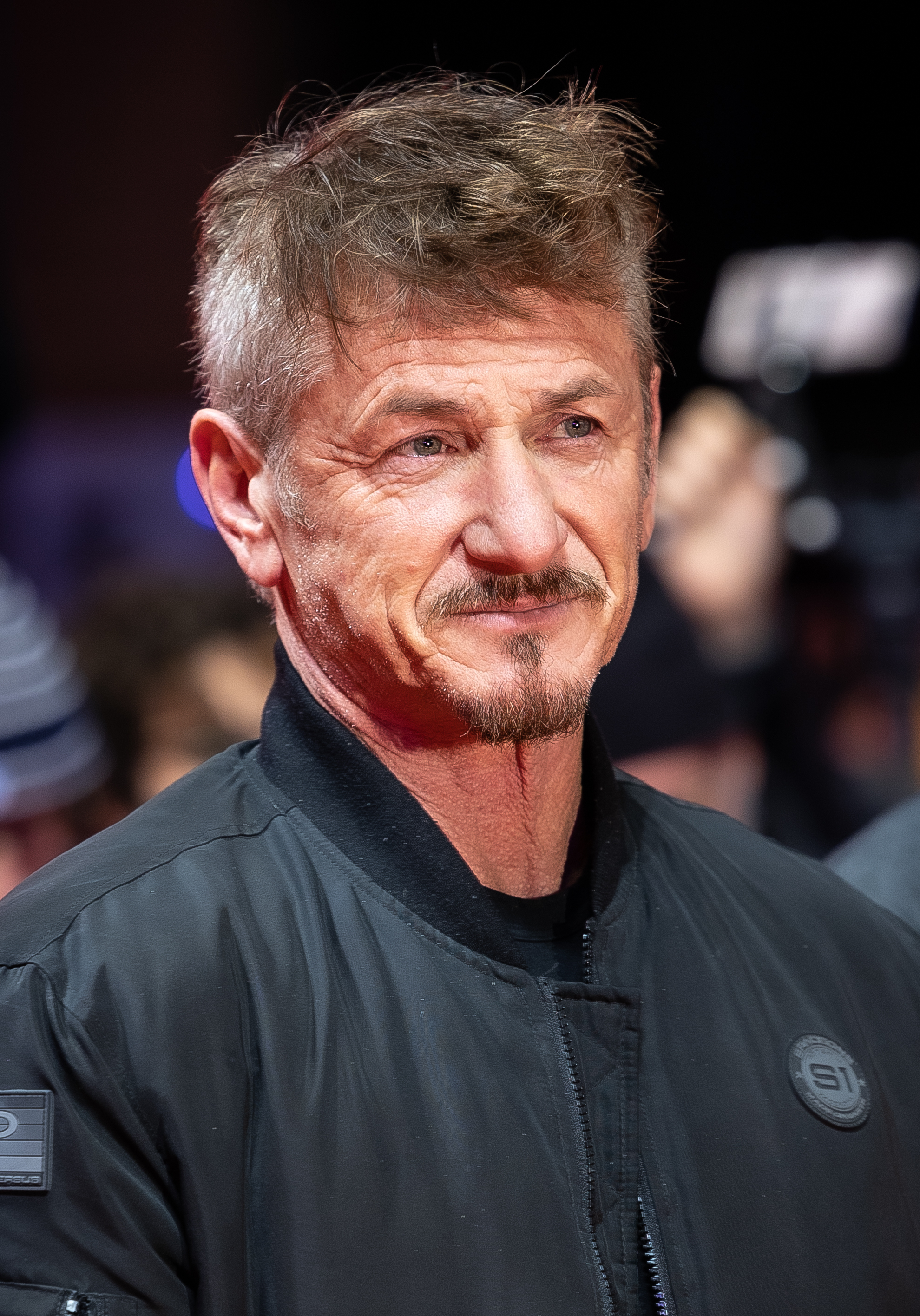
Sean Penn, Best Actor winner

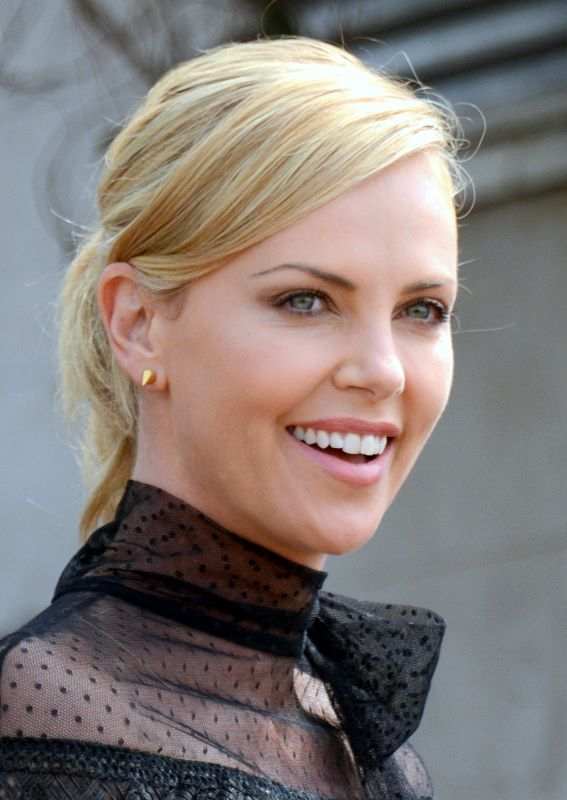
Charlize Theron, Best Actress winner

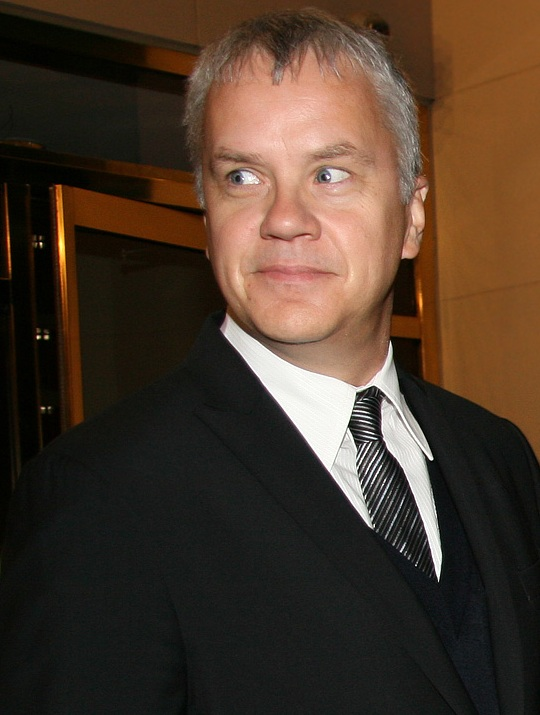
Tim Robbins, Best Supporting Actor winner

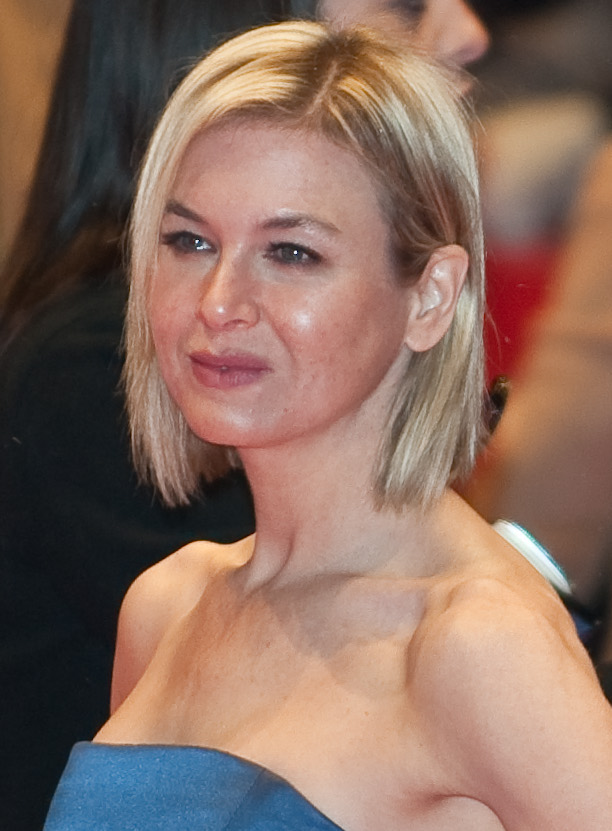
Renée Zellweger, Best Supporting Actress winner

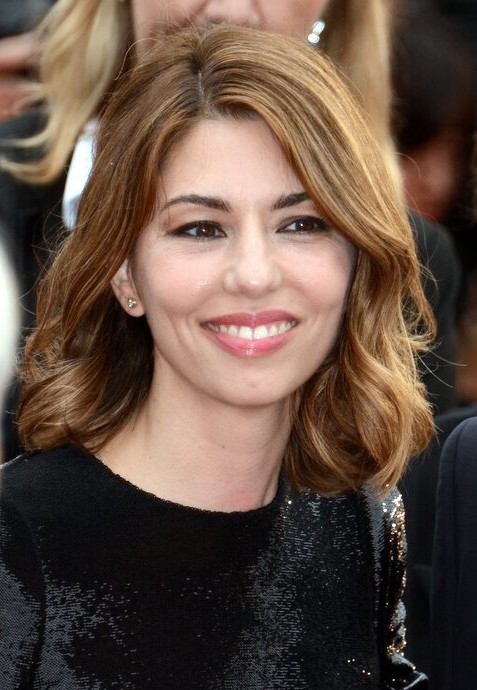
Sofia Coppola, Best Original Screenplay winner

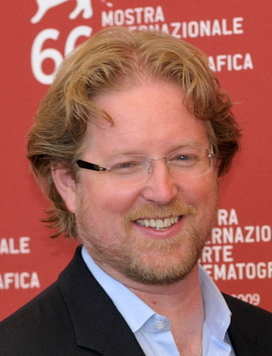
Andrew Stanton, Best Animated Feature Film winner

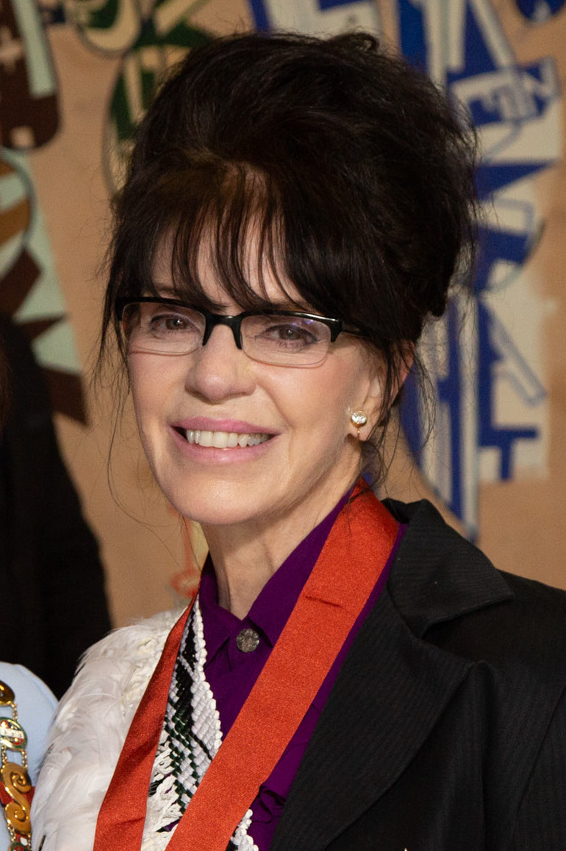
Fran Walsh, Best Picture, Best Adapted Screenplay, and Best Original Song co-winner

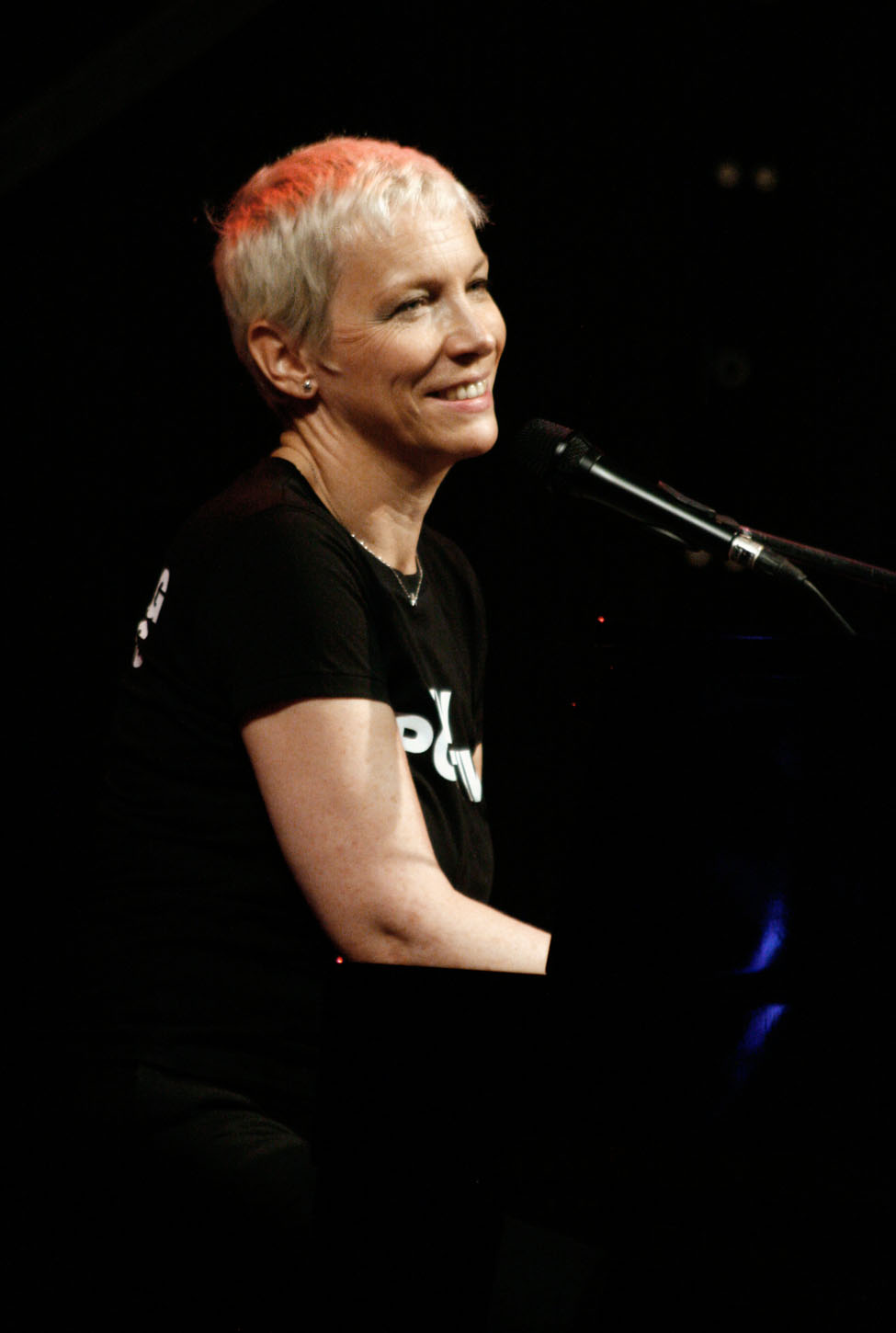
Annie Lennox, Best Song winner

Winners are listed first, highlighted in boldface, and indicated with a double dagger (‡).

**Best Picture**: **The Lord of the Rings: The Return of the King – Barrie M. Osborne, Peter Jackson and Fran Walsh, producers**‡; Lost in Translation – Ross Katz and Sofia Coppola, producers; Master and Commander: The Far Side of the World – Samuel Goldwyn Jr., Peter Weir and Duncan Henderson, producers; Mystic River – Robert Lorenz, Judie G. Hoyt and Clint Eastwood, producers; Seabiscuit – Kathleen Kennedy, Frank Marshall and Gary Ross, producers	**Best Directing**: **Peter Jackson – The Lord of the Rings: The Return of the King**‡; Fernando Meirelles – City of God; Sofia Coppola – Lost in Translation; Peter Weir – Master and Commander: The Far Side of the World; Clint Eastwood – Mystic River
**Best Actor in a Leading Role**: **Sean Penn – Mystic River as Jimmy Markum**‡; Johnny Depp – Pirates of the Caribbean: The Curse of the Black Pearl as Captain Jack Sparrow; Ben Kingsley – House of Sand and Fog as Massoud Amir Behrani; Jude Law – Cold Mountain as W. P. Inman; Bill Murray – Lost in Translation as Bob Harris	**Best Actress in a Leading Role**: **Charlize Theron – Monster as Aileen Wuornos**‡; Keisha Castle-Hughes – Whale Rider as Paikea Apirana; Diane Keaton – Something's Gotta Give as Erica Barry; Samantha Morton – In America as Sarah Sullivan; Naomi Watts – 21 Grams as Cristina "Cris" Williams-Peck
**Best Actor in a Supporting Role**: **Tim Robbins – Mystic River as Dave Boyle**‡; Alec Baldwin – The Cooler as Shelley Kaplow; Benicio del Toro – 21 Grams as Jack Jordan; Djimon Hounsou – In America as Mateo Kuamey; Ken Watanabe – The Last Samurai as Lord Moritsugu Katsumoto	**Best Actress in a Supporting Role**: **Renée Zellweger – Cold Mountain as Ruby Thewes**‡; Shohreh Aghdashloo – House of Sand and Fog as Nadereh Behrani; Patricia Clarkson – Pieces of April as Joy Burns; Marcia Gay Harden – Mystic River as Celeste Boyle; Holly Hunter – Thirteen as Melanie Freeland
**Best Writing (Original Screenplay)**: **Lost in Translation – Sofia Coppola**‡; The Barbarian Invasions – Denys Arcand; Dirty Pretty Things – Steven Knight; Finding Nemo – Screenplay by Andrew Stanton, Bob Peterson and David Reynolds; Original Story by Andrew Stanton; In America – Jim Sheridan, Naomi Sheridan and Kirsten Sheridan	**Best Writing (Adapted Screenplay)**: **The Lord of the Rings: The Return of the King – Fran Walsh, Philippa Boyens and Peter Jackson based on the book by J. R. R. Tolkien**‡; American Splendor – Shari Springer Berman and Robert Pulcini based on the comic book series American Splendor by Harvey Pekar and Our Cancer Year by Harvey Pekar and Joyce Brabner; City of God – Bráulio Mantovani based on the novel Cidade de Deus by Paulo Lins; Mystic River – Brian Helgeland based on the novel by Dennis Lehane; Seabiscuit – Gary Ross based on the book by Laura Hillenbrand
**Best Animated Feature Film**: **Finding Nemo – Andrew Stanton**‡; Brother Bear – Aaron Blaise and Robert Walker; The Triplets of Belleville – Sylvain Chomet	**Best Foreign Language Film**: **The Barbarian Invasions (Canada) in French – Denys Arcand**‡; Evil (Sweden) in Swedish – Mikael Håfström; The Twilight Samurai (Japan) in Japanese – Yoji Yamada; Twin Sisters (Netherlands) in Dutch – Ben Sombogaart; Želary (Czech Republic) in Czech – Ondřej Trojan
**Best Documentary (Feature)**: **The Fog of War – Errol Morris and Michael Williams**‡; Balseros – Carles Bosch and Josep Maria Domènech; Capturing the Friedmans – Andrew Jarecki and Marc Smerling; My Architect – Nathaniel Kahn and Susan Rose Behr; The Weather Underground – Sam Green and Bill Siegel	**Best Documentary (Short Subject)**: **Chernobyl Heart – Maryann DeLeo**‡; Asylum – Sandy McLeod and Gini Reticker; Ferry Tales – Katja Esson
**Best Short Film (Live Action)**: **Two Soldiers – Aaron Schneider and Andrew J. Sacks**‡; Die Rote Jacke (The Red Jacket) – Florian Baxmeyer; Most (The Bridge) – Bobby Garabedian and William Zabka; Squash – Lionel Bailliu; (A) Torzija [(A) Torsion] – Stefan Arsenijević	**Best Short Film (Animated)**: **Harvie Krumpet – Adam Elliot**‡; Boundin' – Bud Luckey; Destino – Dominique Monféry and Roy Edward Disney; Gone Nutty – Carlos Saldanha and John C. Donkin; Nibbles – Christopher Hinton
**Best Music (Original Score)**: **The Lord of the Rings: The Return of the King – Howard Shore**‡; Big Fish – Danny Elfman; Cold Mountain – Gabriel Yared; Finding Nemo – Thomas Newman; House of Sand and Fog – James Horner	**Best Music (Original Song)**: **"Into the West" from The Lord of the Rings: The Return of the King – Music and Lyrics by Fran Walsh, Howard Shore and Annie Lennox**‡; "Belleville Rendez-vous" from The Triplets of Belleville – Music by Benoît Charest; Lyrics by Sylvain Chomet; "A Kiss at the End of the Rainbow" from A Mighty Wind – Music and Lyrics by Michael McKean and Annette O'Toole; "Scarlet Tide" from Cold Mountain – Music and Lyrics by T Bone Burnett and Elvis Costello; "You Will Be My Ain True Love" from Cold Mountain – Music and Lyrics by Sting
**Best Sound Editing**: **Master and Commander: The Far Side of the World – Richard King**‡; Finding Nemo – Gary Rydstrom and Michael Silvers; Pirates of the Caribbean: The Curse of the Black Pearl – Christopher Boyes and George Watters II	**Best Sound Mixing**: **The Lord of the Rings: The Return of the King – Christopher Boyes, Michael Semanick, Michael Hedges and Hammond Peek**‡; The Last Samurai – Andy Nelson, Anna Behlmer and Jeff Wexler; Master and Commander: The Far Side of the World – Paul Massey, Doug Hemphill and Art Rochester; Pirates of the Caribbean: The Curse of the Black Pearl – Christopher Boyes, David Parker, David Campbell and Lee Orloff; Seabiscuit – Andy Nelson, Anna Behlmer and Tod A. Maitland
**Best Art Direction**: **The Lord of the Rings: The Return of the King – Art Direction: Grant Major; Set Decoration: Dan Hennah and Alan Lee**‡; Girl with a Pearl Earring – Art Direction: Ben Van Os; Set Decoration: Cecile Heideman; The Last Samurai – Art Direction: Lilly Kilvert; Set Decoration: Gretchen Rau; Master and Commander: The Far Side of the World – Art Direction: William Sandell; Set Decoration: Robert Gould; Seabiscuit – Art Direction: Jeannine Oppewall; Set Decoration: Leslie Pope	**Best Cinematography**: **Master and Commander: The Far Side of the World – Russell Boyd**‡; City of God – Cesar Charlone; Cold Mountain – John Seale; Girl with a Pearl Earring – Eduardo Serra; Seabiscuit – John Schwartzman
**Best Makeup**: **The Lord of the Rings: The Return of the King – Richard Taylor and Peter King**‡; Master and Commander: The Far Side of the World – Edouard Henriques III and Yolanda Toussieng; Pirates of the Caribbean: The Curse of the Black Pearl – Ve Neill and Martin Samuel	**Best Costume Design**: **The Lord of the Rings: The Return of the King – Ngila Dickson and Richard Taylor**‡; Girl with a Pearl Earring – Dien van Straalen; The Last Samurai – Ngila Dickson; Master and Commander: The Far Side of the World – Wendy Stites; Seabiscuit – Judianna Makovsky
**Best Film Editing**: **The Lord of the Rings: The Return of the King – Jamie Selkirk**‡; City of God – Daniel Rezende; Cold Mountain – Walter Murch; Master and Commander: The Far Side of the World – Lee Smith; Seabiscuit – William Goldenberg	**Best Visual Effects**: **The Lord of the Rings: The Return of the King – Jim Rygiel, Joe Letteri, Randall William Cook and Alex Funke**‡; Master and Commander: The Far Side of the World – Dan Sudick, Stefen Fangmeier, Nathan McGuinness and Robert Stromberg; Pirates of the Caribbean: The Curse of the Black Pearl – John Knoll, Hal Hickel, Charles Gibson and Terry Frazee

=== Honorary Award ===
- To Blake Edwards in recognition of his writing, directing and producing an extraordinary body of work for the screen.

=== Films with multiple nominations and awards ===
Films with multiple nominations
Nominations	Film
11	The Lord of the Rings: The Return of the King
10	Master and Commander: The Far Side of the World
7	Cold Mountain
7	Seabiscuit
6	Mystic River
5	Pirates of the Caribbean: The Curse of the Black Pearl
4	City of God
4	Finding Nemo
4	The Last Samurai
4	Lost in Translation
3	In America
3	Girl with a Pearl Earring
3	House of Sand and Fog
2	The Barbarian Invasions
2	The Triplets of Belleville
2	21 Grams

Films with multiple awards
Awards	Film
11	The Lord of the Rings: The Return of the King
2	Master and Commander: The Far Side of the World
2	Mystic River

== Presenters and performers ==
The following individuals presented awards or performed individual numbers.

=== Presenters (in order of appearance) ===
Name(s)	Role
Andy Geller	Announcer for the 76th annual Academy Awards
Sean Connery	Presenter of the opening montage
Catherine Zeta-Jones	Presenter of the award for Best Supporting Actor
Ian McKellen	Presenter of the film The Lord of the Rings: The Return of the King on the Best Picture segment
Angelina Jolie	Presenter of the award for Best Art Direction
Robin Williams	Presenter of the award for Best Animated Feature Film
Renée Zellweger	Presenter of the award for Best Costume Design
Nicolas Cage	Presenter of the film Master and Commander: The Far Side of the World on the Best Picture segment
Chris Cooper	Presenter of the award for Best Supporting Actress
Tom Hanks	Presenter of the tribute to Bob Hope
Ben Stiller; Owen Wilson	Presenters of the awards for Best Live Action Short Film and Best Animated Short Film
Liv Tyler	Introducer of the performances of Best Original Song nominees "You Will Be My Ain True Love", "The Scarlet Tide" and "Into the West"
Jada Pinkett Smith; Will Smith	Presenters of the award for Best Visual Effects
Jennifer Garner	Presenter of the segment of the Academy Awards for Technical Achievement and the Gordon E. Sawyer Award
Jim Carrey	Presenter of the Honorary Academy Award to Blake Edwards
Bill Murray	Presenter of the film Lost in Translation on the Best Picture segment
Scarlett Johansson	Presenter of the award for Best Makeup
Sandra Bullock; John Travolta	Presenters of the awards for Best Sound Mixing and Best Sound Editing
Julia Roberts	Presenter of the tribute to Katharine Hepburn
Oprah Winfrey	Presenter of the film Mystic River on the Best Picture segment
John Cusack; Diane Lane	Presenters of the award for Best Documentary Short
Alec Baldwin; Naomi Watts	Presenters of the award for Best Documentary Feature
Frank Pierson (AMPAS President)	Presenter of the "In Memoriam" tribute
Phil Collins; Sting	Presenters of the award for Best Original Score
Pierce Brosnan; Julianne Moore	Presenters of the award for Best Film Editing
Jamie Lee Curtis	Introducer of the performances of Best Original Song nominees "A Kiss at the End of the Rainbow" and "Belleville Rendez-vous"
Jack Black; Will Ferrell	Presenters of the award for Best Original Song
Charlize Theron	Presenter of the award for Best Foreign Language Film
Jude Law; Uma Thurman	Presenters of the award for Best Cinematography
Francis Ford Coppola; Sofia Coppola	Presenters of the award for Best Adapted Screenplay
Tobey Maguire	Presenter of the film Seabiscuit on the Best Picture segment
Tim Robbins; Susan Sarandon	Presenters of the award for Best Original Screenplay
Tom Cruise	Presenter of the award for Best Director
Adrien Brody	Presenter of the award for Best Actress
Nicole Kidman	Presenter of the award for Best Actor
Steven Spielberg	Presenter of the award for Best Picture

=== Performers (in order of appearance) ===
Name(s)	Role	Performed
Marc Shaiman; Harold Wheeler	Musical arrangers	Orchestral
Billy Crystal	Performer	Opening number: Mystic River (to the tune of "Ol' Man River" from Show Boat), Lost in Translation (to the tune of "Maria" from West Side Story), The Lord of the Rings: The Return of the King (to the tune of "My Favorite Things" from The Sound of Music), Seabiscuit (to the tune of "Goldfinger" from Goldfinger) and Master and Commander: The Far Side of the World (to the tune of "Come Fly with Me" by Frank Sinatra)
Alison Krauss; Sting	Performers	"You Will Be My Ain True Love" from Cold Mountain
Elvis Costello; Alison Krauss	Performers	"The Scarlet Tide" from Cold Mountain
Annie Lennox	Performer	"Into the West" from The Lord of the Rings: The Return of the King
Eugene Levy; Catherine O'Hara (Note: Eugene Levy and Catherine O'Hara performed the song as their film characters Mitch Cohen and Mickey Crabbe (to which they were credited as performers on the telecast).)	Performers	"Kiss at the End of the Rainbow" from A Mighty Wind
Béatrice Bonifassi; Benoît Charest	Performers	"Belleville Rendez-vous" from The Triplets of Belleville
Jack Black; Will Ferrell	Performers	"Get Off the Stage" song parody during the Best Original Song presentation

== Ceremony information ==
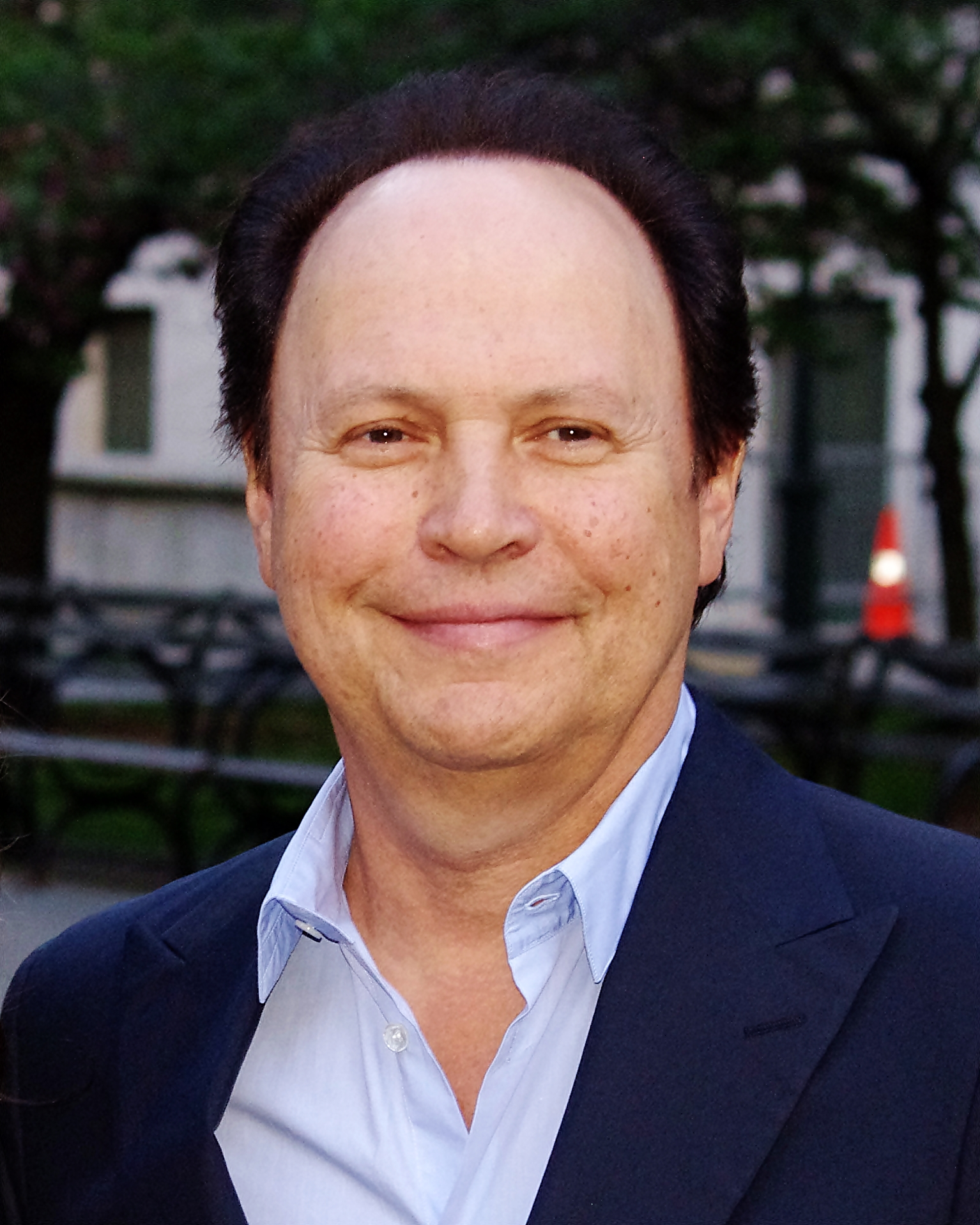
Billy Crystal hosted the 76th Academy Awards.

In August 2002, AMPAS announced that starting with the 76th ceremony, the festivities would be held in late February as opposed to previous years where it was held in March or April. AMPAS director of communications John Pavlik explaining the purpose to "to bolster the ceremony's sagging television ratings and protect the Oscar's status as the nation's pre-eminent awards event." Despite several Academy officials denying such reasons, some industry insiders speculated that the earlier Oscar date was also implemented to mitigate the intense campaigning and lobbying during Oscar season put forth by film studios. In March 2003, the 76th ceremony was announced to take place on February 29, 2004. This marked the first time since the 14th ceremony that the awards were held outside the aforementioned time frame.

In August 2003, the Academy hired film producer Joe Roth to oversee production of the ceremony. The following month, Roth recruited veteran Oscar host Billy Crystal to emcee the awards gala for the eighth time. In December 2003, Louis J. Horvitz was announced as a director of a telecast, for the eight time in his career. To stir interest surrounding the awards, Roth produced three trailers promoting the ceremony that each was set to different pop tunes (Madonna's "Hollywood", OutKast's "Hey Ya!", and Pink's "Get the Party Started"). The trailers contained clips of previous ceremonies with slogans such as "Expected the unexpected" and "It's Oscar night" occasionally flashing between scenes. These promotional spots were shown at movie theaters, on several cable channels, and at participating Blockbuster stores. The Academy also granted talk show host Oprah Winfrey unprecedented access to rehearsals and meetings as part of a month-long series on her eponymous talk show covering behind the scenes preparation of the telecast.

=== MPAA ban on screeners ===
In September 2003, the Motion Picture Association of America (MPAA) initially banned distribution of screeners to awards groups, citing fears of piracy. Many independent film studios and prominent film directors objected to this decision charging that this would hurt smaller films for Oscar consideration since they heavily rely on screeners to lure Academy members' attention. The following month, AMPAS and the MPAA reached an agreement in which Academy members would receive the screeners on the condition that they keep them out of reach from people unaffiliated with AMPAS. In December 2003, a federal judge in New York overturned the ban citing that it violated federal antitrust laws.

=== Box office performance of nominated films ===
At the time of the nominations announcement on January 27, the combined gross of the five Best Picture nominees was $638 million with an average of $127 million per film. The Lord of the Rings: The Return of the King was the highest earner among the Best Picture nominees with $338.3 million in domestic box office receipts. The film was followed by Seabiscuit ($120.2 million), Master and Commander: The Far Side of the World ($85.3 million), Mystic River ($59.1 million), and finally Lost in Translation ($34.8 million).

Of the top 50 grossing movies of the year, 45 nominations went to 10 films on the list. Only Finding Nemo (1st), The Lord of the Rings: Return of the King (2nd), Pirates of the Caribbean: The Curse of the Black Pearl (3rd), Seabiscuit (16th), Something's Gotta Give (21st), The Last Samurai (23rd), Master and Commander: The Far Side of the World (31st), Brother Bear (32nd) Cold Mountain (37th), and Mystic River (46th) were nominated for Best Picture, Best Animated Feature, or any of the directing, acting, or screenwriting.

=== Tape delay implementation ===
In light of the controversy surrounding the halftime show during Super Bowl XXXVIII, network ABC implemented a five-second tape delay to ensure that profanity and obscenity were not seen or heard. AMPAS president Frank Pierson protested this decision in a written statement, stating, "Even a very brief tape-delay introduces a form of censorship into the broadcast—not direct governmental control, but it means that a network representative is in effect guessing at what a government might tolerate, which can be even worse." In response, producer Joe Roth reiterated that censorship would only be applied to profanity and not political speeches.

=== Critical reviews ===
The show received a mixed reception from media publications. Chicago Tribune television critic Steve Johnson lamented that the show "felt almost numbingly familiar and disappointingly genteel." He also criticized broadcaster ABC's decision to implement the five-second tape delay. Tom Shales of The Washington Post quipped that the ceremony "was about as entertaining as watching Jell-O congeal." He also added that the lack of surprises among the awards contributed to the dull atmosphere of the telecast. Columnist Tim Goodman of San Francisco Chronicle bemoaned, "The 76th annual Academy Awards dragged on without much drama or comedy, sucking the life out of the event even while it was doing justice to the masterpiece that is The Lord of the Rings."

Other media outlets received the broadcast more positively. Ken Tucker of Entertainment Weekly praised Crystal's hosting performance saying that he "has located the perfect middle ground between Steve Martin's adroit silliness and Whoopi Goldberg's unapologetic hamminess." On the show itself, he said that it "managed to do what Hollywood may not have: convince us that this was a great year for the movies." Film critic Andrew Sarris of The New York Observer wrote that the show was "the funniest and least tedious in memory." He also extolled producer Joe Roth by concluding, "As far as this old critic's concerned, Mr. Roth, you did a fine job." USA Today critic Robert Bianco commented that despite the lack of suspense due to the Lord of the Rings sweep of the awards "Crystal was able to lace funny bits throughout the evening." He further lauded the show as "more glamorous and upbeat than last year's war-muted event, and decently paced."

=== Ratings and reception ===
The American telecast on ABC drew in an average of 43.56 million people over its length, which was a 26% increase from the previous year's ceremony. An estimated 73.89 million total viewers watched all or part of the awards. The show also earned higher Nielsen ratings compared to the previous ceremony with 26.68% of households watching over a 41.84 share. In addition, it garnered a higher 18–49 demo rating with a 15.48 rating over a 38.79 share among viewers in that demographic. It was the highest viewership for an Academy Award telecast since the 72nd ceremony held in 2000.

In July 2004, the ceremony presentation received nine nominations at the 56th Primetime Emmys. Two months later, the ceremony won one of those nominations for Louis J. Horvitz's direction of the telecast.

== "In Memoriam" ==
The annual "In Memoriam" tribute was presented by Academy President Frank Pierson. The montage featured an excerpt of "The Love of the Princess" from The Thief of Bagdad, composed by Miklós Rózsa (Ben-Hur, Spellbound, Quo Vadis, King of Kings, El Cid).

- Gregory Peck
- Wendy Hiller
- David Hemmings
- Hope Lange
- George Axelrod – Screenwriter
- Charles Bronson
- Michael Jeter
- David Newman – Screenwriter
- Ron O'Neal
- Art Carney
- Elia Kazan – Director
- Leni Riefenstahl – Documentary Filmmaker
- Karen Morley
- Buddy Ebsen
- John Schlesinger – Director
- Stan Brakhage – Experimental Filmmaker
- Ray Stark – Producer
- Andrew J. Kuehn – Producer, film trailer pioneer
- John Ritter
- Hume Cronyn
- Buddy Hackett
- Michael Kamen – Composer
- John Gregory Dunne – Screenwriter
- Robert Stack
- Alan Bates
- Gregory Hines
- Jack Elam
- Jeanne Crain
- Ann Miller
- Donald O'Connor

A separate tribute to comedian, actor, and veteran Oscar host Bob Hope was presented by Tom Hanks. Later, actress Julia Roberts presented one to actress Katharine Hepburn.

== See also ==
- 10th Screen Actors Guild Awards
- 24th Golden Raspberry Awards
- 46th Grammy Awards
- 56th Primetime Emmy Awards
- 57th British Academy Film Awards
- 58th Tony Awards
- 61st Golden Globe Awards
- List of submissions to the 76th Academy Awards for Best Foreign Language Film

== Bibliography ==
- Austerlitz, Saul (2010), Another Fine Mess: A History of American Film Comedy, Chicago, United States: Chicago Review Press, ISBN 978-1556529511
- Ebert, Roger (2004), Roger Ebert's Movie Yearbook 2005, Kansas City, United States: Andrews McMeel Publishing, ISBN 978-0740747427
- Pond, Steve (2005), The Big Show: High Times and Dirty Dealings Backstage at the Academy Awards, New York, United States: Faber and Faber, ISBN 0-571-21193-3
