= 2003 Academy Awards =

2003 Academy Awards may refer to:

- 75th Academy Awards, the Academy Awards ceremony that took place in 2003, honoring the best in film for 2002
- 76th Academy Awards, the Academy Awards ceremony that took place in 2004, honoring the best in film for 2003
