= Day After Tomorrow (Joan Baez album) =

Studio album by Joan Baez
- Released: September 9, 2008
- Recorded: December 2007 – March 2008
- Studio: Sound Emporium (Nashville, Tennessee); Room & Board Recording (Nashville, Tennessee)
- Genre: Folk
- Label: Proper
- Producer: Steve Earle

Joan Baez chronology
Bowery Songs (2005)	Day After Tomorrow (2008)	Whistle Down the Wind (2018)

Professional ratings
Review scores
Source	Rating
AllMusic	4/5 stars
Rolling Stone	3/5 stars

Day After Tomorrow the twenty-fifth studio album (and twenty-seventh overall) by the American singer and musician Joan Baez, released in 2008. It was her first studio album in 5 years. The album features songs written by such composers as Tom Waits, Elvis Costello, T Bone Burnett, Patty Griffin, Thea Gilmore and Steve Earle. Earle also produced the album. It was recorded in Nashville between December 2007 and March 2008. The album had the dedication "to my Mom in her 96th year".

The album is released by Proper records in Europe and Razor & Tie in North America. It debuted on the UK Albums Chart at number 100. In the US it became her first charting album in 29 years, reaching number 128 on the Billboard 200 in its opening week. It was also nominated for a Grammy (Best Contemporary Folk Album).

== Track listings ==
1. "God Is God" (Steve Earle) – 3:29
2. "Rose of Sharon" (Eliza Gilkyson) – 3:34
3. "Scarlet Tide" (Elvis Costello, T Bone Burnett) – 2:25
4. "Day After Tomorrow" (Tom Waits, Kathleen Brennan) – 5:31
5. "Henry Russell's Last Words" (Diana Jones) – 3:37
6. "I Am a Wanderer" (Steve Earle) – 2:30
7. "Mary" (Patty Griffin) – 3:54
8. "Requiem" (Eliza Gilkyson) – 3:55
9. "The Lower Road" (Thea Gilmore) – 4:11
10. "Jericho Road" (Steve Earle) – 3:29

== Personnel ==
- Joan Baez – vocals, guitar
- Steve Earle – guitar, harmonium, backing vocals, tamboura
- Viktor Krauss – bass
- Kenny Malone – drums, percussion
- Tim O'Brien – fiddle, mandolin, bouzouki, backing vocals
- Darrell Scott – guitar, dobro, bouzouki, Hawaiian guitar, banjolin, resonator guitar, backing vocals
- Thea Gilmore – harmony vocals
- Siobhan Maher Kennedy – harmony vocals
- Ray Kennedy – tambourine

== Chart positions ==
Chart (2008)	Peak position
Belgian Albums (Ultratop Wallonia)	72
Dutch Albums (Album Top 100)	70
French Albums (SNEP)	124
German Albums (Offizielle Top 100)	95
New Zealand Albums (RMNZ)	40
UK Albums (OCC)	100
US Billboard 200	128
Scottish Albums (OCC)	88
UK Independent Albums (OCC)	14
