= Riley Baugus =

American musician and instrument builder

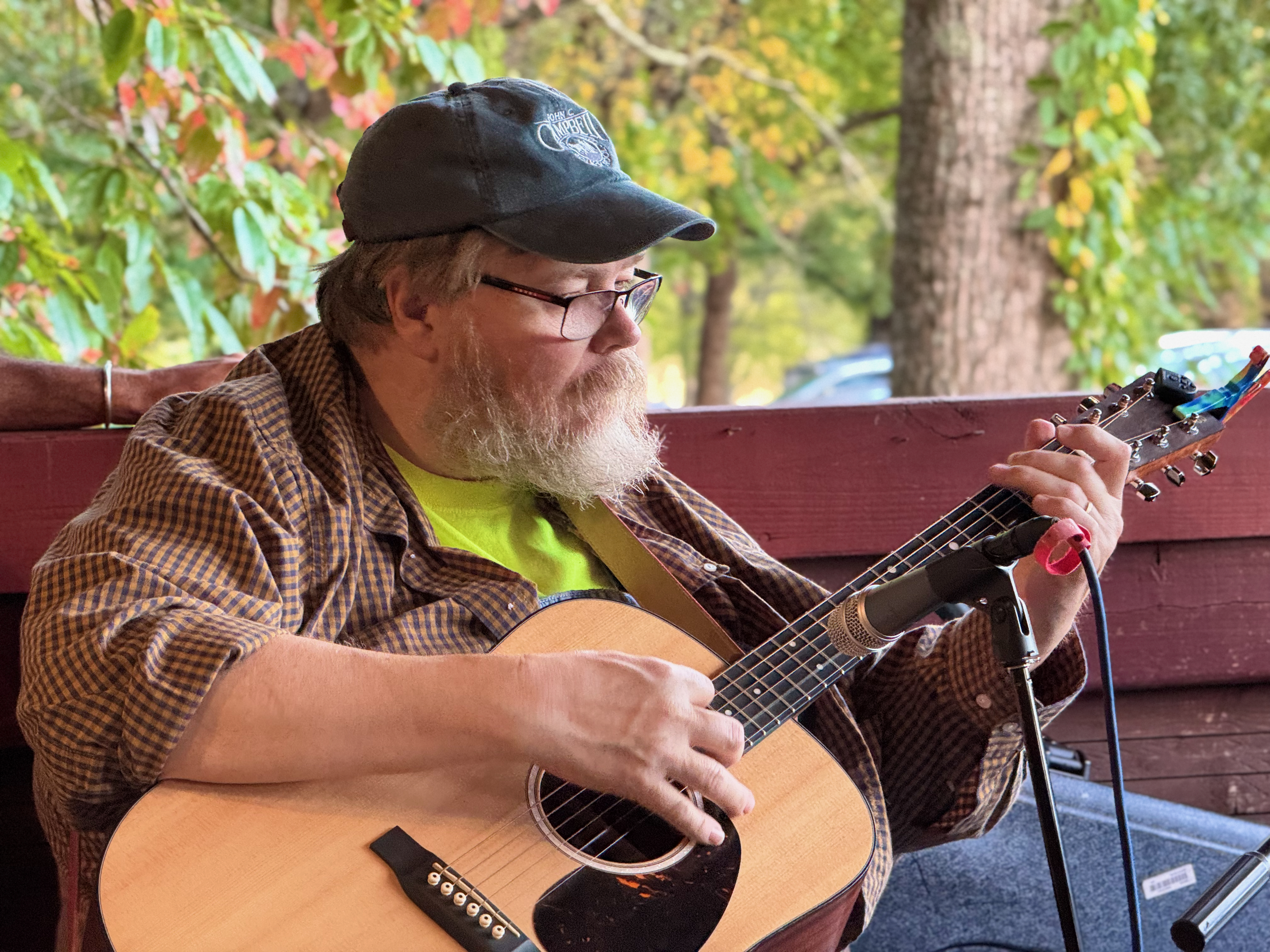
- Baugus at John C. Campbell Folk School

Background information
- Born: November 28, 1965 (age 60); Walkertown, North Carolina, U.S.
- Genres: Old Time American, Americana, Country
- Occupations: Old Time Musician; Instrument builder
- Instruments: Banjo, Vocals, Guitar, Fiddle
- Website: www.rileybaugus.com

Riley Baugus (born November 28, 1965) is an American old-time guitarist, banjo player, fiddler, singer and instrument builder from North Carolina.

== Early life ==
Baugus was born in Walkertown, North Carolina, near Winston-Salem, and grew up in the Regular Baptist tradition, which gave him a solid foundation in unaccompanied singing. His father had moved from Alleghany County, North Carolina, in the Blue Ridge Mountains, to Winston-Salem in the 1950s, looking for work, and his mother's family (from Surry County, North Carolina) had a similar trajectory; and both families brought their culture with them. He began playing the fiddle at age 10 and began playing the banjo at age 11, and grew up with the fiddler Kirk Sutphin. As a youth, he also had the opportunity to study with old-time musicians from Surry County, North Carolina and Grayson County, Virginia, including Tommy Jarrell, Robert Sykes, Dix Freeman, Verlin Clifton, and Paul Sutphin. He is influenced particularly by the Round Peak style of Surry County, North Carolina.

== Career ==
Baugus worked as a welder and blacksmith for 18 years before pursuing a career as a professional musician. He has performed throughout the United States and internationally in Canada, Ireland, Scotland, and England. He has played with several old-time string bands, including The Farmer's Daughters, The Konnarock Critters, The Red Hots, Backstep, and the Old Hollow Stringband. He tours regularly with Dirk Powell and Tim O'Brien, and frequently performs and tours with dancer Ira Bernstein, with the duo show Appalachian Roots.

He often performs as a guest musician with the Dirk Powell Band and the North Carolina folk band Polecat Creek. He sang on the soundtrack to the 2003 film Cold Mountain. He has recorded with Robert Plant, Alison Krauss, Willie Nelson, Dirk Powell, April Verch, and Martha Scanlan. He has taught banjo at the John C. Campbell Folk School in Brasstown, North Carolina; the Augusta Heritage Center's Old Time Week in Elkins, West Virginia; the Midwest Banjo Camp in Olivet, Michigan; and Banjo Camp North in Massachusetts.

Baugus released his first album, Life of Riley, in 2001. A second album, Long Steel Rail, was released in 2006.

On March 22, 2025 he was inducted into the Blue Ridge Music Hall of Fame.

He lives in Walkertown, North Carolina.

== Discography ==
=== Albums ===
Year	Album
2001	Life Of Riley (Yodel Ay Hee)
2006	Long Steel Rail (Sugar Hill)
2019	Little Black Train's a Comin' (Old Garden Records)

=== Collaborations ===
Year	Album
2002	Appalachian Roots with Ira Bernstein (Yodel Ay Hee)
2004	Going Home Shoes with The Lonesome Sisters (Tin Halo Music)
2010	Long Time Piedmont Pals with Kirk Sutphin (Old Blue Records)
2012	Lonesome Scenes with The Lonesome Sisters (Tin Halo Music)
2015	Tomorrow Morn with Dirk Powell (Wood and Steel Records)

=== Other appearances ===
Year	Album
1986	Old Time Music From North Carolina by The Old Hollow String Band (Flyin' Cloud)
1992	Ready To Roll by The Red Hots (Fire Ant Music)
1993	Impeached by The Red Hots (Bobville Productions / Hasty Records)
2001	Salt Sea Bound by Polecat Creek (Yodel Ay Hee)
2002	Grandpa's Favorites by Kirk Sutphin (Old 97 Wrecords)
2003	Rare Rags & Stringband Blues by Adam Tanner & The Dirty Rag Mob (Old 97 Wrecords)
2003	Cold Mountain: Music from the Miramax Motion Picture (Sony Music Entertainment)
2004	Time Again by Dirk Powell (Rounder Records)
2005	Come to the Mountain: Old Time Music for Modern Times (Rounder Records)
2005	Leaving Eden by Polecat Creek (Yodel Ay Hee)
2005	Elkhorn Riders feat. The Lonesome Sisters by Rench (Gangstagrass) (Rench Audio)
2006	The West Was Burning by Martha Scanlan (Sugar Hill Records)
2005	Ordinary Seasons by Polecat Creek (Yodel Ay Hee)
2007	Raising Sand by Alison Krauss and Robert Plant (Rounder Records)
2009	Frolic in Round Peak by Kevin Fore (Round Peak Banjos)
2010	Country Music by Willie Nelson (Rounder Records)
2010	Live & Lively by the New North Carolina Ramblers (Old Blue Records)
2011	That's How We Run by April Verch (Slab Town Records)
2012	The Mountain Music Project by Tara Linhardt, Danny Knicely (Mountain Music Project)
2017	Playing Favorites by Lillian Chase
2019	Just Around The Bend: Survival & Revival in Southern Banjo Sounds by Mike Seeger (Smithsonian Folkways)
