= The President Sang Amazing Grace =

2016 song by Zoe Mulford

"The President Sang Amazing Grace" is a 2016 song written by Zoe Mulford.

It was inspired by the Charleston church shooting of 2015. The song recounts the moment when President Barack Obama broke into an impromptu performance of the hymn "Amazing Grace" while delivering the eulogy for Clementa C. Pinckney.

Obama delivered the eulogy for Clementa C. Pinckney at the TD Arena of the College of Charleston on 26 June 2015. Pinckney was one of the nine victims of the June 2015 shooting at the Emanuel African Methodist Episcopal Church in Charleston, South Carolina. During his eulogy Obama recited the words of the hymn "Amazing Grace" before breaking down in tears and singing the hymn unprompted.

The song was written by the folk singer and songwriter Zoe Mulford. It appeared on her 2017 album Small Brown Birds. Mulford's recording was extensively played on independent folk radio shows.

It was covered by Joan Baez on her 2018 album Whistle Down the Wind. Baez said that after she heard Mulford's recording of the song on the radio she " ... just pulled over" as it was "so expressive of my thoughts and feelings, which are pretty fucking gloomy, but [Mulford] did it in such a beautiful way that's as dark as it is beautiful". Baez recalled that "for the first two weeks of trying to figure it out on the guitar, I kept crying".

The filmmaker and painter Jeff Scher directed a music video for Baez's performance of the song. Scher used pastels and watercolour to depict the victims of the shooting as well as the church and Obama.

The Kronos Quartet covered the song with singer Meklit on their 2020 album Long Time Passing, dedicated to the music of Pete Seeger.
