= Whistle Down the Wind (album) =

Studio album by Joan Baez
- Released: March 2, 2018
- Recorded: February 19–20, May 1–5 and September 25–27, 2017
- Studios: United Western Recorders, Hollywood, California
- Genre: Folk
- Label: Proper
- Producer: Joe Henry

Joan Baez chronology
Day After Tomorrow (2008)	Whistle Down the Wind (2018)

Singles from Whistle Down the Wind
- 1. "Whistle Down the Wind" Released: 8 January 2018

Whistle Down the Wind is the 26th (28th overall) and final studio album by American folk singer and musician Joan Baez, released on March 2, 2018, her first studio album in almost a decade. The album features songs written by such composers as Tom Waits, Josh Ritter and Mary Chapin Carpenter. Joe Henry produced the album.

Whistle Down the Wind was nominated for Best Folk Album at the 61st Annual Grammy Awards.

== Background ==
On November 8, 2017, Joan Baez announced that, in conjunction with her final tour of Europe in 2018, she would release a new studio album entitled Whistle Down the Wind.

It was produced by Joe Henry. It was recorded at United Recording in Hollywood, California over 10 days. The album was made over a period of three weeks. The album features songs written by such composers as Tom Waits, Josh Ritter and Mary Chapin Carpenter. It was released on March 2, 2018, and was her first studio album in almost a decade.

The album was released on vinyl, CD, and digital. Her final international September 2018 tour to promote Whistle Down the Wind included a digital copy of the record with each purchased ticket in the United States.

== Single ==
On January 8, 2018, Joan Baez made available on her website the first track from the album, "Whistle Down the Wind".

== Reception ==
Professional ratings
Aggregate scores
Source	Rating
Metacritic	77/100
Review scores
Source	Rating
AllMusic	4/5 stars
The Arts Desk	5/5 stars
Exclaim!	(6/10)
God Is in the TV	(8/10)
The Observer	4/5 stars
Pitchfork	(7.4/10)
PopMatters	(9/10)
Rolling Stone	4/5 stars
The Young Folks	(8/10)

The album features Baez singing covers of various contemporary songwriters, with NPR saying her choices "[amplify] Baez ever-present gift for interpretation." PopMatters said the album was "a beguilingly modest, humble work that wears with disarming lightness Baez's legendary status, instead placing the focus squarely on the songs."

The Herald Standard said that the album included a focus on "topical issues that are emotional and thought-provoking." The San Francisco Chronicle said that the "music is reassuringly spare, highlighting Baez’s rich, world-weary voice and the slowly unfolding melodies of politically minded tunes like 'Another World' and 'I Wish the Wars Were All Over' over a blanket of acoustic guitars, stately pianos and prudent rhythms." The Financial Times said it featured "pointedly chosen songs and starkly contemporary lyrics." Marin Independent Journal said it was "a tasteful and carefully curated collection of new songs by some of her favorite writers".

It received a score of 77/100 on Metacritic. The Guardian called it a "graceful farewell" and gave it 4 of 5 stars. Pitchfork gave it a score of 7.4/10, Rolling Stone gave it 4/5, AllMusic gave it 4/5, and Glide Magazine gave it 9/10.

== Track listing ==
No.	Title	Writer(s)	Length
1.	"Whistle Down the Wind"	Tom Waits	4:49
2.	"Be of Good Heart"	Josh Ritter	4:05
3.	"Another World"	Anohni	2:57
4.	"Civil War"	Joe Henry	4:22
5.	"The Things That We Are Made Of"	Mary Chapin Carpenter	5:10
6.	"The President Sang Amazing Grace"	Zoe Mulford	3:20
7.	"Last Leaf"	Waits, Kathleen Brennan	3:05
8.	"Silver Blade"	Josh Ritter	3:55
9.	"The Great Correction"	Eliza Gilkyson	3:43
10.	"I Wish the Wars Were All Over"	Tim Eriksen	3:35

== Personnel ==
- Joan Baez – vocals, guitar
- Joe Henry – production

== Charts ==
Chart (2018)	Peak position
Austrian Albums (Ö3 Austria)	23
Belgian Albums (Ultratop Flanders)	82
Belgian Albums (Ultratop Wallonia)	82
Canadian Albums (Billboard)	70
French Albums (SNEP)	65
German Albums (Offizielle Top 100)	8
Scottish Albums (Official Charts)	20
Swedish Albums (Sverigetopplistan)	43
Swiss Albums (Schweizer Hitparade)	13
UK Albums (Official Charts)	47
UK Americana Albums (Official Charts)	2
UK Independent Albums (Official Charts)	7
US Billboard 200	88
US Americana/Folk Albums (Billboard)	5
