= Cold Mountain (soundtrack) =

Soundtrack album by Various
- Released: December 9, 2003
- Studio: Abbey Road (London, UK); Sound Emporium (Nashville, Tennessee)
- Genre: Folk, old-time
- Length: 62:59
- Label: DMZ/Columbia
- Producer: T Bone Burnett

Cold Mountain is the soundtrack for the Civil War film Cold Mountain (2003) starring Jude Law, Nicole Kidman, and Renée Zellweger. The album was nominated for two Grammy Awards and was produced by T Bone Burnett. Two songs were nominated for Academy Awards: "You Will Be My Ain True Love", written by Sting, and "The Scarlet Tide", written by Burnett and Elvis Costello. Both songs were sung by Alison Krauss.

The soundtrack consists of Appalachian, roots music, and old-time music to accompany the era of the movie. Jack White, of the rock band the White Stripes, performs five songs and appears as a troubadour in the movie.

== Background ==
When T Bone Burnett was looking for a young musician who understood the music of Cold Mountain, the person he came up with was Jack White, a rock guitarist from Detroit who had a deep interest in blues and bluegrass music. White was acquainted with two songs that appeared on the soundtrack. When he was fifteen, he played "Sitting on Top of the World", and years later he performed "The Wayfaring Stranger" with a band. Burnett and White met and talked about music and listened to Dock Boggs, Son House, Jimmie Rodgers, and Blind Willie Johnson.

With the help of John Cohen, a musicologist and founding member of the New Lost City Ramblers, Burnett continued his quest for experts on early American music. He found Dirk Powell, who played banjo, the Reeltime Travelers, an old-time music band from Tennessee, and Tim Eriksen, a vocalist and guitarist who was familiar with Sacred Harp music. The song "Idumea" is an example of Sacred Harp music, also known as shape note because the notes printed on the sheet music bear shapes, such as squares and triangles, to show changes in pitch. After rehearsing with the Sacred Harp singers in a studio, Burnett decided that the style was best heard in Liberty Baptist Church in Henagar, Alabama. The church's sixty-three member choir appeared on the soundtrack. "Lady Margaret", sung by choir member Cassie Franklin, appeared on the soundtrack but not in the movie.

Sting wrote "You Will Be My Ain True Love" for Cold Mountain, and it was sung by Alison Krauss. Burnett and Elvis Costello wrote "The Scarlet Tide", also sung by Krauss. Both songs received Academy Award nominations for Best Original Song and Grammy Award nominations for Best Song Written for Visual Media. The soundtrack reached No. 51 on the Billboard 200 chart. As of 2004, the soundtrack has sold 260,000 copies in United States. The DVD of the movie included a concert documentary with performances by some of the musicians who contributed to the soundtrack.

== Awards and honors ==
- BAFTA Award for Best Film Music, T Bone Burnett, Gabriel Yared
- World Soundtrack Award for Best Original Score of the Year, Gabriel Yared
- Nomination, Academy Award for Best Original Score, Gabriel Yared
- Nomination, Academy Award for Best Original Song, "The Scarlet Tide", written by T Bone Burnett and Elvis Costello, sung by Alison Krauss
- Nomination, Academy Award for Best Original Song, "You Will Be My Ain True Love", written by Sting, sung by Alison Krauss
- Nomination, Grammy Award for Best Compilation Soundtrack Album for a Motion Picture, Television or Other Visual Media
- Nomination, Golden Globe Award for Best Original Song, "You Will Be My Ain True Love", Sting, Alison Krauss

== Track listing ==
No.	Title	Writer(s)	Performer(s)	Length
1.	"Wayfaring Stranger"	Traditional	Jack White	4:25
2.	"Like a Songbird That Has Fallen"	Bob Neuwirth/T Bone Burnett	Reeltime Travelers	3:13
3.	"I Wish My Baby Was Born"	Traditional	Riley Baugus/Tim Eriksen/Tim O'Brien	3:09
4.	"The Scarlet Tide"	Burnett/Elvis Costello	Alison Krauss	2:59
5.	"The Cuckoo"	Traditional	Riley Baugus/Tim Eriksen	1:39
6.	"Sitting on Top of the World"	Lonnie Chatmon/Walter Vinson	Jack White	3:48
7.	"Am I Born to Die?"	Traditional	Tim Eriksen	2:32
8.	"You Will Be My Ain True Love"	Sting	Alison Krauss	2:31
9.	"I'm Going Home"	Traditional	Sacred Harp Singers	2:18
10.	"Never Far Away"	Jack White	Jack White	3:40
11.	"Christmas Time Will Soon Be Over"	Traditional/Jack White	Jack White	3:16
12.	"Ruby with the Eyes That Sparkle"	Traditional	Stuart Duncan/Dirk Powell	3:11
13.	"Lady Margret"	Traditional	Cassie Franklin	3:02
14.	"Great High Mountain"	Traditional	Jack White	4:33
15.	"Anthem"	Gabriel Yared	Gabriel Yared	3:24
16.	"Ada Plays"	Gabriel Yared	Gabriel Yared	3:18
17.	"Ada and Inman"	Gabriel Yared	Gabriel Yared	5:03
18.	"Love Theme"	Gabriel Yared	Gabriel Yared	3:40
19.	"Idumea"	Traditional/Charles Wesley	Sacred Harp Singers	3:18
Total length:				62:59

== Personnel ==
- Alison Krauss – vocals
- Jack White – guitar, vocals
- Dirk Powell – banjo
- Stuart Duncan – fiddle
- Gabriel Yared – piano
- Simon Chamberlain – piano
- Keith Ciancia – piano
- Nick Bucknall – clarinet
- David Theodore – oboe
- David Schnaufer – dulcimer
- Norman Blake – mandolin
- Dennis Crouch – double bass
- Martin Tillman – cello
- Rolf Wilson – violin
- Patrick Warren – harmonium
- Susan Bohling – Cor Anglais
- Riley Baugus – vocal harmony
- Tim Eriksen – vocal harmony
- Cassie Franklin – vocal harmony
- Brendan Gleeson – vocal harmony
- Sting – vocal harmony
- Cheryl White – vocal harmony
- Reeltime Travelers
- Sacred Harp Singers
- Tim O'Brien
- Heidi Andrade
- Roy Andrade
- Martha Scanlan
- Brandon Story
- Thomas Sneed

Production

- T Bone Burnett – producer
- Anthony Minghella – executive producer
- Bob Neuwirth – associate music producer
- Gabriel Yared – orchestration, score producer
- John Bell – orchestration
- Nick Ingman – orchestration
- Kevin Townend – orchestration
- Harry Rabinowitz – conductor
- David Hartley – arranger
- Ralph Stanley – arranger
- Simon Osborne – engineer
- Mike Piersante – engineer, mixing
- John Richards – engineer, mixing
- Gavin Lurssen – mastering
