= Polecat Creek (band) =

American folk-music band

- Origin: Greensboro, North Carolina
- Genres: Bluegrass, traditional
- Years active: 1990s-present
- Members: Kari Sickenberger, Laurelyn Dosset, Natalya Weinstein, Riley Baugus
- Website: http://polecatcreek.net/

Polecat Creek is a folk band based in North Carolina. It was formed in the mid-1990s by Kari Sickenberger and Laurelyn Dossett, after they met at a book club in Greensboro, NC. They have released three CDs: Salt Sea Bound (2002), Leaving Eden (2004), and Ordinary Seasons (2007).

Polecat Creek won the neo-traditional contest at the 2006 Appalachian String Band Festival. Dossett won the Chris Austin Songwriting Contest at MerleFest in 2004 in the gospel category. The group has performed with Garrison Keillor and played various festivals — including MerleFest, City Stages (Birmingham, Alabama), First Night Raleigh, FloydFest, and Shakori Hills, as well as concerts and harmony workshops around the Southeast. They are frequently joined in concert by Riley Baugus on banjo and guitar and Natalya Weinstein on fiddle.

According to a notice on the band website the members have decided to shut down their website as a consequence of spending more time on individual projects.
