= Peter Buchanan-Smith =

American artist

- Born: April 7, 1972 (age 54); Canada
- Education: School of Visual Arts
- Notable work: Best Made Co.

Peter Buchanan-Smith (born April 7, 1972) is a designer, teacher, entrepreneur, and the founder of Best Made Co.

== Biography ==
Peter Buchanan-Smith was born on April 7, 1972, in Canada. He attended the School of Visual Arts in New York City in the MFA Designer as Author program and received his master's degree in 2001. His M.F.A. thesis in graphic design was developed into a book published in 2001 by Princeton Architectural Press entitled Speck: A Curious Collection of Uncommon Things.

After graduation, Buchanan-Smith worked at The New York Times, where he was art director of the Op-Ed page for September 11, 2001, and Paper magazine, where he was creative director from 2005 to 2008.

He has been the design director for Isaac Mizrahi's fashion house and has collaborated with Maira Kalman, with whom he designed the illustrated re-issue of Strunk & White's classic grammar text, The Elements of Style. In 2005, he was awarded a Grammy for the design of Wilco’s best-selling album A Ghost is Born.

In 2009, Buchanan-Smith founded New York City-based design firm Buchanan-Smith LLC, which produces branding, packaging, and identities.

In 2009, he founded Best Made Co., a company that develops artisanal tools and adventure products after moving to South Orange, New Jersey and started building things. The first product he designed for Best Made Co. was a collection of functional axes decorated in a scheme of colorful spots and stripes; acquired by foresters and collectors (including David Lynch), the axes have been exhibited at the Saatchi Gallery in London. He left the company in 2019.

In 2023 he bought Best Made Co. back from Duluth Trading, following Duluth's acquisition of the company in 2020.

=== Style and themes ===
Clear and expressive, Buchanan-Smith's work has often been referenced by other designers, and has been featured in The New York Times, I.D. magazine and the AIGA's Fresh Dialogue Four: New Voices in Graphic Design. In his work, Buchanan-Smith has often explored the relationships between people and objects, also drawing attention to the value of the everyday and the nature of luxury.

== Bibliography ==
- Speck: A Curious Collection of Uncommon Things, Princeton Architectural Press, 2001.
