= Tim Eriksen =

American singer-songwriter

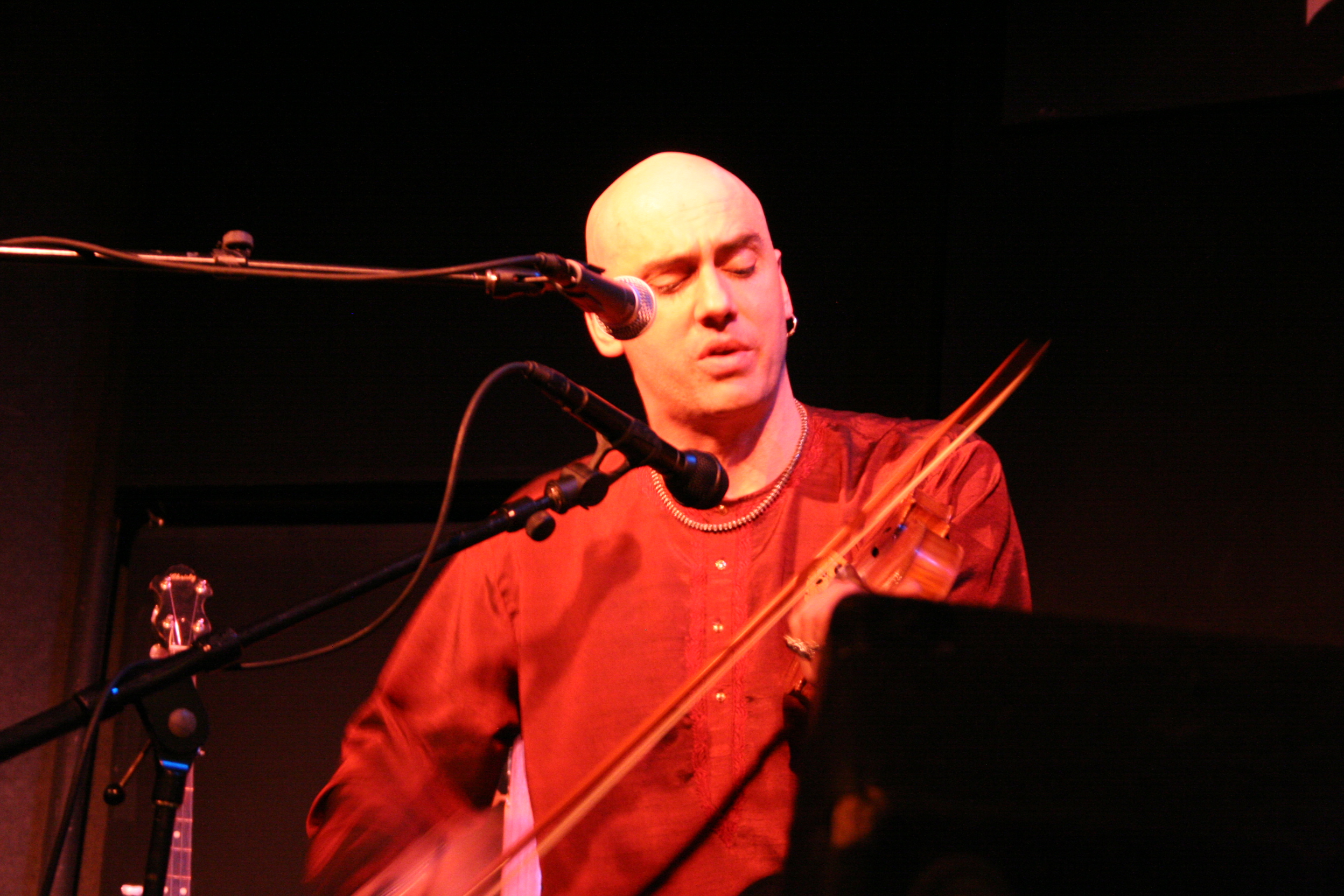
- Tim Eriksen performing at the Iron Horse, Northampton, MA, Feb 29, 2008

Background information
- Origin: Northampton, Massachusetts
- Genres: Traditional folk, folk punk, punk rock,
- Occupations: Musicologist, professor
- Instruments: Violin, banjo, guitar, vocalist, bass guitar, saraswati veena, bajo sexto
- Years active: 1987–Present

Tim Eriksen (b. 1966) is an American musician, musicologist, and professor. He is the leader of the band Cordelia's Dad, a solo artist, and was a performer and consultant for the award-winning soundtrack of the film Cold Mountain.

== Cordelia's Dad ==
Cordelia's Dad combines traditional/old-time music and punk rock influences to create a unique folk-punk sound. The Village Voice describes the band as "semi-reformed punks turned shape-note singers...recently gone entirely acoustic, but buzzing with metaphorical electricity". The band has released nine full-length albums, played festivals such as The Newport Folk Festival, and toured with notable bands Nirvana, Uncle Tupelo, and Weezer.

== Musicologist ==
Eriksen successfully defended his PhD in ethnomusicology at Wesleyan University in May 2015, having received an M.A. in the same discipline from Wesleyan in 1993, and has served as a visiting music professor at Dartmouth College, Amherst College, Hampshire College and the University of Minnesota. He has also taught in Poland and the Czech Republic. Additionally, Eriksen is a collector of variations of folk songs, and has conducted extensive research on traditional Yugoslavian music. Eriksen shared his extensive knowledge of folk music while a consultant for the soundtrack of the film Cold Mountain. In 2011, Eriksen taught a class on the history of the Sacred Harp at Smith College.

== Solo artist ==
Eriksen performed on the Cold Mountain soundtrack, singing with Riley Baugus on traditional songs such as "I Wish My Baby Was Born" and "The Cuckoo". He was part of The Great High Mountain Tour, which celebrated the traditional music of Cold Mountain and O Brother, Where Art Thou?

T-Bone Burnett, the producer of the Cold Mountain soundtrack, had Eriksen teach performers the complex style of Sacred Harp singing.

Eriksen has also released seven solo albums: Tim Eriksen; Every Sound Below; Northern Roots Live In Namest; Soul Of The January Hills; Star in the East; Banjo, Fiddle And Voice; and Josh Billings Voyage or, Cosmopolite on the Cotton Road. The Pop Matters review of Every Sound Below describes it as a "stunning mixture of traditional hymns, songs from the American Civil War, and Eriksen's own compositions".

The Sacred Harp documentary Awake, My Soul's accompanying soundtrack Help Me to Sing: Songs of the Sacred Harp features a song by Eriksen and one by Cordelia's Dad. Paste Magazine describes Eriksen's performance of Sacred Harp songs at an Atlanta concert as "stand-out" and said Eriksen "was best at adapting the raw power of Sacred Harp to his own arrangements."

Eriksen has also been a guest on the radio show A Prairie Home Companion, where he performed the traditional folk song "O, Death" on October 29, 2005. He also played Bosnian pop music with the band Zabe I Babe. In 2018, his arrangement, including an original tune, of the song "I Wish the Wars Were All Over" was recorded by Joan Baez on her 2018 album Whistle Down the Wind.

== Personal life ==
Eriksen is a Christian, and describes himself as "religious as hell." He was married to the ethnomusicologist Mirjana (Minja) Laušević, a native of Sarajevo and associate professor at the University of Minnesota in Minneapolis, until her death from a long illness in July 2007.
