= Ferry Tales =

- Directed by: Katja Esson
- Written by: Katja Esson
- Produced by: Katja Esson, Sabine Schenk, Corinna Sager
- Cinematography: Martina Radwan, Katja Esson
- Edited by: Sabine Hoffman, Moira Demos
- Music by: Cassis, Robby Baier
- Distributed by: Women Make Movies
- Release date: 2003
- Running time: 40 minutes
- Country: United States
- Language: English

Ferry Tales is a 2003 American short documentary film written, produced and directed by Katja Esson. It follows the conversations of women in the powder room of the Staten Island Ferry during the morning commute from Staten Island to Manhattan. It was nominated for the Academy Award for Best Documentary Short.

== Production ==
Inspired by an idea of Cassis Birgit Staudt, Katja Esson decided in July 2001 to create a sort of ‘working-girl’ documentary about the women who occupy the ladies' bathroom on the ferry each morning.

Filming took place soon after the September 11 attacks.

== Film Festivals & Awards ==
'Esson's film gives a fantastic glimpse into one of the countless secret sub-cultures of New York. Her brilliant portrayal rethinks class and gender and turns our ideas of the suburban/urban divide on their head'. (K.E. Flemming, New York University)

Academy Award Nominee for Best Short Doc

Women's Network Awards - Best Documentary Film

Underdog Film Festival - Best Doc

Annapolis Film Festival - Honorable Mention

Woodstock Film Festival - Honorable Mention
