= Martha Scanlan =

Old-time, traditional singer

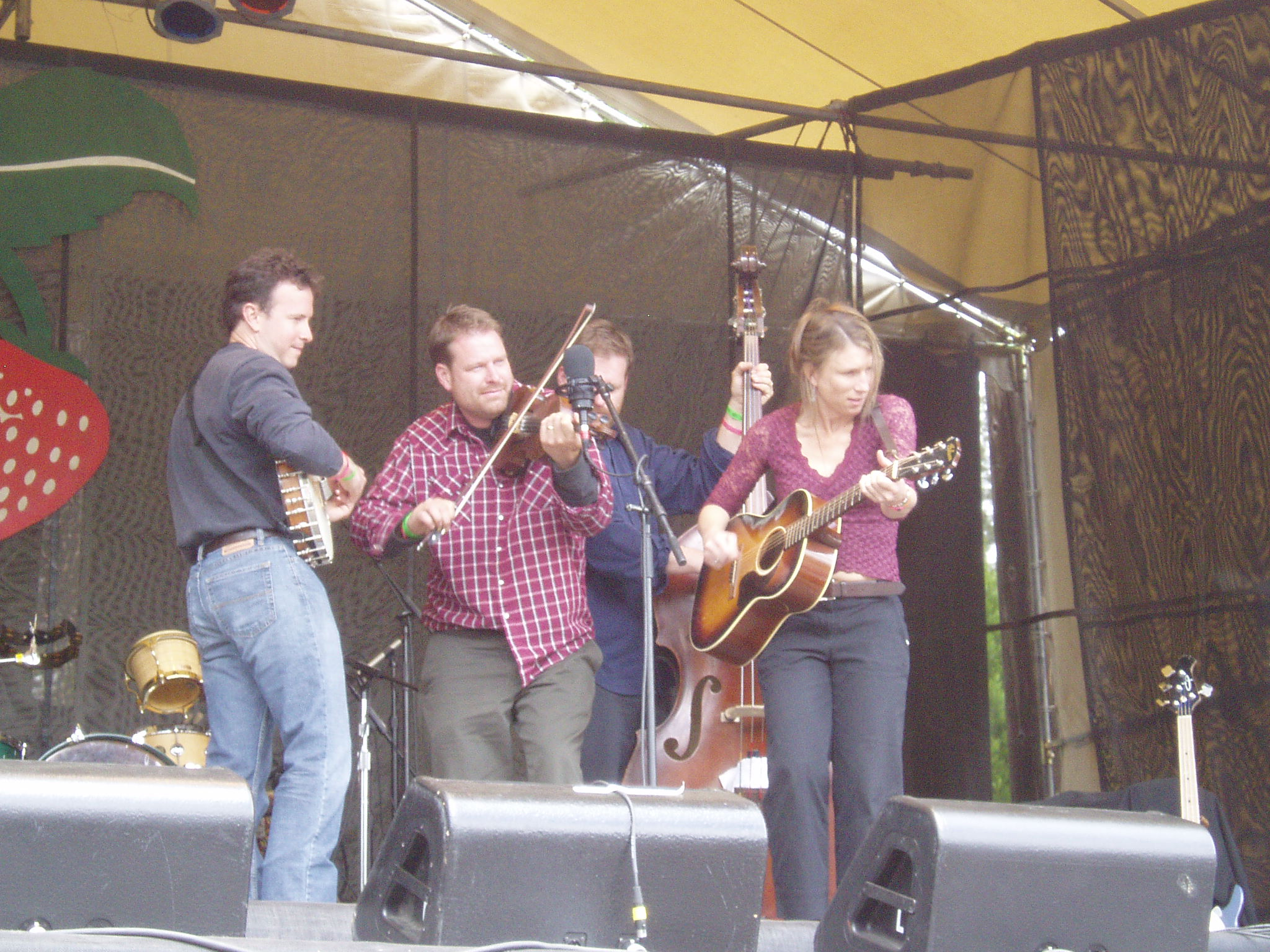
Scanlan and band onstage at the 2006 Strawberry Spring Music Festival (Scanlan on the far right)

Martha Scanlan is an American singer-songwriter and musician, based in Montana.

Scanlan has appeared on The Bob Edwards Show, NPR’s What’s In A Song, Mountain Stage, Etown, Woodsongs Old-Time Radio Hour, and (as a member of the Reeltime Travelers) on T Bone Burnett’s soundtrack for the 2003 film, Cold Mountain.

In 2025, Scanlan’s song “Higher Rock” appeared on Robert Plant’s release with his band Saving Grace.

Scanlan tours nationally and internationally and has released four solo albums and one collaborative project with Portland musician and producer Jon Neufeld.
