= The Scarlet Tide =

Song by Alison Krauss

from the album Cold Mountain
- Released: December 9, 2003
- Genre: Folk
- Length: 2:59
- Label: Columbia
- Songwriters: T Bone Burnett, Elvis Costello
- Producer: T Bone Burnett

"The Scarlet Tide" is a song by T Bone Burnett and Elvis Costello. It was written for the 2003 film Cold Mountain and sung by Alison Krauss.

According to Costello, Burnett "always said 'Scarlet Tide' was an anti-fear song."

The song was nominated for the Academy Award for Best Original Song and the Grammy Award for Best Song Written for Visual Media.

In 2004, a new version of the song performed by Elvis Costello and Emmylou Harris appeared as the closing track on the Costello album The Delivery Man.

Joan Baez included the song on her 2008 album Day After Tomorrow.
