= Katja Esson =

German-American filmmaker

Katja Esson is a German-American filmmaker based in Miami, Florida. She was born and raised in Germany.

Her documentary Ferry Tales received an Academy Award nomination for Best Documentary (Short Subject) in 2004. She is the only female German filmmaker ever nominated for a documentary at the Academy Awards.

== Early life and education ==
Esson was born Katja Kümmerle, in Hamburg, Germany. After graduating from secondary school in Hamburg, she moved to the United States to study film, earning a Bachelor in Motion Pictures and Theater at the University of Miami, Florida.

== Career ==
Esson began working in the film industry as a director's assistant on German features, and a production assistant in Miami. She moved to New York in 1994. She was married to Cuban painter Tomas Esson.

Since the year 2000, she has worked as a writer-director. Her documentaries have screened internationally on numerous festivals in the US, Asia and Europe, and have won international awards. In 2011, her film Poetry of Resilience won the award for Best Short Documentary at the Woodstock Film Festival. In 2012, her film Skydancer was nominated for three awards at the Shanghai Television Festival (Best Documentary, Best Director, Best Camera).

Her films have also been broadcast on PBS, HBO and channel Thirteen, as well as Arte and ARD in Europe.

In 2004, she started her own production company, Penelope Pictures.

In 2007, Esson received the Simons Public Humanities Fellowship and was nominated for a Rockefeller Media Grant.

== Filmography ==
- Razing Liberty Square (2023)
- American Rivers (2016)
- Backroads USA (2013)
- Skydancer (2011)
- Poetry of Resilience (2011).
- Latching On – The Politics of Breastfeeding (2010)
- Hooker, Harlot, Whore – The Oldest Profession (2009)
- A Season of Madness (2006)
- Hole in the Sky – The Scars of 9/11 (2006)
- Ferry Tales (2003)
- Vertical Traveler (2001)

== Awards and nominations (selection) ==
- 2012 nomination, Shanghai Film and TV Festival Magnolia Award for Best Documentary Skydancer (2011)
- 2011 Woodstock Film Festival Diane Seligman Award for Best Short Documentary: Poetry of Resilience (2011)
- 2009 US International Film and Video Festival Silver Screen Award: Hooker, Harlot, Whore – The Oldest Profession (2009)
- 2006 World Media Festival Gold Award: Hole in the Sky (2006)
- 2004 nomination, Academy Award for Best Documentary (Short Subject): Ferry Tales (2003)

== See also ==
- List of German-speaking Academy Award winners and nominees
