= You Will Be My Ain True Love =

Song by Alison Krauss and Sting

from the album Cold Mountain
- Language: English
- Released: November 2003
- Recorded: 2003
- Genre: Country/Bluegrass
- Length: 2:31
- Songwriter(s): Sting
- Producer(s): Alison Krauss & Sting

"You Will Be My Ain True Love" is a song written and performed by Sting and Alison Krauss from 2003, in the film Cold Mountain. The song was nominated for an Academy Award, a Grammy Award and the Golden Globe Award for Best Original Song.

The song is a notable example of the modern use of a drone bass.

Alison Krauss included it on her 2007 compilation, A Hundred Miles or More: A Collection and Sting re-recorded it for his 2010 album, Symphonicities.

== Music video ==
The music video for "You Will Be My Ain True Love" depicts Alison Krauss and Sting performing it live, interspersed with scenes from the film, which stars Nicole Kidman, Jude Law and Renée Zellweger.

== See also ==
- Cold Mountain (soundtrack)
