= Cold Mountain (film) =

2003 film by Anthony Minghella

- Theatrical release poster
- Directed by: Anthony Minghella
- Screenplay by: Anthony Minghella
- Based on: Cold Mountain by Charles Frazier
- Produced by: Sydney Pollack; William Horberg; Albert Berger; Ron Yerxa
- Starring: Jude Law; Nicole Kidman; Renée Zellweger; Eileen Atkins; Brendan Gleeson; Philip Seymour Hoffman; Natalie Portman; Giovanni Ribisi; Donald Sutherland; Ray Winstone
- Cinematography: John Seale
- Edited by: Walter Murch
- Music by: Gabriel Yared
- Production companies: Mirage Enterprises; Bona Fide Productions; Castel Film Romania; Cattleya
- Distributed by: Miramax Films
- Release date: December 25, 2003 (United States)
- Running time: 154 minutes
- Countries: United States; Romania; Italy; United Kingdom
- Language: English
- Budget: $79 million
- Box office: $173 million

Cold Mountain is a 2003 epic period war drama film written and directed by Anthony Minghella. The film is based on the bestselling 1997 novel by Charles Frazier. It stars Jude Law, Nicole Kidman, and Renée Zellweger with Eileen Atkins, Brendan Gleeson, Kathy Baker, Philip Seymour Hoffman, Natalie Portman, Jack White, Giovanni Ribisi, Donald Sutherland, and Ray Winstone in supporting roles. The film tells the story of a wounded deserter from the Confederate army close to the end of the American Civil War, who journeys home to reunite with the woman he loves. The film was a co-production of companies in Italy, Romania, and the United States.

Cold Mountain was released theatrically on December 25, 2003, by Miramax Films. It emerged a critical and commercial success, grossing over $173 million. It received seven nominations at the 76th Academy Awards, including Best Actor (Law), with Zellweger winning Best Supporting Actress.

== Plot ==
When North Carolina secedes from the Union on May 20, 1861, the young men of Cold Mountain enlist in the Confederate States Army. Among them is W.P. Inman, a carpenter who has fallen in love with Ada Monroe, the preacher's daughter who came from Charleston, South Carolina, to care for her father. Their courtship is interrupted by the war, but they share their first kiss the day Inman leaves for battle. Ada promises to wait for him.

Three years later, Inman fights in the Battle of the Crater and survives. He then comforts a dying acquaintance from Cold Mountain, while fellow soldier Stobrod Thewes plays a tune on his fiddle. Inman is later wounded in a skirmish, and as he lies in a hospital near death, a nurse reads him a letter from Ada, who pleads for Inman to come home to her.

Inman recovers and deserts. Embarking on a long trek back to Cold Mountain, he encounters corrupt preacher Veasey and stops him from drowning his impregnated slave. Exiled from his parish, Veasey joins Inman on his journey. They meet a young man, Junior, and join him and his family for dinner. Junior betrays the duo to the Confederate Home Guard, who take Inman and Veasey away along with other deserters. Veasey and the group are killed in a skirmish with Union cavalry; Inman is left for dead. An elderly hermit finds Inman and nurses him back to health. Inman eventually meets grieving young widow Sara and her infant child Ethan, and stays the night at her cabin. The next morning, three Union soldiers arrive demanding food; they hold Ethan hostage and try to rape Sara, which forces Inman and Sara to kill them.

Back in Cold Mountain, Ada's father has died. With no money and little means to run the family farm in Black Cove, she survives on the kindness of her neighbors, particularly Esco and Sally Swanger, who eventually send for Ruby Thewes, an experienced farmer (and Stobrod's daughter), to help. Together they bring Black Cove to working order and become close friends. Ada continues to write letters to Inman, hoping they will reunite and renew their romance. Ada has several tense encounters with Captain Teague, the leader of the local Home Guard who covets Ada and her property. One day, Teague and his men kill Esco. They torture Sally to coax her deserter sons out of hiding and kill them as well. Ada and Ruby rescue Sally, who is traumatized and rendered mute. The women celebrate Christmas with Stobrod, who has come to Cold Mountain with fellow deserters and musicians Pangle and Georgia.

While camping in the woods one night, Stobrod and Pangle are cornered by Teague and the Guard while Georgia secretly watches. Pangle inadvertently reveals they are deserters, and the Guard shoots Pangle and Stobrod. Georgia escapes and informs Ruby and Ada, who find Pangle dead and Stobrod badly wounded. The women and Stobrod take shelter in an abandoned Cherokee camp. Ada hunts for food and is reunited with Inman, who has finally returned to Cold Mountain. They return to the camp and spend the night consummating their love. Heading home, Ada and Ruby are surrounded by Teague and his men, who had captured and tortured Georgia to learn their whereabouts. Inman arrives, and a gunfight occurs, resulting in Teague and most of his posse dying. Inman chases Bosie, Teague's lieutenant, and exchange fast draws. Bosie is killed, and Inman is mortally wounded. Ada finds and comforts Inman, who dies in her arms.

Years later, it is revealed that Ada's night with Inman produced a daughter, Grace Inman, and that Ruby has married Georgia and borne two children. With Stobrod and Sally, the family celebrates Easter together at Black Cove.

== Cast ==
- Jude Law as William "W. P." Inman
- Nicole Kidman as Ada Monroe
- Renée Zellweger as Ruby Thewes
- Eileen Atkins as Maddy
- Brendan Gleeson as Stobrod Thewes
- Philip Seymour Hoffman as Reverend Solomon Veasey
- Natalie Portman as Sara
- Giovanni Ribisi as Junior
- Donald Sutherland as Reverend Monroe
- Ray Winstone as Teague
- Kathy Baker as Sally Swanger
- James Gammon as Esco Swanger
- Charlie Hunnam as Bosie
- Jack White as Georgia
- Ethan Suplee as Pangle
- Jena Malone as Ferry Girl
- Melora Walters as Lila
- Lucas Black as Oakley
- Taryn Manning as Shyla
- Tom Aldredge as Blind Man
- Cillian Murphy as Bardolph
- Jay Tavare as Swimmer
- Emily Deschanel as Mrs. Morgan
- James Rebhorn as Doctor
- Richard Brake as Nym

== Production ==
In 1997, United Artists bought the rights to Cold Mountain for Anthony Minghella to write and direct, with Sydney Pollack as producer. MGM/United Artists and Miramax Films then announced a deal to produce eight films together, sharing the profits. Historical painter Don Troiani was hired and served as historical advisor to the production.

As the script was developed, the scope of the film grew from a period love-story of a $40 million budget into an expensive epic. The budget grew to nearly $120 million, with Minghella having trouble finding American landscapes that could pass for 19th-century towns. Tom Cruise, at the time married to Nicole Kidman, wanted to play Inman, but the studio did not want to meet his $20 million fee demand. To get the budget down, production was moved to Romania. Principal photography started on July 10, 2002, but during filming, in October 2002, MGM pulled out. Executive producer Harvey Weinstein was going to cancel the shoot, but, with Minghella already in pre-production, Weinstein agreed to fund the $80 million project after receiving a $10 million tax break.

=== Location ===
Cold Mountain, where the film is set, is a real mountain located within the Pisgah National Forest, Haywood County, North Carolina. However, the film was shot mostly in Romania, with numerous scenes shot in Virginia, South Carolina, and North Carolina. The film was one of an increasing number of Hollywood productions made in Eastern Europe as a result of lower costs in the region, and because, in this instance, Transylvania had lower infrastructure, such as power cables and paved roads, and was thus less marked by modern life than the Appalachians.

=== Editing ===
The film marked a technological and industry turnaround in editing. Walter Murch edited Cold Mountain on Apple's sub-$1000 Final Cut Pro software "using several off-the-shelf PowerMac G4 computers". This was a leap for such a big-budgeted film, where expensive Avid systems are usually the standard editing system. His efforts on the film were documented in the 2005 book Behind the Seen: How Walter Murch Edited Cold Mountain Using Apple's Final Cut Pro and What This Means for Cinema.

== Reception ==
=== Box office ===
Cold Mountain grossed $95.6 million in the United States and Canada and $77.4 million in other territories, for a worldwide total of $173 million. Executive producer Harvey Weinstein said the film would break-even if it grossed $135 million. The film made $14.5 million in its opening weekend, finishing third at the box office. It made $11.7 million in its second weekend and $7.9 million in its third, finishing fourth both times.

=== Critical response ===
Cold Mountain opened to positive reviews from critics, with Law, Kidman and Zellweger's performance receiving widespread critical acclaim. On the review aggregator website Rotten Tomatoes, 69% of 226 critics' reviews are positive. The website's consensus reads: "The well-crafted Cold Mountain has an epic sweep and captures the horror and brutal hardship of war." Metacritic, which uses a weighted average, assigned the film a score of 73 out of 100, based on 41 critics, indicating "generally favorable" reviews. Audiences surveyed by CinemaScore gave the film an average grade of B+ on scale of A+ to F.

Movie critic Roger Ebert gave the film three stars out of four, noting, "It evokes a backwater of the Civil War with rare beauty, and lights up with an assortment of colorful supporting characters." Richard Corliss, film critic for Time, gave the film a positive review. He called it "A grand and poignant movie epic about what is lost in war and what's worth saving in life. It is also a rare blend of purity and maturity—the year's most rapturous love story." In his movie guide, Leonard Maltin gave the film 3 1/2 stars out of 4, writing "Minghella's adaptation of the Charles Frazier best-seller captures both the grimness of battle and the starkness of life on the home front in the South," and concluded the film was "meticulously crafted" with "first-rate performances all around."

=== Top ten lists ===
Cold Mountain was listed on many critics' top ten lists of 2003.

- 1st – Stephen Hunter, The Washington Post
- 1st – Megan Lehmann, New York Post
- 2nd – Jonathan Foreman, New York Post
- 3rd – Ruthie Stein, San Francisco Chronicle
- 5th – Richard Corliss, TIME Magazine
- 5th – Peter Travers, Rolling Stone
- 7th – Lou Lumenick, New York Post
- 7th – Jonathan Rosenbaum, Chicago Reader
- 8th – Mike Clark, USA Today
- 8th – Wesley Morris, The Boston Globe
- Top 10 (listed alphabetically) – Kenneth Turan, Los Angeles Times

=== Historical accuracy ===
Several scholars of historical studies reviewed the film for its representation of North Carolina during the Civil War, especially the state's mountainous western region. Their justification is the effect popular media have on national and worldwide perceptions of Appalachian people, particularly southern Appalachians in this case. The opinions vary, but the consensus among them is the historical context of the movie is close to the scholarship.

Scholars praised the film for its conformity to the historical scholarship in other subjects, with one saying "The final product should... provide so unflinching a portrayal of the bleak and unsettling realities of a far less familiar version of the Civil War, but one that would be all too recognizable to thousands of hardscrabble southern men and women who lived through it."

One scholar said, "Some of the best of the soundtrack was not composed for the movie but garnered from the body of time-tested and proven masterpieces of an earlier rural American culture." Such selections were not necessarily performed authentically in the film: the two Sacred Harp songs, although generally authentic to the period and region, contained vocal parts not yet written at that time.

The beginning Battle of the Crater is depicted as happening in broad daylight but it began at 4:44 am with the detonation of the mine.

== Soundtrack ==
Cold Mountain: Music from the Motion Picture shares producer T Bone Burnett with the soundtrack for O Brother, Where Art Thou?, a largely old-time and folk album with limited radio play that still enjoyed commercial success, and garnered a Grammy. As a result, comparisons were drawn between the two albums. Burnett brought in musician and scholar Tim Eriksen to teach the performers Sacred Harp singing, which features prominently in the soundtrack.

It features songs written by Jack White of The White Stripes (who also appeared in the film in the role of Georgia), Elvis Costello and Sting. Costello and Sting's contributions, "The Scarlet Tide" and "You Will Be My Ain True Love", were both nominated for the Academy Award for Best Original Song and featured vocals by bluegrass singer Alison Krauss. Gabriel Yared's Oscar-nominated score is represented by four tracks amounting to approximately fifteen minutes of music.

== Awards ==
Award	Category	Recipient/Nominee	Result
76th Academy Awards	Best Actor	Jude Law	Nominated
76th Academy Awards	Best Supporting Actress	Renée Zellweger	Won
76th Academy Awards	Best Cinematography	John Seale	Nominated
76th Academy Awards	Best Film Editing	Walter Murch	Nominated
76th Academy Awards	Best Original Score	Gabriel Yared	Nominated
76th Academy Awards	Best Original Song	"The Scarlet Tide"	Nominated
76th Academy Awards	Best Original Song	"You Will Be My Ain True Love"	Nominated
57th British Academy Film Awards	Best Film	Cold Mountain	Nominated
57th British Academy Film Awards	Best Direction	Anthony Minghella	Nominated
57th British Academy Film Awards	Best Actor in a Leading Role	Jude Law	Nominated
57th British Academy Film Awards	Best Actress in a Supporting Role	Renée Zellweger	Won
57th British Academy Film Awards	Best Adapted Screenplay	Anthony Minghella	Nominated
57th British Academy Film Awards	Best Cinematography	John Seale	Nominated
57th British Academy Film Awards	Best Costume Design	Ann Roth and Carlo Poggioli	Nominated
57th British Academy Film Awards	Best Editing	Walter Murch	Nominated
57th British Academy Film Awards	Best Makeup and Hair	Paul Engelen and Ivana Primorac	Nominated
57th British Academy Film Awards	Best Original Music	Gabriel Yared and T Bone Burnett	Won
57th British Academy Film Awards	Best Production Design	Dante Ferretti	Nominated
57th British Academy Film Awards	Best Sound	Eddy Joseph, Ivan Sharrock, Walter Murch, Mike Prestwood Smith and Matthew Gough	Nominated
57th British Academy Film Awards	Outstanding British Film	Sydney Pollack, William Horberg, Albert Berger, Ron Yerxa and Anthony Minghella	Nominated
61st Golden Globe Awards	Best Motion Picture – Drama	Cold Mountain	Nominated
61st Golden Globe Awards	Best Director	Anthony Minghella	Nominated
61st Golden Globe Awards	Best Actor in a Motion Picture – Drama	Jude Law	Nominated
61st Golden Globe Awards	Best Actress in a Motion Picture – Drama	Nicole Kidman	Nominated
61st Golden Globe Awards	Best Supporting Actress – Motion Picture	Renée Zellweger	Won
61st Golden Globe Awards	Best Screenplay	Anthony Minghella	Nominated
61st Golden Globe Awards	Best Original Score	Gabriel Yared	Nominated
61st Golden Globe Awards	Best Original Song	"You Will Be My Ain True Love"	Nominated
10th Screen Actors Guild Awards	Outstanding Performance by a Female Actor in a Supporting Role	Renée Zellweger	Won
9th Critics' Choice Awards	Best Picture	Cold Mountain	Nominated
9th Critics' Choice Awards	Best Actress	Nicole Kidman	Nominated
9th Critics' Choice Awards	Best Supporting Actress	Renée Zellweger	Won
9th Critics' Choice Awards	Best Score	Gabriel Yared	Nominated

== See also ==
- Captain Daniel Ellis

== Bibliography ==
- Tibbetts, John C., and James M. Welsh, eds. The Encyclopedia of Novels Into Film (2nd ed. 2005) pp. 63–66.
