= 18th Critics' Choice Awards =

2013 US film awards

- Date: January 10, 2013
- Hosted by: Sam Rubin
- Official website: www.criticschoice.com

Highlights
- Best Film: Argo
- Most awards: Silver Linings Playbook (4)
- Most nominations: Lincoln (13)

Television coverage
- Network: The CW

The 18th Critics' Choice Awards were presented on January 10, 2013 at the Barker Hangar at the Santa Monica Airport, honoring the finest achievements of 2012 filmmaking. The ceremony was broadcast on The CW and hosted by Sam Rubin. The nominees were announced on December 11, 2012.

== Winners and nominees ==
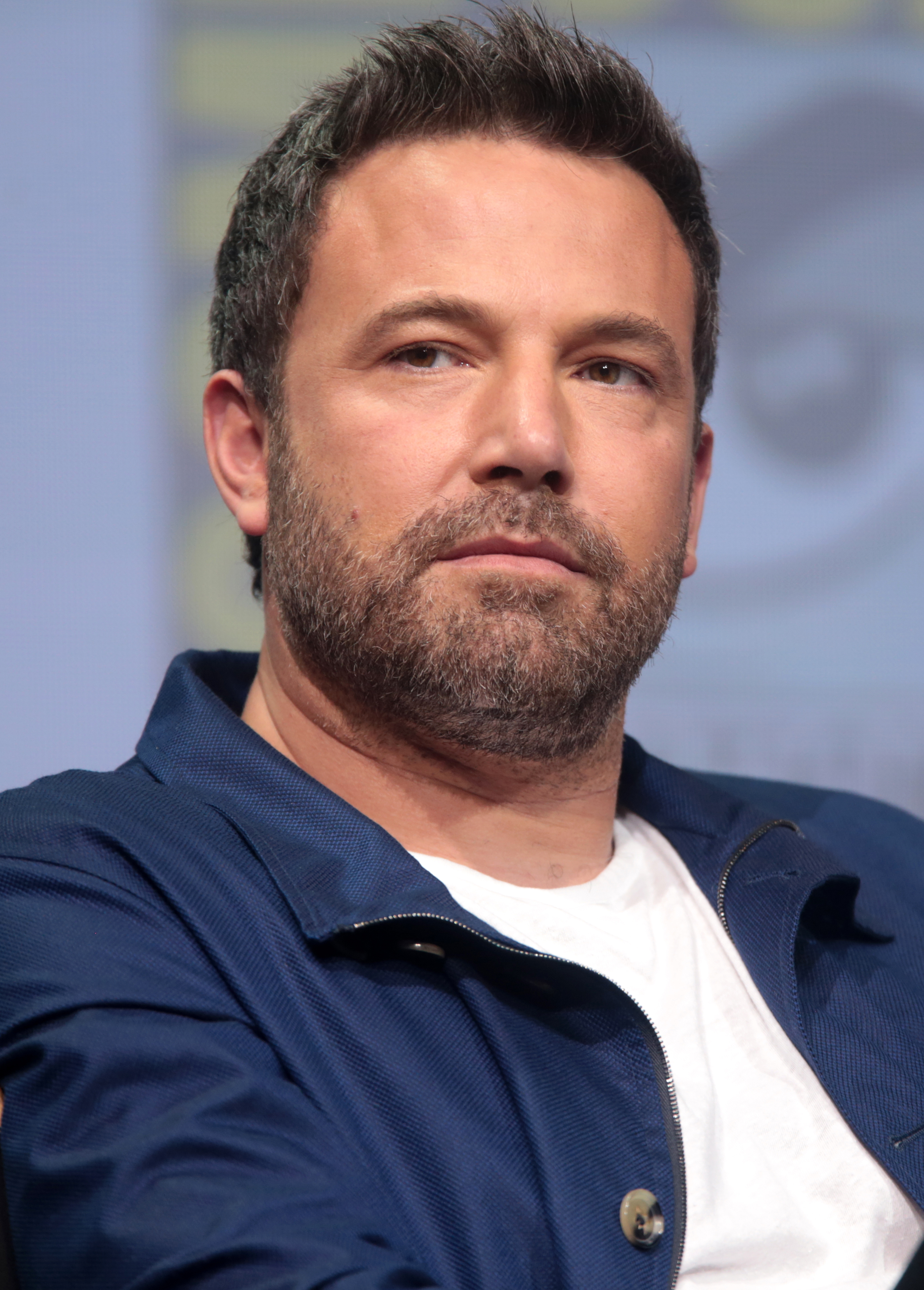
Ben Affleck, Best Director winner

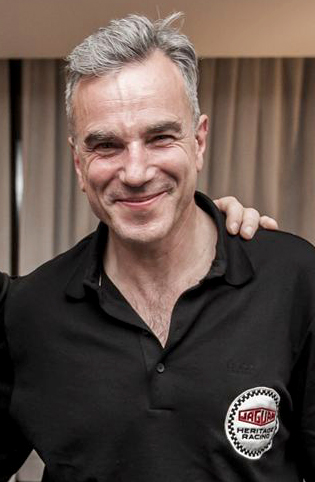
Daniel Day-Lewis, Best Actor winner

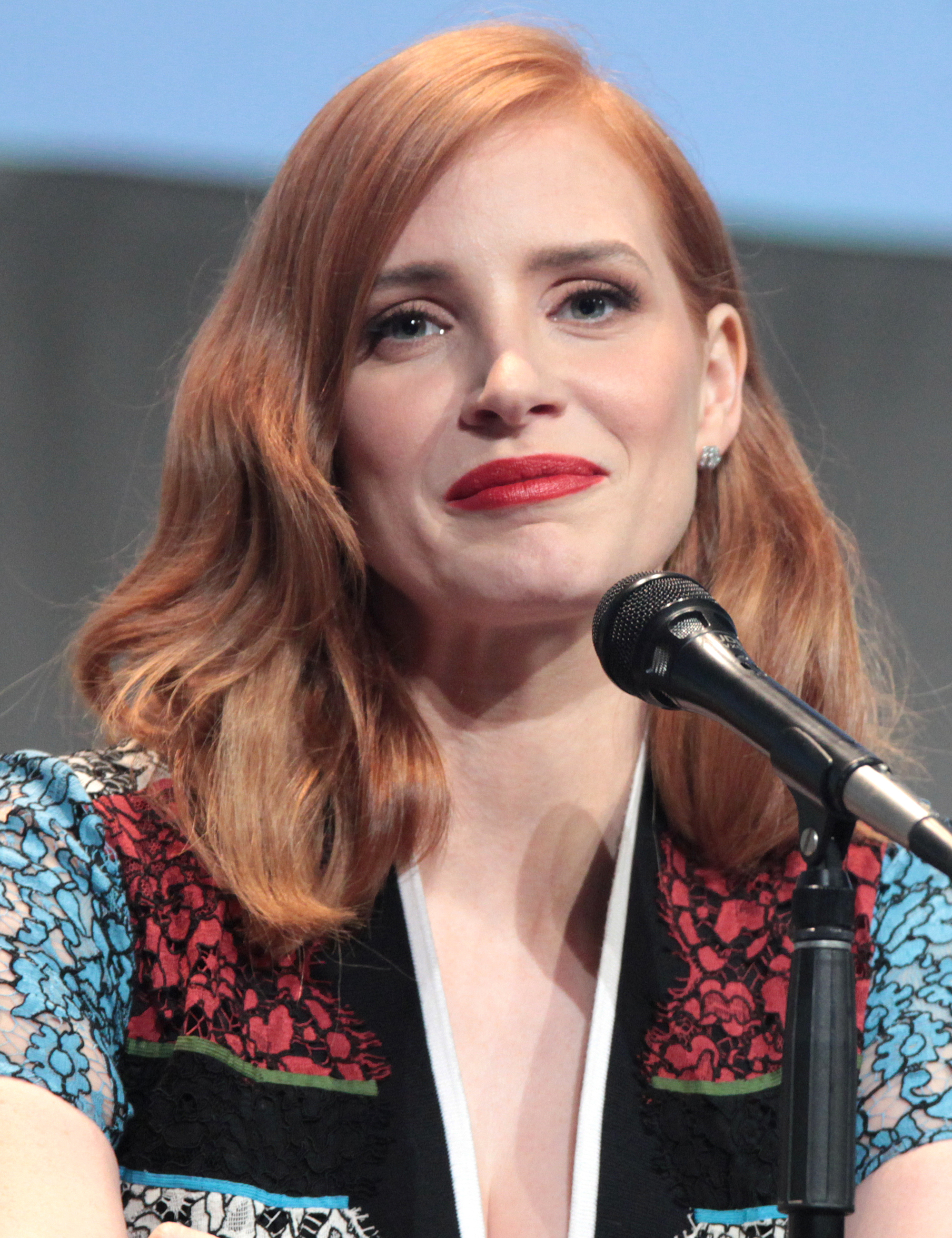
Jessica Chastain, Best Actress winner

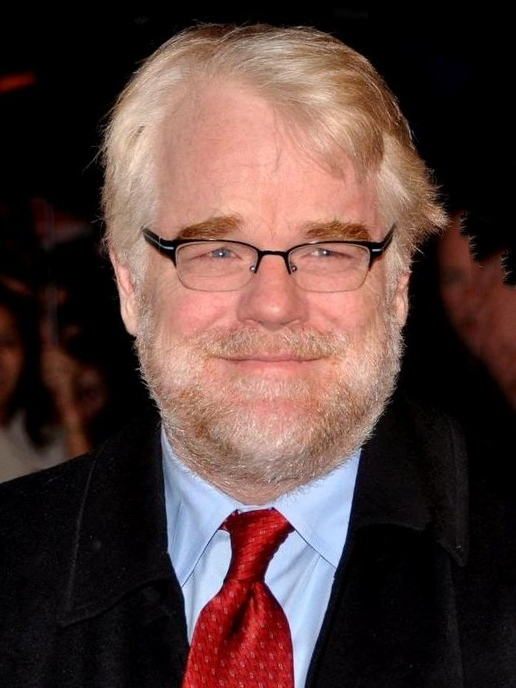
Philip Seymour Hoffman, Best Supporting Actor winner

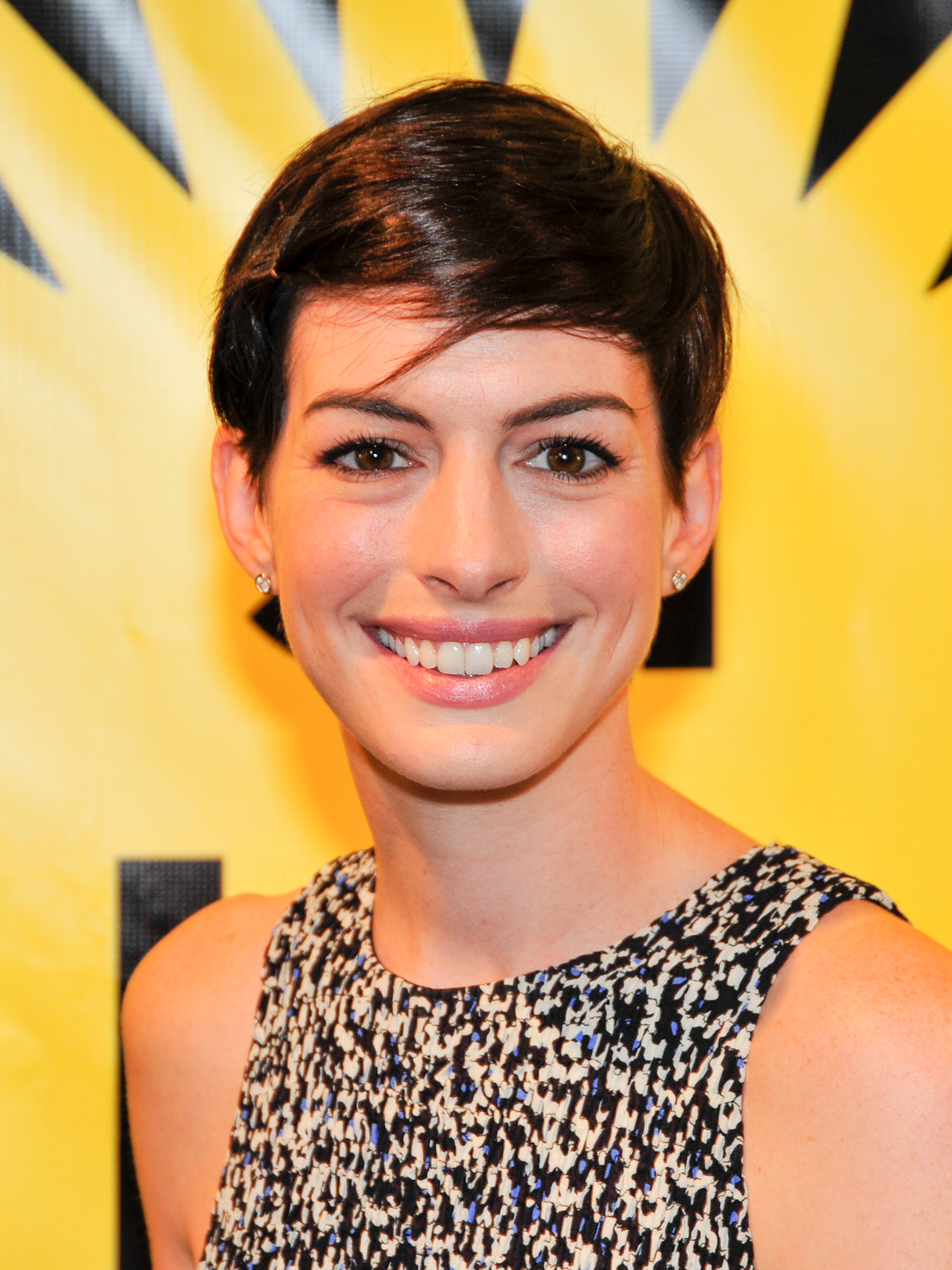
Anne Hathaway, Best Supporting Actress winner

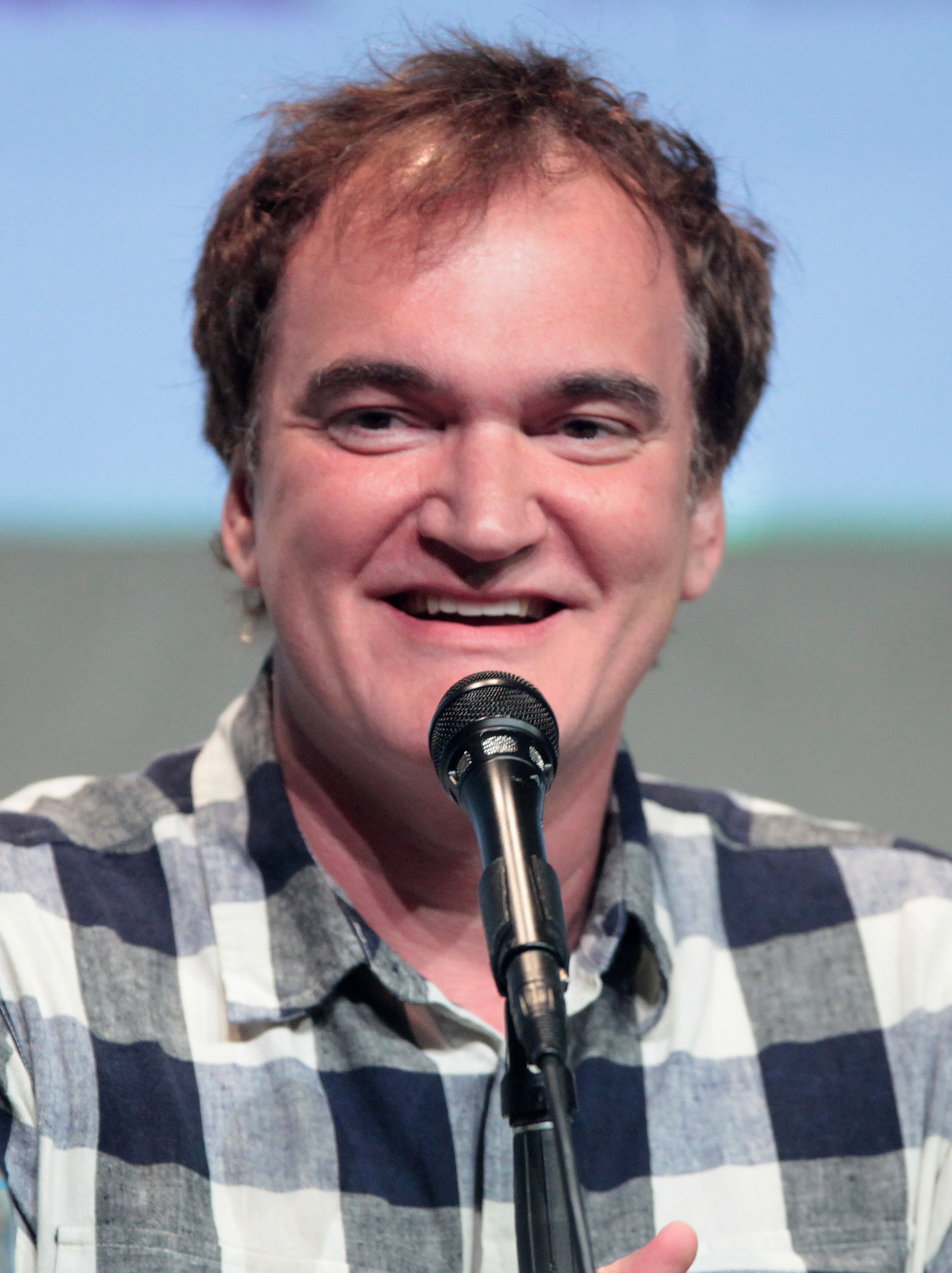
Quentin Tarantino, Best Original Screenplay winner

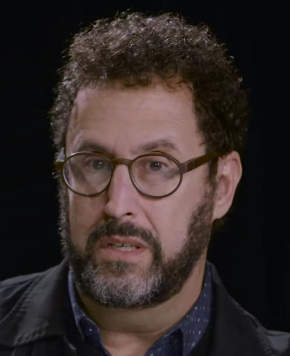
Tony Kushner, Best Adapted Screenplay winner

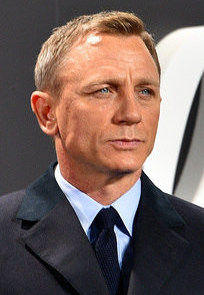
Daniel Craig, Best Actor in an Action Movie winner

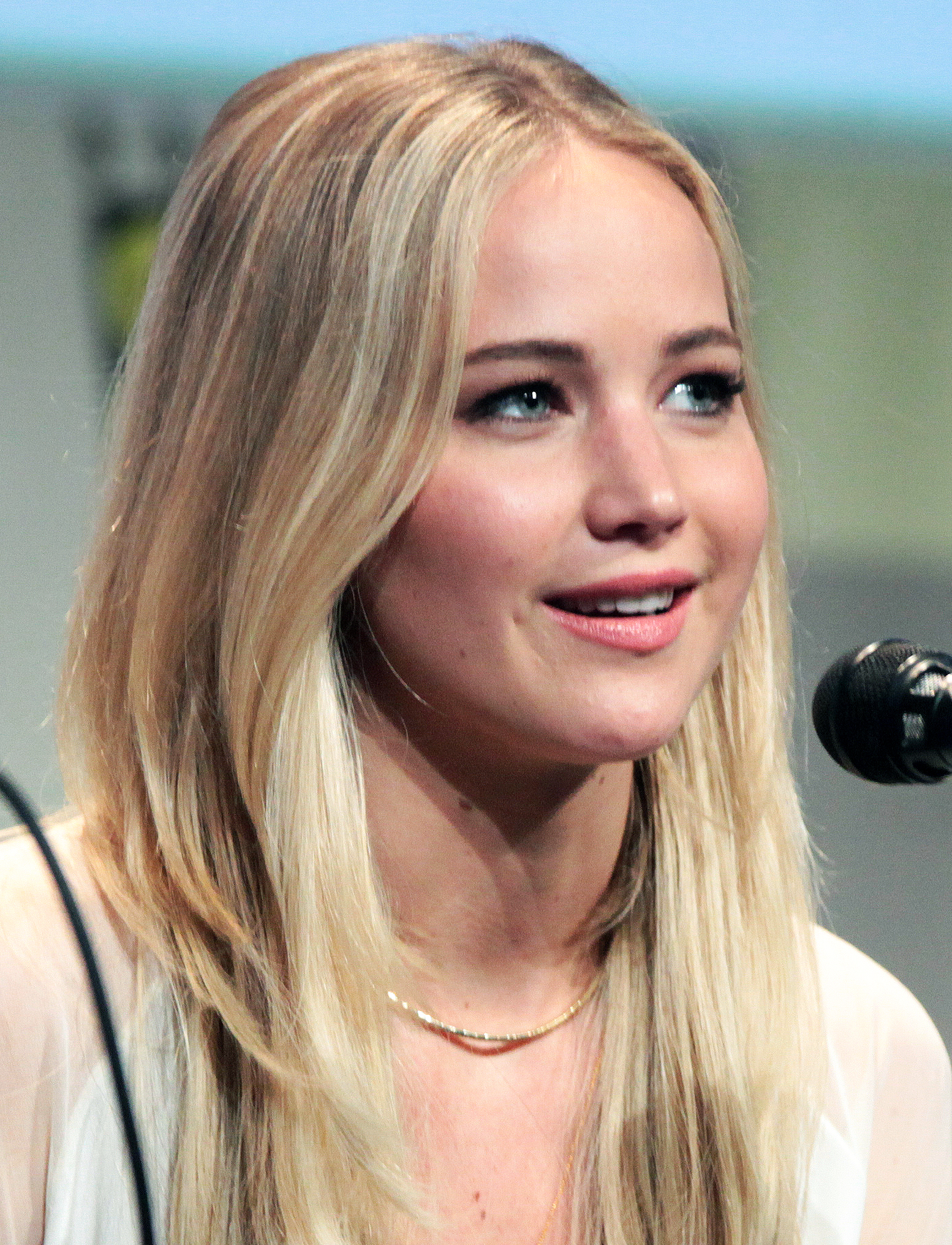
Jennifer Lawrence, Best Actress in an Action Movie and Best Actress in a Comedy Movie winner

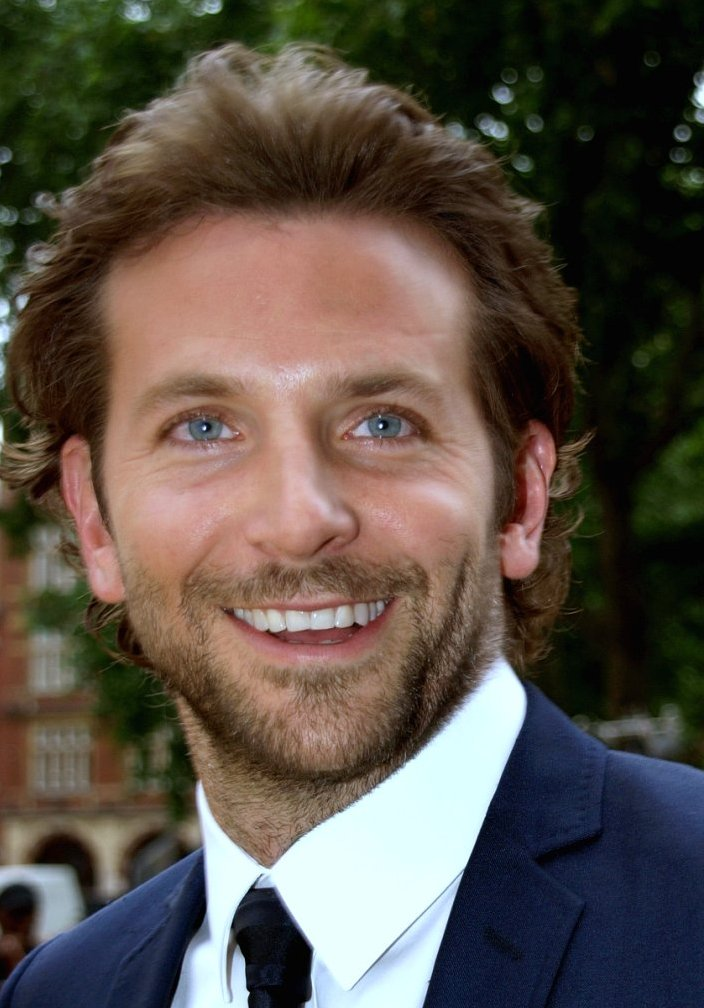
Bradley Cooper, Best Actor in a Comedy Movie winner

Best Picture Argo: Beasts of the Southern Wild; Django Unchained; Les Misérables; Life of Pi; Lincoln; The Master; Moonrise Kingdom; Silver Linings Playbook; Zero Dark Thirty	Best Director Ben Affleck – Argo: Kathryn Bigelow – Zero Dark Thirty; Tom Hooper – Les Misérables; Ang Lee – Life of Pi; David O. Russell – Silver Linings Playbook; Steven Spielberg – Lincoln
Best Actor Daniel Day-Lewis – Lincoln as Abraham Lincoln: Bradley Cooper – Silver Linings Playbook as Patrizio "Pat" Solitano Jr.; John Hawkes – The Sessions as Mark O'Brien; Hugh Jackman – Les Misérables as Jean Valjean; Joaquin Phoenix – The Master as Freddie Quell; Denzel Washington – Flight as William "Whip" Whitaker Sr.	Best Actress Jessica Chastain – Zero Dark Thirty as Maya Harris: Marion Cotillard – Rust and Bone as Stéphanie; Jennifer Lawrence – Silver Linings Playbook as Tiffany Maxwell; Emmanuelle Riva – Amour as Anne Laurent; Quvenzhané Wallis – Beasts of the Southern Wild as Hushpuppy; Naomi Watts – The Impossible as Maria Bennett
Best Supporting Actor Philip Seymour Hoffman – The Master as Lancaster Dodd: Alan Arkin – Argo as Lester Siegel; Javier Bardem – Skyfall as Raoul Silva; Robert De Niro – Silver Linings Playbook as Patrizio "Pat" Solitano Sr.; Tommy Lee Jones – Lincoln as Thaddeus Stevens; Matthew McConaughey – Magic Mike as Dallas	Best Supporting Actress Anne Hathaway – Les Misérables as Fantine: Amy Adams – The Master as Peggy Dodd; Judi Dench – Skyfall as M; Ann Dowd – Compliance as Sandra Frum; Sally Field – Lincoln as Mary Todd Lincoln; Helen Hunt – The Sessions as Cheryl Cohen-Greene
Best Young Actor/Actress Quvenzhané Wallis – Beasts of the Southern Wild as Hushpuppy: Elle Fanning – Ginger & Rosa as Ginger; Kara Hayward – Moonrise Kingdom as Suzy Bishop; Tom Holland – The Impossible as Lucas Bennett; Logan Lerman – The Perks of Being a Wallflower as Charlie Kelmeckis; Suraj Sharma – Life of Pi as Piscine "Pi" Patel	Best Acting Ensemble Silver Linings Playbook: Argo; The Best Exotic Marigold Hotel; Les Misérables; Lincoln; Moonrise Kingdom
Best Original Screenplay Django Unchained – Quentin Tarantino: Flight – John Gatins; Looper – Rian Johnson; The Master – Paul Thomas Anderson; Moonrise Kingdom – Wes Anderson and Roman Coppola; Zero Dark Thirty – Mark Boal	Best Adapted Screenplay Lincoln – Tony Kushner: Argo – Chris Terrio; Life of Pi – David Magee; The Perks of Being a Wallflower – Stephen Chbosky; Silver Linings Playbook – David O. Russell
Best Animated Feature Wreck-It Ralph: Brave; Frankenweenie; Madagascar 3: Europe's Most Wanted; ParaNorman; Rise of the Guardians	Best Action Movie Skyfall: The Avengers; The Dark Knight Rises; Looper
Best Actor in an Action Movie Daniel Craig – Skyfall as James Bond: Christian Bale – The Dark Knight Rises as Bruce Wayne / Batman; Robert Downey Jr. – The Avengers as Tony Stark / Iron Man; Joseph Gordon-Levitt – Looper as Joe; Jake Gyllenhaal – End of Watch as Officer Brian Taylor	Best Actress in an Action Movie Jennifer Lawrence – The Hunger Games as Katniss Everdeen: Emily Blunt – Looper as Sara; Gina Carano – Haywire as Mallory Kane; Judi Dench – Skyfall as M; Anne Hathaway – The Dark Knight Rises as Selina Kyle / Catwoman
Best Documentary Feature Searching for Sugar Man: Bully; The Central Park Five; The Imposter; The Queen of Versailles; West of Memphis	Best Comedy Movie Silver Linings Playbook: 21 Jump Street; Bernie; Ted; This Is 40
Best Actor in a Comedy Movie Bradley Cooper – Silver Linings Playbook as Patrizio "Pat" Solitano Jr.: Jack Black – Bernie as Bernie Tiede; Paul Rudd – This Is 40 as Pete; Channing Tatum – 21 Jump Street as Greg Jenko; Mark Wahlberg – Ted as John Bennett	Best Actress in a Comedy Movie Jennifer Lawrence – Silver Linings Playbook as Tiffany Maxwell: Mila Kunis – Ted as Lori Collins; Shirley MacLaine – Bernie as Marjorie Nugent; Leslie Mann – This Is 40 as Debbie; Rebel Wilson – Pitch Perfect as Patricia "Fat Amy" Hobart
Best Sci-Fi/Horror Movie Looper: The Cabin in the Woods; Prometheus	Best Foreign Language Film Amour • Austria / France / Germany: The Intouchables • France; A Royal Affair • Denmark; Rust and Bone • France
Best Art Direction Anna Karenina – Sarah Greenwood (Production Design) / Katie Spencer (Set Decoration): The Hobbit: An Unexpected Journey – Dan Hennah (Production Design) / Simon Bright and Ra Vincent (Set Decoration); Les Misérables – Eve Stewart (Production Design) / Anna Lynch-Robinson (Set Decoration); Life of Pi – David Gropman (Production Design) / Anna Pinnock (Set Decoration); Lincoln – Rick Carter (Production Design) / Jim Erickson (Set Decoration)	Best Cinematography Life of Pi – Claudio Miranda: Les Misérables – Danny Cohen; Lincoln – Janusz Kamiński; The Master – Mihai Mălaimare Jr.; Skyfall – Roger Deakins
Best Costume Design Anna Karenina – Jacqueline Durran: Cloud Atlas – Kym Barrett and Pierre-Yves Gayraud; The Hobbit: An Unexpected Journey – Bob Buck, Ann Maskrey, and Richard Taylor; Les Misérables – Paco Delgado; Lincoln – Joanna Johnston	Best Editing Zero Dark Thirty – William Goldenberg and Dylan Tichenor: Argo – William Goldenberg; Les Misérables – Chris Dickens and Melanie Oliver; Life of Pi – Tim Squyres; Lincoln – Michael Kahn
Best Score Lincoln – John Williams: Argo – Alexandre Desplat; Life of Pi – Mychael Danna; The Master – Jonny Greenwood; Moonrise Kingdom – Alexandre Desplat	Best Song "Skyfall" – Skyfall: "For You" – Act of Valor; "Learn Me Right" – Brave; "Still Alive" – Paul Williams Still Alive; "Suddenly" – Les Misérables
Best Makeup Cloud Atlas: The Hobbit: An Unexpected Journey; Les Misérables; Lincoln	Best Visual Effects Life of Pi: The Avengers; Cloud Atlas; The Dark Knight Rises; The Hobbit: An Unexpected Journey

=== Favorite Film Franchise ===
(Public voting category)

The Twilight Saga

- Batman
- Harry Potter
- Indiana Jones
- James Bond
- The Lord of the Rings
- Spider-Man
- Star Trek
- Star Wars
- Toy Story

=== Louis XIII Genius Award ===
Judd Apatow

== Statistics ==
Nominations	Film
13	Lincoln
11	Les Misérables
10	Silver Linings Playbook
9	Life of Pi
7	Argo
7	The Master
7	Skyfall
5	Looper
5	Moonrise Kingdom
5	Zero Dark Thirty
4	The Dark Knight Rises
4	The Hobbit: An Unexpected Journey
3	The Avengers
3	Beasts of the Southern Wild
3	Bernie
3	Cloud Atlas
3	Ted
3	This Is 40
2	21 Jump Street
2	Amour
2	Anna Karenina
2	Brave
2	Django Unchained
2	Flight
2	The Impossible
2	The Perks of Being a Wallflower
2	Rust and Bone
2	The Sessions

Wins	Film
4	Silver Linings Playbook
3	Lincoln
3	Skyfall
2	Anna Karenina
2	Argo
2	Life of Pi
2	Zero Dark Thirty
