= List of accolades received by King Kong (2005 film) =

King Kong accolades
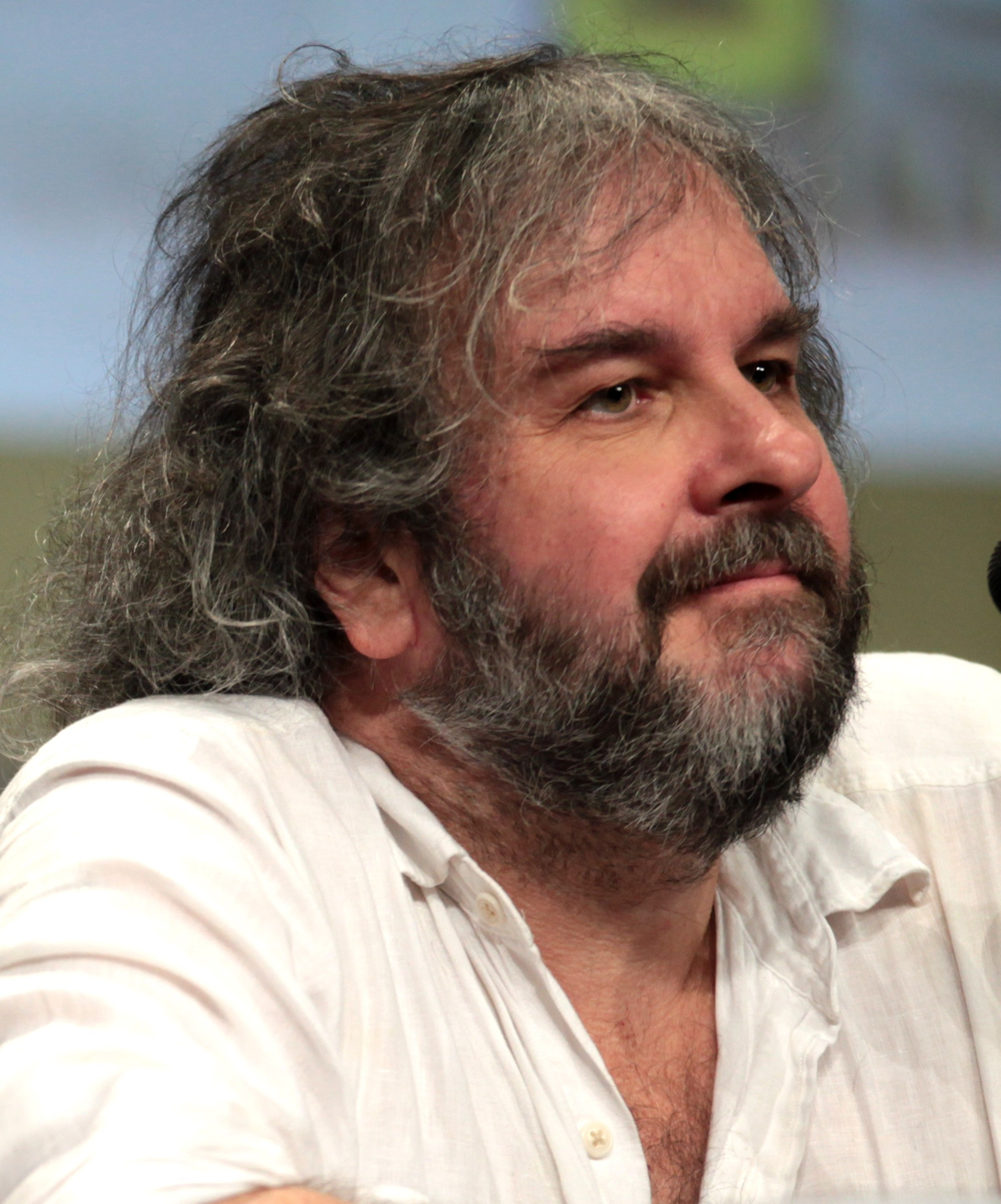
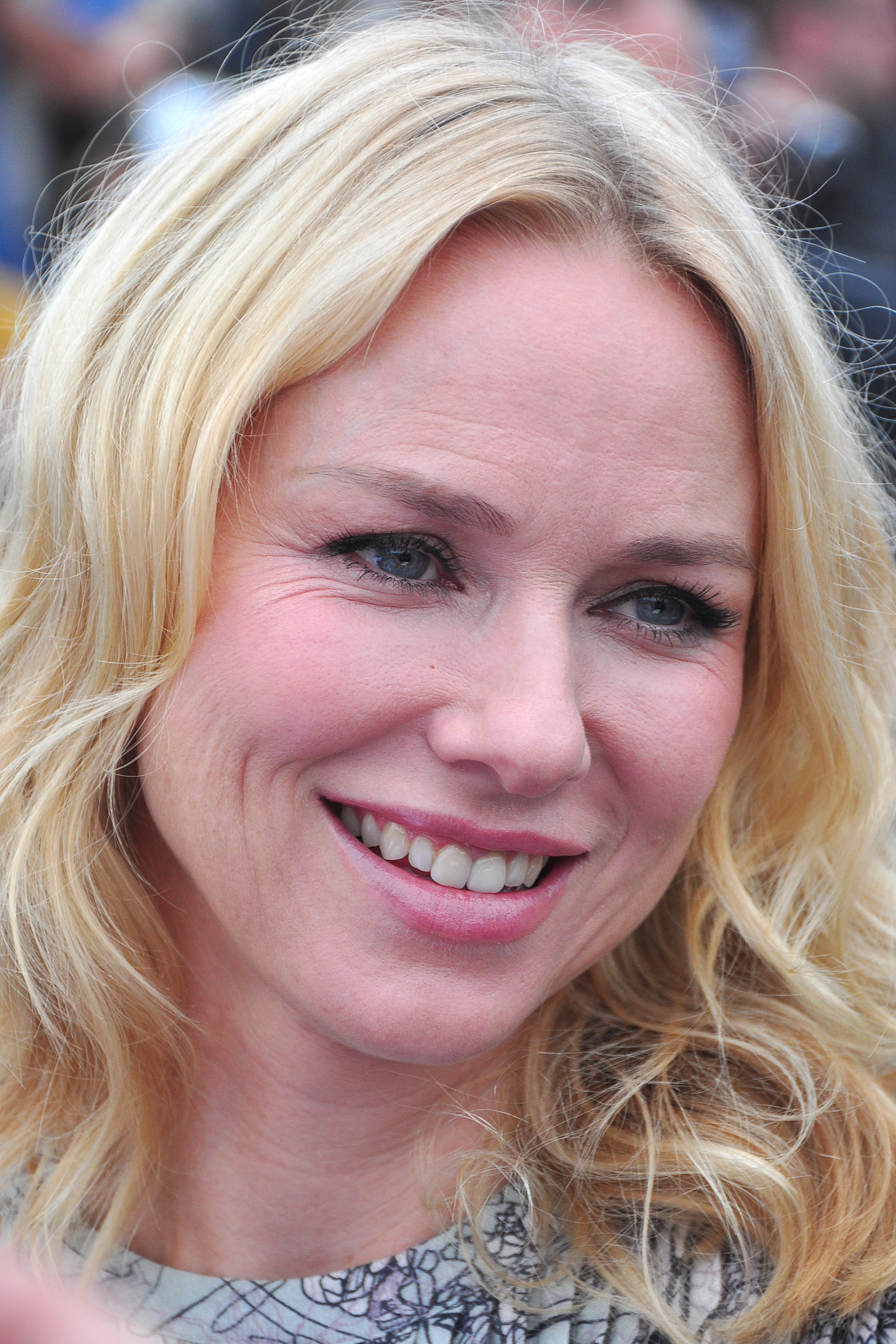
- Peter Jackson and Naomi Watts received multiple accolades for their work on King Kong
Awards and nominations
Award	Wins	Nominations

Totals (Note: Certain award groups do not simply award one winner. They acknowledge several different recipients, have runners-up, and have third place. Since this is a specific recognition and is different from losing an award, runner-up mentions are considered wins in this award tally. For simplification and to avoid errors, each award in this list has been presumed to have had a prior nomination.)
- Wins: 37
- Nominations: 75

King Kong is a 2005 epic adventure monster film co-written, produced, and directed by Peter Jackson. It is the ninth entry in the King Kong franchise and the second remake of the 1933 film of the same title, the first being the 1976 remake. The film stars Naomi Watts, Jack Black, and Adrien Brody. Set in 1933, it follows the story of an ambitious and unscrupulous filmmaker who tricks his cast and hired ship crew into travelling to mysterious Skull Island. There they encounter various prehistoric creatures and a legendary giant gorilla known as Kong, whom they capture and take to New York City.

The film garnered nominations in various categories, particularly for Jackson's direction, Best Visual Effects, Best Art Direction, as well as lead performance of Watts. It earned three Academy Awards for Best Sound Editing, Best Sound Mixing and Best Visual Effects.

== Accolades ==
Award	Subject	Nominee	Result	Refs
Academy Awards	Best Art Direction	Grant Major, Dan Hennah, and Simon Bright	Nominated	
Academy Awards	Best Sound Editing	Mike Hopkins and Ethan Van der Ryn	Won	
Academy Awards	Best Sound Mixing	Christopher Boyes, Michael Semanick, Michael Hedges, and Hammond Peek	Won	
Academy Awards	Best Visual Effects	Joe Letteri, Brian Van't Hul, Christian Rivers, and Richard Taylor	Won	
American Film Institute	Top Ten Films	King Kong	Won	
American Society of Cinematographers Award	Outstanding Achievement in Cinematography in Theatrical Releases	Andrew Lesnie	Nominated	
ASCAP Film and Television Music Awards	Top Box Office Films	James Newton Howard	Won	
Art Directors Guild	Excellence in Production Design for a Fantasy Film	Grant Major, Dan Hennah, Joe Bleakley, Simon Bright, Simon Harper, David A. Cook, and Jacqui Allen	Nominated	
British Academy Film Awards	Best Special Visual Effects	Joe Letteri, Brian Van't Hul, Christian Rivers, and Richard Taylor	Won	
British Academy Film Awards	Best Production Design	Grant Major	Nominated	
British Academy Film Awards	Best Sound	Hammond Peek, Christopher Boyes, Mike Hopkins, and Ethan Van der Ryn	Nominated	
Critics Choice Awards	Best Picture	King Kong	Nominated	
Critics Choice Awards	Best Director	Peter Jackson	Nominated	
Chicago Film Critics Association Awards	Best Director	Peter Jackson	Nominated	
Chicago Film Critics Association Awards	Best Actress	Naomi Watts	Nominated	
Chicago Film Critics Association Awards	Best Cinematography	Andrew Lesnie	Nominated	
Chicago Film Critics Association Awards	Best Original Score	James Newton Howard	Nominated	
Cinema Audio Society	Outstanding Achievement in Sound Mixing for a Motion Picture	Christopher Boyes, Michael Semanick, Michael Hedges, Hammond Peek	Nominated	
Dallas-Fort Worth Film Critics Association	Best Picture	King Kong	Nominated	
Dallas-Fort Worth Film Critics Association	Best Director	Peter Jackson	Nominated	
Empire Awards	Best Sci-Fi/Superhero	King Kong	Nominated	
Empire Awards	Best Director	Peter Jackson	Nominated	
Empire Awards	Best Actor	Andy Serkis	Nominated	
Empire Awards	Best Actress	Naomi Watts	Nominated	
Empire Awards	Best Film	King Kong	Won	
Georges Award	Best Blockbuster Movie	King Kong	Nominated	
Golden Globe Awards	Best Director	Peter Jackson	Nominated	
Golden Globe Awards	Best Original Score	James Newton Howard	Nominated	
Golden Reel Awards	Best Sound Editing in Feature Film - Foreign	Ethan Van der Ryn, Mike Hopkins, Brent Burge, David Farmer, Dave Whitehead, John Simpson, Hayden Collow, Melanie Graham, Matthew Lambourn, Justin Webster, Katy Wood, Peter Mills, Craig Tomlinson, Ray Beentjes, Jason Canovas, Martin Kwok, Polly McKinnon, Chris Ward, Jenny T. Ward, Robyn McFarlane, and Carolyn McLaughlin	Nominated	
Golden Reel Awards	Best Sound Editing in Feature Film - Foreign	Matt Stutter	Nominated	
Golden Reel Awards	Best Sound Editing in Feature Film - Music	Jim Weidman and Peter Myles	Nominated	
Golden Schmoes Awards	Best DVD/Blu-Ray of the Year	'Deluxe Edition'	Nominated	
Golden Schmoes Awards	Favorite Movie of the Year	King Kong	Nominated	
Golden Schmoes Awards	Best Director of the Year	Peter Jackson	Nominated	
Golden Schmoes Awards	Most Overrated Movie of the Year	King Kong	Nominated	
Golden Schmoes Awards	Best Special Effects of the Year	King Kong	Won	
Golden Schmoes Awards	Best Actress of the Year	Naomi Watts	Nominated	
Golden Schmoes Awards	Coolest Character of the Year	'Kong'	Nominated	
Golden Schmoes Awards	Best Music in a Movie	King Kong	Nominated	
Golden Schmoes Awards	Best Trailer of the Year	King Kong	Nominated	
Golden Schmoes Awards	Best Action Sequence of the Year	'Kong vs. T-Rexes'	Won	
Golden Schmoes Awards	Most Memorable Scene in a Movie	'Kong vs. T-Rexes'	Nominated	
Golden Schmoes Awards	Most Memorable Scene in a Movie	'Kong on top of the Empire State Building'	Nominated	
Hollywood Professional Association	Outstanding Color Grading Feature Film in a DI Process	David Cole	Nominated	
Hollywood Professional Association	Outstanding Compositing - Feature Film	Erik Winquist, Charles Tait, Johan Åberg, and G.G. Heitmann Demers	Nominated	
International Cinephile Society	Best Actress	Naomi Watts	Nominated	
International Cinephile Society	Best Production Design	Grant Major	2nd place	
International Film Music Critics Association	Film Score of the Year	James Newton Howard	Nominated	
International Film Music Critics Association	Best Original Score for an Action/Adventure Film	James Newton Howard	Nominated	
Jupiter Awards	Best International Director	Peter Jackson	Won	
Jupiter Awards	Best International Actress	Naomi Watts	Nominated	
Las Vegas Film Critics Society	Best Cinematography	Andrew Lesnie	Won	
Las Vegas Film Critics Society	Best Editing	Jamie Selkirk	Won	
Las Vegas Film Critics Society	Best Costume Design	Terry Ryan	Won	
Las Vegas Film Critics Society	Best Art Direction	Simon Bright and Dan Hennah	Won	
Las Vegas Film Critics Society	Best Visual Effects	King Kong	Won	
Las Vegas Film Critics Society	Best Picture	King Kong	3rd place	
London Critics Circle Film Awards	Film of the Year	King Kong	Nominated	
London Critics Circle Film Awards	Actress of the Year	Naomi Watts	Won	
London Critics Circle Film Awards	Director of the Year	Peter Jackson	Won	
MTV Russia Movie Awards	Best Foreign Movie	King Kong	Nominated	
MTV Movie & TV Awards	Best Movie	King Kong	Nominated	
MTV Movie & TV Awards	Best Fight	Kong vs the planes	Nominated	
National Board of Review	Special Achievement Award		Won	
Online Film Critics Society Awards	Best Director	Peter Jackson	Nominated	
Online Film Critics Society Awards	Best Actress	Naomi Watts	Nominated	
Online Film Critics Society Awards	Best Original Score	James Newton Howard	Nominated	
Online Film & Television Association	Best Actress	Naomi Watts	Nominated	
Online Film & Television Association	Best Music, Original Score	James Newton Howard	Nominated	
Online Film & Television Association	Best Cinematography	Andrew Lesnie	Nominated	
Online Film & Television Association	Best Production Design	Grant Major, Joe Bleakley, Simon Bright, and Dan Hennah	Won	
Online Film & Television Association	Best Costume Design	Terry Ryan	Nominated	
Online Film & Television Association	Best Makeup and Hairstyling	Gino Acevedo, Rick Findlater, Peter Swords King, Richard Taylor, Dominie Till	Nominated	
Online Film & Television Association	Best Sound Mixing	Christopher Boyes, Michael Semanick, Michael Hedges, and Hammond Peek	Won	
Online Film & Television Association	Best Sound Effects Editing	Mike Hopkins and Ethan Van der Ryn	Won	
Online Film & Television Association	Best Visual Effects	Joe Letteri, Brian Van't Hul, Christian Rivers, and Richard Taylor	Won	
Online Film & Television Association	Best Titles Sequence	King Kong	Nominated	
Online Film & Television Association	Best Cinematic Moment	T-Rex Fight	Nominated	
Online Film & Television Association	Best Official Film Website	King Kong	Nominated	
Phoenix Film Critics Society	Best Production Design	Grant Major	Won	
Phoenix Film Critics Society	Best Visual Effects	King Kong	Won	
Huabiao Award	Outstanding Translated Foreign Film	King Kong	Nominated	
Rondo Award	Best Film	King Kong	Won	
San Diego Film Critics Society Awards	Best Picture	King Kong	Won	
Saturn Award	Best DVD Special Edition Release	"Deluxe Extended Edition" release.	Nominated	
Saturn Award	Best Fantasy Film	King Kong	Nominated	
Saturn Award	Best Director	Peter Jackson	Won	
Saturn Award	Best Writing	Philippa Boyens, Fran Walsh, and Peter Jackson	Nominated	
Saturn Award	Best Actress	Naomi Watts	Won	
Saturn Award	Best Costume	Terry Ryan	Nominated	
Saturn Award	Best Make-Up	Richard Taylor, Gino Acevedo, Dominie Till, and Peter King	Nominated	
Saturn Award	Best Special Effects	Joe Letteri, Brian Van't Hul, Christian Rivers, and Richard Taylor	Won	
Scream Awards	Best Remake	King Kong	Won	
Scream Awards	Scream Queen	Naomi Watts	Nominated	
Scream Awards	Best Fantasy Movie	King Kong	Nominated	
Scream Awards	Best F/X	King Kong	Nominated	
Southeastern Film Critics Association	Best Picture	King Kong	9th place	
Stinkers Bad Movie Awards	Most Intrusive Musical Score	James Newton Howard	Nominated	
Stinkers Bad Movie Awards	Most Overrated Film	King Kong	Nominated	
St. Louis Film Critics Association	Best Director	Peter Jackson	Nominated	
St. Louis Film Critics Association	Best Cinematography or Visual/Special Effects	Joe Letteri, Brian Van't Hul, Christian Rivers, and Richard Taylor	Won	
Teen Choice Awards	Choice Action Adventure	King Kong	Nominated	
Teen Choice Awards	Choice Rumble	King Kong vs. T-Rex	Nominated	
Teen Choice Awards	Choice Sleazebag	Jack Black	Nominated	
Teen Choice Awards	Choice Hissy Fit	King Kong	Nominated	
Toronto Film Critics Association	Special Citation	Andy Serkis	Won	
Visual Effects Society	Outstanding Visual Effects in an Effects Driven Motion Picture	Joe Letteri, Eileen Moran, Christian Rivers, and Eric Saindon	Won	
Visual Effects Society	Outstanding Performance by an Animated; Character in a Live Action Motion Picture	Andy Serkis, Christian Rivers, Atsushi Sato, and Guy Williams	Won	
Visual Effects Society	Outstanding Created Environment in a Live Action Motion Picture	Dan Lemmon, R. Christopher White, Matt Aitken, and Charles Tait	Won	
Visual Effects Society	Outstanding Compositing in a Motion Picture	Erik Winquist, Michael Pangrazio, Steve Cronin, and Suzanne Jandu	Nominated	
World Soundtrack Awards	Soundtrack Composer of the Year	James Newton Howard	Nominated	
World Soundtrack Awards	Best Original Soundtrack of the Year	James Newton Howard	Nominated	
Vancouver Film Critics Circle	Best Actress	Naomi Watts	Nominated	
