= Stealing the Wave =

2007 book by Andy Martin

Stealing the Wave

Stealing the Wave: The Epic Struggle Between Ken Bradshaw and Mark Foo (ISBN 1596913800) is a book written by Andy Martin and published by Bloomsbury Publishing in 2007 (ISBN 0-7475-8226-2). It tells the story of surfers Mark Foo and Ken Bradshaw battling for supremacy at Waimea Bay, on the North Shore of Hawaii, where some of the biggest waves in the world crash onto the shore.

== Reviews ==
- The Guardian
- The Scotsman
- The Times
