= Mark Foo =

Singapore-born Hawaiian professional surfer

Personal information
- Born: February 5, 1958 Singapore
- Died: December 23, 1994 (aged 36) Mavericks, Half Moon Bay, California, USA

Surfing career
- Sport: Surfing

Surfing specifications
- Stance: Regular (natural foot)
- Favorite waves: North Shore (Oahu)

Mark Sheldon Foo was a professional surfer who favored big wave surfing. Foo drowned while surfing at Mavericks, Half Moon Bay, California, in 1994.

== Early life ==
Mark Foo was born in Singapore on February 5, 1958, to Colonel Charlie and Lorna Foo, Chinese photojournalists for the United States Information Agency. The family relocated to Hawaii when Foo was 10. He spent his early childhood surfing the South Shore of O'ahu, and continued surfing throughout his teenage years. His family moved several times during his adolescence but ultimately returned to Hawaii just before Foo finished high school. He graduated from President Theodore Roosevelt High School in 1975. He studied for two years at the University of Hawaiʻi.

== Career ==
In 1977, Foo joined the IPS World Tour, a professional surfing tour. In the early 1980s, Foo quit the IPS World Tour and stopped competing. Foo's passion for surfing big waves led him to surf larger and larger swells. In 1983, he surfed Waimea Bay, a famous big-wave surfing spot on the North Shore of O'ahu, for the first time.

But it was on January 18, 1986, when he ventured out into the bay with waves that onlookers said were in excess of 60 feet, that he rose to fame. When Foo fell off the overhanging ledge, the crashing wave broke his surfboard and tossed him into the water. Foo had to be rescued by a nearby helicopter, yet he emerged from the crash unharmed. He sent the story to various surfing magazines, but failed in the attempt to raise his surfing status to that of a "demigod."

== Death at Mavericks ==
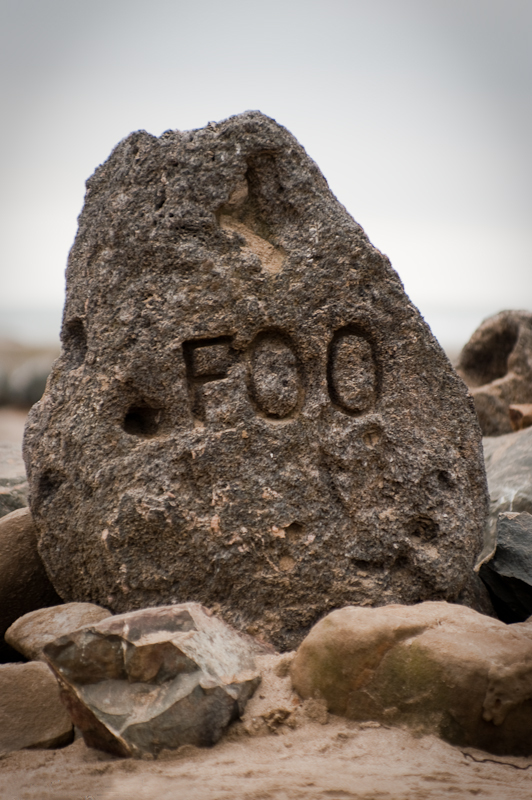
Memorial to Mark Foo at Mavericks Point on the Northern California Coast

On December 23, 1994, Foo died in a surfing accident at Mavericks, a big-wave surf location in Half Moon Bay, Northern California. Surfer magazine wrote that Foo was sleep-deprived after arriving in California on an overnight flight for the swell. During takeoff on a wave estimated at 18–20 feet (Hawaiian scale), Foo experienced a seemingly innocuous wipeout and drowned. The fateful wipeout was photographed from at least two angles, and shows him falling forward near the bottom of the wave.

The most popular presumption is that Foo's surf leash had become entangled on the rocks, with the rushing currents of a second wave passing overhead preventing him from disengaging his ankle strap and getting to the surface. This theory was further validated when professional surfer Mike Parsons, who wiped out on the following wave, said that he came into contact with something, possibly Foo, as he was tumbled around underwater. Foo's body was discovered still tied to the broken tail section of his board inside Pillar Point lagoon over two hours later. The coroner's report cited "salt-water drowning" and "blunt head trauma" as his causes of death.

Foo's death shook the big-wave surfing community. On December 30, over 700 people arrived at Waimea Bay for his funeral. Approximately 150 surfers paddled into and formed a large circle. One of the participants, who was carrying a container with Foo's ashes, paddled into the center of the circle and placed the ashes into the ocean. A segment of the film Riding Giants documented Foo's death at Mavericks.

== Legacy ==
Foo founded a hostel, Backpackers Hawaii, in Pupukea. The hostel's website maintains an online memorial for him.

Foo helped elevate the popularity of the sport, with his talent, courage, and enthusiasm, and was recognized as one of the greatest big-wave surfers of all time. Mark was a favorite subject of photographers, and he had his own cable television surfing program. "If you want to ride the ultimate wave, you have to be willing to pay the ultimate price" was Foo's philosophy.

In the realm of big-wave surfing, Foo's death brought about a continuing discourse regarding the safe use of surfboard leashes, or flexible cords that connect the surfboard to a belt on the surfers ankle. Proponents defend the leash as a useful convenience and insurance against losing the surfboard, which serves as flotation device in the case of a "wipe out." They also assert that the leash is a means for a fallen surfer to find his way to surface air by following the leash cord to the floating surfboard on the water's surface.

There are also surfers who believe that Foo's surfboard leash may have caused or contributed to his death. Opponents of leashes in big surf assert that a leash can cause the surfer to collide with the board in a wipe out, potentially causing head injuries, and that the leash can also loop around the arms, legs, or neck, dangerously restricting escape to safety or strangling the surfer. Quick-release Velcro leashes have since become standard surfing equipment to address some of these dangers. The debates continue to this day.

American rock band Seventeen (later known as Lustra) performed a musical tribute (misspelled as "Mark Fu") on their 2000 LP Bikini Pie Fight!.

== Stealing the Wave ==
The competition between Foo and Ken Bradshaw in the 1980s is chronicled in Stealing the Wave by Andy Martin.

== See also ==
- Eddie Aikau
- North Shore (movie appearance as a surfer)
