= North Shore (1987 film) =

1987 film by William Phelps

- Theatrical release poster
- Directed by: William Phelps
- Screenplay by: Tim McCanlies; William Phelps
- Story by: William Phelps; Randal Kleiser
- Produced by: William Finnegan
- Starring: Matt Adler; Nia Peeples; John Philbin; Gerry Lopez; Gregory Harrison
- Cinematography: Peter Smokler
- Edited by: Robert Gordon
- Music by: Richard Stone
- Production company: Finnegan/Pinchuk Productions
- Distributed by: Universal Pictures
- Release date: August 14, 1987
- Running time: 96 minutes
- Country: United States
- Language: English
- Box office: $3,832,228

North Shore is a 1987 American action drama surf film directed by William Phelps. The film is about Rick Kane (Matt Adler), a young surfer from a wave tank in Arizona, who heads to surf the season on the North Shore of Oʻahu to see if he has the skills to cut it as a pro surfer. As he progresses on his journey, he learns the qualities he possesses are not going to pull him through alone.

== Plot ==
Eighteen year-old Rick Kane has just graduated from high school. He uses his winnings from a wave tank surfing contest in his native state of Arizona to fly to Hawaii for the summer before the start of college, in order to try to become a professional surfer. He takes a plane to Honolulu with plans to stay with a surfer that he met in Arizona six months previously. He finds the friend tending bar at a seedy gentlemen's club.

At the bar Rick meets up with two pro surfers, Alex (Robbie Page) and Mark (Mark Occhilupo), and stays with them at the house of Lance Burkhart. In the morning, he goes out surfing with Alex and Mark and realizes that surfing in the ocean is totally different to surfing in a wave tank. He is not as good as he had initially thought. They end up at Sunset Beach and tries to paddle out, not knowing how to duck dive he struggles his way out to the line-up. During this scene he gets in the way of Vince Moaloka (Gerry Lopez), who is leader of a local group named "The Hui" ("The Club"). This causes Vince to wipe out and leads to a confrontation where Rick is chased off the beach, after he realizes his stuff was stolen from the beach by another member of the Hui.

With nowhere to go, he fortuitously runs into Turtle (John Philbin). Kane also meets and falls in love with Kiani (Nia Peeples), a beautiful local girl, coincidentally the cousin of Vince, who helps him acclimate to the local culture and customs. Turtle introduces him to Chandler (Gregory Harrison), a surfboard shaper and soul surfer, who teaches Rick about soul surfing and Rick masters the art of appreciating and riding the waves. During Rick's stay, Chandler is marveled at Rick's talent for art and he then designs a new graphic for Chandler.

The film's antagonist is Lance Burkhart (Laird Hamilton), a famous, top-ranked surfer whose competitive and materialistic values ("Give me a Board that works. My Board") conflict with the spiritual teachings of Chandler ("You still have a single-fin-mentality"). The film climaxes with a surf contest on the Banzai Pipeline as Rick ends up competing against Lance in a duel of skills and beliefs. During the final round, Lance cheats by pulling on Rick's leash, causing him to wipeout. Chandler, initially hostile towards competitive surfing, is outraged, but Rick reminds him that it wasn't about winning, but going the distance.

As Rick prepares to leave for college in New York, he thanks Chandler for his friendship and lessons. While waiting for his flight, Rick is greeted by Turtle and Kiani. He shares a goodbye kiss with Kiani, and Turtle shows Rick a newspaper catching Lance in the act, who was disqualified. Rick promises to come back to the North Shore.

== Cast ==
- Matt Adler as Rick Kane
- Gregory Harrison as Chandler
- Nia Peeples as Kiani
- John Philbin as Turtle
- Gerry Lopez as Vince Moaloka
- Laird Hamilton as Lance Burkhart
- Robbie Page as Alex Rogers
- Mark Occhilupo as Occy
- John Paragon as Professor
- Cristina Raines as Mrs. Kane
- Corky Carroll as himself
- Lord James Blears as Contest Director
- Jim Trenton as Chuck King
- Allan Cole as Ed Lusky
- Shaun Tomson as himself
- Hans Hedemann as himself
- Derek Ho as himself
- Mark Foo as himself
- Ken Bradshaw as Surfer
- Michael Ho as Surfer
- Christian Fletcher as Surfer
- Jimmy Star as Surfer

== Production ==
North Shore features professional surfers Shaun Tomson, Gerry Lopez ("Vince"), Laird Hamilton ("Lance Burkhart"), Mark Occhilupo, Robbie Page ("Alex Rogers"), Mark Foo, Derek Ho, Hans Hedemann, Ken Bradshaw, Christian Fletcher, Lord James Blears and several others. The character of Rick Kane was loosely based on Connecticut born surfer Benjamin "Barney" Partyka. The first-ever professional surfer, Corky Carroll, plays a competition announcer in the film.

Laird Hamilton's adoptive father Bill Hamilton was a surfboard shaper and glasser on Oahu in the 1960s and 1970s and owned a small business. Bill was handmaking custom, high-performance surfboards for the Oahu North Shore big wave riders of the era, similar to the character Chandler in the film. In reality, Laird is a big wave rider and loathes competition like the Chandler character does.

== Legacy ==
The 2007 animated film Surf's Up parodies much of the plot and characters in North Shore.
