= John Philbin =

American actor (born 1960)

- Born: April 27, 1960 (age 66); Carmel, California, United States
- Occupation: Actor
- Years active: 1984–present

John Philbin (born April 27, 1960) is an American actor who is best known for his appearances in the films Children of the Corn, North Shore, Return of the Living Dead, Point Break and Tombstone.

== Early life ==
Philbin began surfing at 12. He studied acting at the University of California, Santa Barbara, as well as being on the university's surf team.

== Career ==
An accomplished surfer, Philbin has used this skill in films such as Point Break, The Boost, and North Shore. Some of his other films include Children of the Corn and The Return of the Living Dead.

=== Surfing instruction ===
Philbin gives surf training to actors to prepare them for film roles, one of the most notable being the surf instructor for actors in the film Blue Crush.

== Personal life ==
=== 2015 arrest ===
Philbin was arrested on February 28, 2015, after he brandished a loaded gun at his girlfriend. He pleaded no contest to a misdemeanor weapons charge and was sentenced to 30 days in county jail (credited with 26 days), plus 3 years' probation and complete a 52-week AA program and domestic violence classes.

== Filmography ==
Year	Title	Role	Notes
1984	Children Of The Corn	Amos	
1984	Grandview, U.S.A.	Cowboy	
1985	The New Kids	Gideon	
1985	Not My Kid	Brian	
1985	The Return of the Living Dead	Chuck	
1987	Shy People	Tommy	
1987	North Shore	Turtle	
1987	Under Cover	Officer Vic Fieldson	
1988	The Boost	Tim	Uncredited
1988	Honor Bound	Sergeant Max Young	
1989	Martians Go Home	Donny	
1991	Point Break	Nathanial	
1993	Tombstone	Tom McLaury	
1994	The Crew	Alex	
1996	Blossom Time	Arthur Steele	
1997	The Killing Jar	Pete Lawrence	
1997	Levitation	The Police Officer	
1997	Moonbase	Lucas	
1998	Girl	Mr. Jones	
2001	The Edge of the Midway	Dan	
2001	Perfect Fit	Monty	
2002	Blue Crush		
2007	Zombie Farm	Agent Richardson	
2011	Soul Surfer	Fuel TV Reporter #2	
2013	The Perfect House	Jeff	
2015	Bikini Inception		
2015	Ovation		
2026	Büyü 3: Son Ayin		
