= The New Kids =

1985 American teen thriller film

- Theatrical release poster
- Directed by: Sean S. Cunningham
- Written by: Stephen Gyllenhaal; Brian Taggert
- Produced by: Sean S. Cunningham; Barbara De Fina; Andrew Fogelson
- Starring: Shannon Presby; Lori Loughlin; James Spader; John Philbin; Eddie Jones; Eric Stoltz; Tom Atkins
- Cinematography: Steven Poster
- Music by: Michel Rubini; Lalo Schifrin
- Distributed by: Columbia Pictures
- Release date: January 18, 1985
- Running time: 89 minutes
- Country: United States
- Language: English
- Budget: $6 million
- Box office: $199,108

The New Kids is a 1985 American teen thriller film directed by Sean S. Cunningham and starring Shannon Presby, Lori Loughlin and James Spader. The film was released on January 18, 1985, by Columbia Pictures.

== Plot ==
When Abby and Loren McWilliams' parents John and Mary Beth are killed in an accident, they are sent to live with their uncle Charlie and aunt Fay in the small town of Glenby, Florida. Charlie and Fay own a small amusement park with an attached gas station.

Loren and Abby do not have much trouble making friends at their new school; Loren starts dating local sheriff's daughter Karen Goodsell, while Abby begins seeing a guy named Mark. The brother and sister settle into their new life, helping Charlie renovate the amusement park. However, trouble arises when Loren sees a guy harassing Abby in the cafeteria at school. Mark tells Loren and Abby that the thug is Eddie Dutra, a drug-addicted teenager who heads a gang as bad as he is, with Gideon Walters, Moonie, Gordo and Joe Bob.

Dutra finds Abby attractive, and competes with Gideon as both try to seduce her. Abby finds both of them repugnant. Loren helps his sister fend off their advances, growing into a feud between the siblings and Dutra and his gang. The gang retaliates against Loren and Abby with escalating violence and cruelty. Eventually, Dutra and his gang kidnap Abby from an afterschool dance at night, and take her back to the amusement park, intending to rape her.

The gang takes Charlie hostage as well, and Dutra threatens him to force Abby's compliance. Charlie fights back and Gordo ends up killed by the gang's own dog. Dutra shoots and severely injures Charlie, then kills the dog, while Abby escapes into the park. Dutra turns on the power to the park, activating the lights and all the rides. Loren arrives and uses his knowledge of the park to take on the remaining gang one by one. He causes Moonie to be thrown to his death from the Ferris wheel, then electrocutes Joe Bob atop the bumper car. In a fistfight, Loren throws Gideon on the tracks of the roller coaster in time for the cars to decapitate the horrid, vicious thug.

Dutra chases Abby into the parking lot of the gas station. He grabs a nozzle from one of the gas pumps and lights the stream of gas like a flame thrower. Loren arrives and struggles with Dutra over the nozzle. Loren forces the flame into Dutra's face, setting the fiend on fire and killing him.

Charlie survives his injuries. The park renovations are completed and it reopens. Charlie capitalizes on the notoriety of the crimes to attract more visitors and the business is thriving. As Abby, Loren and Karen drive away to enjoy the day, Joe Bob's little brother Chad Bob stares after them with hate in his eyes.

== Cast ==
- Shannon Presby as Loren McWilliams
- Lori Loughlin as Abby McWilliams
- James Spader as Eddie Dutra
- John Philbin as Gideon
- Eric Stoltz as Mark
- Tom Atkins as United States Army Colonel John "Mac" MacWilliams
- Vincent Grant as Joe Bob
- David H. MacDonald as Moonie
- Paige Lyn Price as Karen
- Court Miller as Sheriff
- Jean DeBaer as Mary Beth McWilliams
- Lucy Martin as Aunt Fay
- Theron Montgomery as Gordon "Gordo"
- Eddie Jones as Charlie

== Production ==
Filming took place in Homestead, Florida.

Writer Harry Crews scripted the original draft of the film, but was not pleased with the finished product. His name does not appear in the credits, which attribute the story and screenplay to Stephen Gyllenhaal and Brian Taggert.

== Critical reception ==
AllMovie's review of the film was generally unfavorable. The film holds a 40% rating on Rotten Tomatoes based on five reviews.
