= Matt Adler =

American actor (born 1966)

- Born: Matthew D. Adler; December 8, 1966 (age 59); Los Angeles, California, U.S.
- Education: Lee Strasberg Theatre Institute
- Occupation: Actor
- Years active: 1984–present
- Spouses: Ria Pavia (m. 1993; div. 1995); Laura San Giacomo (m. 2000)

Matthew D. Adler (born December 8, 1966) is an American actor. He is best known for his supporting roles in the 1980s teenage films: Teen Wolf, White Water Summer, and Dream a Little Dream. He starred in North Shore. He currently works on additional dialogue recording for feature films.

In 1986, he auditioned for the role of "Bill S. Preston Esquire" in Bill & Ted's Excellent Adventure, being one of the final picks along with Keanu Reeves, Donovan Leitch, and Gary Riley. The role ultimately went to Alex Winter, who had initially auditioned for the part of Ted "Theodore" Logan.

== Early life ==
Adler was born in California and he has one brother. He struggled with alcohol and drug addiction as a teenager, and got sober at 17. He studied acting at the Lee Strasberg Theatre Institute and performed in 10 plays before appearance in a TV movie at age 18.

== Film and television credits ==
Year(s)	Title	Role	Notes
1984	Shattered Vows	Pat	TV movie
1985	Trapper John, M.D.	Brian Christopher	TV episode: "In the Eyes of the Beholder"
1985	Teen Wolf	Lewis	Film
1986	Carly Mills	Pete Mills	TV short
1986	Flight of the Navigator	Jeff (16 years old)	Film
1987	White Water Summer	Chris	Film
1987	North Shore	Rick Kane	Film
1987	Amazon Women on the Moon	George	Film (Segment "Titan Man")
1988	Doin' Time on Planet Earth	Dan Forrester	Film
1988	My Neighbor Totoro	Additional Voices	Film; 2005 Disney dub
1989	Nowhere to Run	Don	Film
1989	Dream a Little Dream	Dumas	Film
1990	Diving In	Wayne Hopkins	Film
1990	ABC Afterschool Specials	Jay Watson	Short film: "Testing Dirty" (as an ill-fated addict)
1993	Canceled Lives: Letters from the Inside	Himself (voice)	Video documentary
1993	Young Goodman Brown	William Stacey	Film
1994	Teresa's Tattoo	Titus	Film
1994	The Crow	Additional voice (voice)	Film
1997	Quiet Days in Hollywood	Amos	Film
1997	The Peacemaker	Alan	Film
1999	Kilroy	Bar Guy	TV movie
2000	It's a Shame About Ray	Mr. Springsteen	Film short
2000	Fail Safe	(voice)	TV movie
2000	Dinosaur	Additional Voices (voice)	Film
2001	Hollywood Palms	Matt	Film
2001	Final Fantasy: The Spirits Within	Additional voices (voice)	Film
2003–2004	Life with Bonnie	Garrett/Rod	TV episodes: "Ding, Ding, Ding Went the Truth" (2003) (Rod) "Don't Stress, Express" (2004) (Garrett)
2004	The Day After Tomorrow	Truck Radio Announcer	Film
2005	Unscripted	Himself	TV episode: #1.2
2006–2007	Shaggy & Scooby-Doo Get a Clue!	(voice)	TV episodes: "Inside Job" (2006) "Almost Ghosts" (2007)
2009	Smallville	Lex Luthor (voice)	TV episode: "Requiem"
2009	Ice Age: Dawn of the Dinosaurs	Additional voices (voice)	Film
2009	Monsters vs Aliens	Soldiers (voice)	Film
2010	Knucklehead	(voice)	Film
2012	Chronicle	Newscaster	Film
2013	Epic	Additional voices (voice)	Film
2018	The Lie	Additional voices (voice)	Film
2021	The Morning Show	Shane Card Services	TV episode: "Confirmations"

== Personal life ==
Adler was married to director, producer, writer, and acting/dialogue coach Ria Pavia from 1993 to 1995. He married actress Laura San Giacomo in 2000, and is a close friend and former housemate of actor George Clooney.
