= Diving In =

- Directed by: Strathford Hamilton
- Written by: Eric Edson
- Produced by: Jeffrey R. Neuman; Martin Wiley
- Cinematography: Hanania Baer
- Music by: Guy Moon
- Release date: September 21, 1990 (US)
- Running time: 92 min
- Country: United States
- Language: English

Diving In is a 1990 American film directed by former music video director Strathford Hamilton, starring Matt Adler and Kristy Swanson.

== Background ==
Diving In was the first film from the Indianapolis-based production company Maurer/Shaw Productions. Mark Shaw, one of the executive producers, said he wanted to make an Indiana film with Midwestern values "that [would] measure up to anything that comes out of Hollywood."

The movie was filmed around Indianapolis at locations including the Indiana University Natatorium and the Pike High School pool. Famed Indiana University diving coach Hobie Billingsley makes a cameo appearance during the final competition scene.

== Plot summary ==
Wayne Hopkins is a high school diver afraid of heights; he aspires to make the Olympic team but has nightmares about the high diving platforms of his sport, and as a result freezes up constantly. Causing more complications in his life are school bullies, his critical parents, and an adversarial coach who prefers rival athlete Jerome, who is fawned over by girls including Wayne's rebellious, heavy-drinking sister Terry.

Wayne enlists the help of a former women's Olympic coach to overcome his fear. His training ultimately leads him to the state finals, where he attempts a difficult, esoteric dive no one has ever performed at a state meet.

== Cast ==
- Matt Adler as Wayne Hopkins
- Kristy Swanson as Terry Hopkins
- Burt Young as Coach Mack
- Matt Lattanzi as Jerome Colter
- Yolanda Jilot as Amanda Lanski
- Richard Johnson as Richard Anthony
- Carey Scott as Ryes Wallstien
- John E. Blazier as Car Driver/Food Patron

== Critical reception ==
The movie received poor reviews from many outlets, primarily for what critics called a derivative plot. These included the Orlando Sentinel,; the Philadelphia Inquirer, which compared it unfavorably to other sports films like Rocky; and The Indianapolis News, which said it "makes diving as exciting as taped highlights of deliberations of UNESCO's Full Committee on the Standardization of Dry Measurements and Weights." Both the Inquirer and The Indianapolis News reviewers noted the fact that diving is a solo sport and argued that the film's treatment of it lacked drama.

The Indianapolis Star, while also noting cliched plot elements, was more positive, saying that the film "delivers what it promises--and delivers it well."
