= The Killing Jar (1997 film) =

- DVD cover
- Directed by: Evan Crooke
- Screenplay by: Mark Mullin
- Produced by: Evan Crooke; Stanley T. Crooke; Jason Saffran; Shelly Strong
- Starring: Brett Cullen; Tamlyn Tomita; Wes Studi; Xander Berkeley
- Cinematography: Michael G. Wojciechowski
- Edited by: Frederick Wardell
- Music by: David C. Williams
- Production company: Paragon Pictures
- Distributed by: A-Pix Entertainment
- Release date: May 27, 1997 (United States)
- Running time: 101 minutes
- Country: United States
- Language: English

The Killing Jar is a 1997 American horror thriller film directed by Evan Crooke and written by Mark Mullin. The film stars Brett Cullen, Tamlyn Tomita, Wes Studi and Xander Berkeley.

== Plot ==
Michael Sanford (Brett Cullen) relocates to his old town to manage the family business, taking his wife Diane (Tamlyn Tomita) with him. However, the community is soon gripped by fear as a series of child murders unfold. Michael's strange behavior makes Diane suspect his involvement in these murders.

== Cast ==
- Brett Cullen as Michael Sanford
- Tamlyn Tomita as Diane Sanford
- Wes Studi as Cameron
- Carlos Bernard as Chajen
- Xander Berkeley as Danny 'Figaretto' Evans
- Edith Varon as Martha Resigy
- Jack Wallace as Dick Resigy
- John Philbin as Pete Lawrence
- Tom Bower as Jake Pestone
- Frank McRae as Bernie Morris
- Brion James as Dr. Vincent Garret
- Michael Halpin as Stuart Weissman
- M. Emmet Walsh as Sheriff Foley
- Holley Chant as Katie
- James Noah as Robert Sanford

== Production ==
The film was an independent production, and director Evan C. Crooke's first film. Crooke was only in his mid-20s when he made The Killing Jar, having a few years earlier graduated from the University of Tampa (UT). Crooke struggled with dyslexia, and was guided through university by UT director of admissions Bob Cook, who himself overcame learning difficulties when he was younger. Cook died in a pedestrian accident a week before The Killing Jar began shooting, and the film would end up being dedicated to him. Shooting occurred around Los Angeles, California.

The Killing Jar was a success for Crooke, and became the impetus for him to start his own film company, Osirisent.

== Release and reception ==
In the United States, The Killing Jar was released direct-to-video on May 27, 1997 by A-Pix Entertainment. It was also released on video in several European countries that year, as well as in India and Malaysia. The international distribution of the film was handled by Curb International.

On June 11, 1997, a LaserDisc was released in the United States. The LaserDisc release was handled by Image Entertainment, who did numerous other releases on the format. In 1998, the film was released on DVD by Simtar Entertainment. It is currently available on digital platforms Amazon Prime, Apple TV and Tubi.

The film received a two out of five star rating on AllMovie. It has retrospectively been described as being part of a wave of serial killer-focused films from the 1990s.
