= Andy Martin (author) =

British writer and academic (born 20th century)

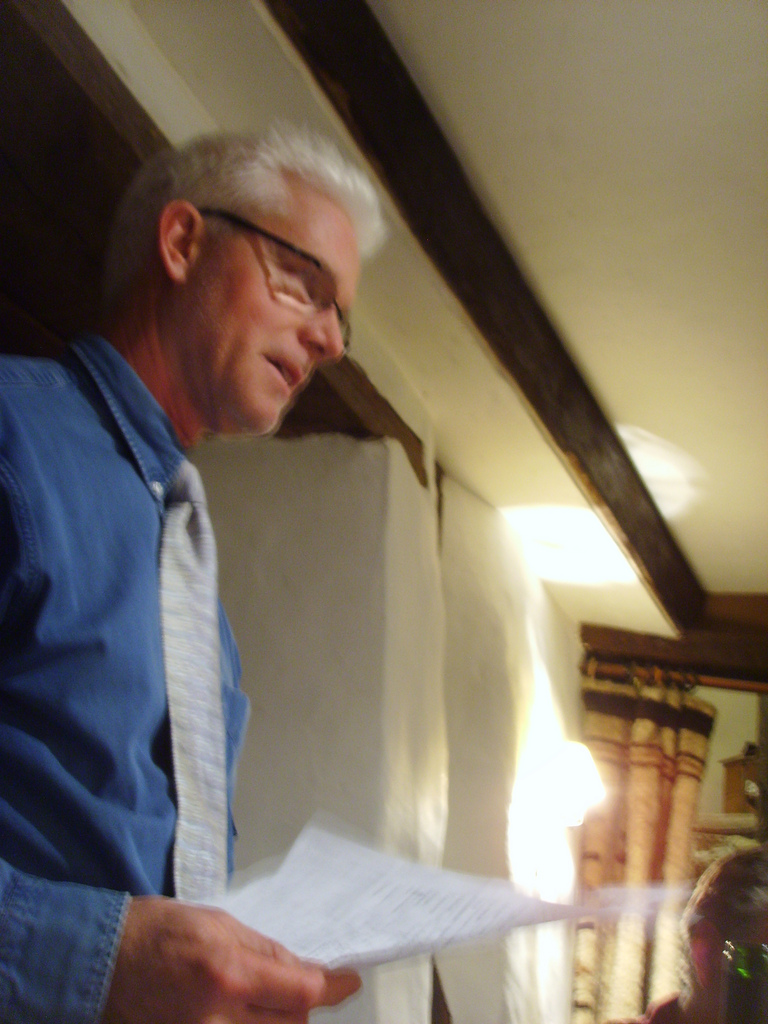
Andy Martin in November 2009

Andy Martin (born 20th century) is a British writer and academic.

He is a regular contributor to BBC Radio programmes and sometimes writes for The Stone and Opinionator columns in The New York Times. He has also written articles for the web broadcasting service SBS Broadcasting Group.

Martin scripted and produced the short film Once Upon a Time in New York in collaboration with Moving Content and likewise MML the Movie: Languages at Cambridge, directed by Will Frears with Norman Lomax. Both films feature original soundtracks by brothers Jack and Spencer Martin.

He is the inventor of Becksistentialism ("Existentialism with a very cool haircut"), inspired by footballer David Beckham's stint at Paris St Germain football club in 2013 and featured at Cambridge University's Festival of Ideas. His essay "The FBI Files on Being and Nothingness" was published by Prospect magazine and based on a lecture given at the Maison française, Columbia University, New York, as part of its centenary celebrations.

== Writer ==
Martin is the author of several books, including Beware Invisible Cows (described by The Independent newspaper as "a fantastic intellectual voyage, a real eye-opener"), Stealing the Wave (Bloomsbury, 2007), Napoleon the Novelist (Polity, 2001), Waiting for Bardot (Faber and Faber, 1996) and Walking on Water (John Murray and Minerva, 1992).

Walking on Water, Martin's first book on surfing, rapidly became a cult classic and was short-listed for the William Hill Sports Book of the Year, 1991.

Stealing the Wave: The Epic Struggle Between Ken Bradshaw and Mark Foo was described as "the finest sports book I've ever read" (Steve Bunce, BBC Radio) and an "Awesome read!" (Newcastle Herald, Australia). The Telegraph newspaper hailed it as a "terrific book".

Martin was the first surfing correspondent to The Times (London) and had the first-ever surfing column in a major newspaper in Britain (The Independent on Sunday).

Martin led a course in creative non-fiction at the Arvon Foundation in November 2009.

Waiting for Bardot was first optioned by Working Title. It is now scheduled to be made into a feature film directed by Will Frears, with shooting to begin in the near future.

His latest book, published by Simon & Schuster in 2012, is The Boxer and the Goalkeeper: Sartre vs Camus. The Scotsman describes it as "an elegant study, ... one of the most accessible and intelligent books on philosophy I have read this year, as alert to the human drama as the intellectual conflict, and unfailingly observant to the nuances and subtexts".

== Academic life ==
He has been a lecturer in the department of French at the University of Cambridge since 1990. His PhD is from King's College, Cambridge, on the subject of the knowledge of ignorance. He has been an associate research fellow at the Rutgers Center for Historical Analysis and a visiting scholar at Columbia University. In 2009, he was awarded a fellowship at the Cullman Centre for Scholars and Writers of the New York Public Library.

Martin was interviewed by the University of Cambridge Varsity newspaper in the May Week issue no. 699 and described as "something of a whispered myth amongst his many students".
