= Grant Major =

New Zealand film art director (born 1955)

Grant Major MNZM
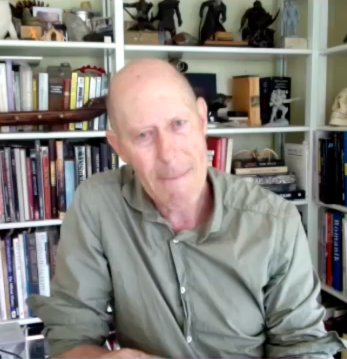
- Major in 2023
- Born: Grant McMillan Major; 1955 (age 70–71); Palmerston North, New Zealand
- Occupation: Art director
- Years active: 1979–present

Grant McMillan Major MNZM (born 1955) is a production designer from New Zealand who is most famous for his work on The Lord of the Rings films. He won the Academy Award for Best Art Direction for The Lord of the Rings: The Return of the King.

Major's early exposure to production design began when he joined art school in Auckland after completing his graduation, following which he got a job in the local television station as an assistant set designer.

== Recognition ==
In the 2004 Queen's Birthday Honours, Major was appointed a Member of the New Zealand Order of Merit, for services to film.

=== Oscar nominations ===
All of these are in Best Art Direction (renamed to Best Production Design in 2012).

- 2002 Academy Awards: Nominated for The Lord of the Rings: The Fellowship of the Ring. Nomination shared with Dan Hennah. Lost to Moulin Rouge!.
- 2003 Academy Awards: Nominated for The Lord of the Rings: The Two Towers. Nomination shared with Dan Hennah and Alan Lee. Lost to Chicago.
- 2004 Academy Awards: Won for The Lord of the Rings: The Return of the King. Award shared with Dan Hennah and Alan Lee.
- 2006 Academy Awards: Nominated for King Kong. Nomination shared with Dan Hennah and Simon Bright. Lost to Memoirs of a Geisha.
- 2022 Academy Awards: Nominated for The Power of the Dog. Nomination shared with Amber Richards. Lost to Dune.

== Selected filmography ==
As production designer

- The Frighteners (1996)
- The Lord of the Rings: The Fellowship of the Ring (2001)
- The Lord of the Rings: The Two Towers (2002)
- The Lord of the Rings: The Return of the King (2003)
- King Kong (2005)
- The Green Lantern (2011)
- Crouching Tiger, Hidden Dragon: Sword of Destiny (2016)
- X-Men: Apocalypse (2016)
- The Meg (2018)
- Mulan (2020)
- The Power of the Dog (2021)
- A Minecraft Movie (2025)
