= Dan Hennah =

New Zealand production designer

- Born: Hastings, New Zealand
- Occupation: Production designer
- Years active: 1983–present
- Spouse: Chris Hennah (17 March 1973 – present)

Dan Hennah is a production designer from New Zealand who worked on The Lord of the Rings and The Hobbit films. He won an Oscar for The Lord of the Rings: The Return of the King.

== Personal life ==
Dan Hennah has been married since 17 March 1973 to Chris Hennah. His wife also worked on the Lord of the Rings and Hobbit films as an art department manager.

== Filmography ==
- 1983: Nate and Hayes
- 1987: White Water Summer
- 1992 Cumulus 9
- 1999: The Tribe
- 2001: The Lord of the Rings: The Fellowship of the Ring
- 2002: The Lord of the Rings: The Two Towers
- 2003: The Lord of the Rings: The Return of the King
- 2005: King Kong
- 2007: The Water Horse: Legend of the Deep
- 2009: Underworld: Rise of the Lycans
- 2010: The Warrior's Way
- 2012: The Hobbit: An Unexpected Journey
- 2013: The Hobbit: The Desolation of Smaug
- 2014: The Hobbit: The Battle of the Five Armies
- 2016: Ice Fantasy
- 2016: Alice Through the Looking Glass
- 2017: Thor: Ragnarok
- 2018: Mortal Engines
- 2019: Dora and the Lost City of Gold
- 2020: Love and Monsters
- 2022: Disenchanted
- 2023: Percy Jackson and the Olympians

== Oscar nominations ==
All of these are in Best Art Direction.

- 2001 Academy Awards-Nominated for The Lord of the Rings: The Fellowship of the Ring. Nomination shared with Grant Major. Lost to Moulin Rouge!.
- 2002 Academy Awards-Nominated for The Lord of the Rings: The Two Towers. Nomination shared with Grant Major and Alan Lee. Lost to Chicago.
- 2003 Academy Awards-The Lord of the Rings: The Return of the King. Award shared with Grant Major and Alan Lee. Won.
- 2005 Academy Awards-Nominated for King Kong. Nomination shared with Grant Major and Simon Bright. Lost to Memoirs of a Geisha.
- 2012 Academy Awards-Nominated for The Hobbit: An Unexpected Journey. Nomination shared with Simon Bright and Ra Vincent. Lost to Lincoln.
