= White Water Summer =

1987 film by Jeff Bleckner

- Theatrical release poster
- Directed by: Jeff Bleckner
- Written by: Ernest Kinoy; Manya Starr
- Produced by: Mark Tarlov
- Starring: Kevin Bacon; Sean Astin; Jonathan Ward; Matt Adler
- Cinematography: John Alcott
- Edited by: David Ray
- Music by: Michael Boddicker
- Production company: Polar Entertainment
- Distributed by: Columbia Pictures
- Release date: July 10, 1987 (Pacific Northwest)
- Running time: 90 minutes
- Country: United States
- Language: English
- Box office: $300,859 (US)

White Water Summer is a 1987 American drama film directed by Jeff Bleckner and starring Kevin Bacon, Sean Astin, Jonathan Ward, and Matt Adler. The film was released on July 10, 1987, to mostly negative reviews from critics.

== Plot ==
Alan Block is a teenage city slicker with his whole summer planned out. That is, until his parents introduce him to Vic, a charming wilderness survival guide. Vic convinces them that six weeks off the grid is exactly what Alan needs to become a man.

Alan reluctantly joins Vic and three other teens – Chris, Mitch and George – for a trek into the great outdoors. However, he is taunted by Chris and George and learns that Vic is deadly serious about his job, but he does form a friendship with Mitch. On their first night, Alan carves his initials into a tree. After Vic finds out, he calls the others to vote on his punishment. They take away his knife.

In another incident, while the group goes swimming at a river, Alan and Mitch listen to a ball game on the radio, but Vic confiscates the radio. Later, Vic asks Alan to be his bowman while white water rafting. Alan is unprepared and loses an oar. While Vic praises Alan's efforts, Alan feels Vic set him up to fail. Later, Vic asks the boys to cross a dangerous rope bridge. Alan crosses it with the others but leaves their tent poles behind. Upon realizing this, Vic sends him back to collect them alone. In his attempt to re-cross the bridge, Alan steps on a severed rope, nearly falls into the ravine, and does not cross the bridge again. Embarrassed, he returns and explains that he could not find them, but Vic catches him in his lie; he watched him the entire way and even retrieved the poles.

The tension between Alan and Vic escalates when the group goes fishing on an island. Instead of following Vic's lead and catching them with his bare hands, Alan invents a fish trap. Furious, Vic tosses the fish he caught and forces him to clean the others’ fish. Alan refuses and Vic leaves with the group, stranding him on the island until the fish are cleaned. Alan stays on the island for the night, through a thunderstorm, and refuses to complete the task.

The next morning, the others retrieve him. When they return, they find that Vic has disappeared. The boys fight with each other about what to do and take cover after a storm hits. Vic suddenly returns the next morning and praises their survival skills.

Although everyone has grown weary of Vic, they follow him on their next group activity of climbing Devil's Tooth – a treacherous peak. When they reach a gap, Vic creates a pendulum for the boys to swing across. Alan is last to go but is the only one who does not make the jump. Despite the others’ protests, Vic leaves Alan dangling and instructs him to figure his own way out of it.

Chris challenges Vic's leadership and Vic retaliates by holding him over the edge of a cliff. Left to his own devices, Alan eventually creates enough momentum to swing across to safety. Upon catching up to the group, Alan and the others confront Vic and a foot chase ensues. Furious, Chris throws rocks at Vic and hits him with an oar, sending him over the edge of a ravine. With Vic having broken his leg in the fall, Alan creates a pulley and the group hoist him out of the ravine.

As the group's new leader, Alan instructs the others to follow the river to the ranger station. With Vic stable but losing blood, Alan sits him in a canoe and they raft down a wild river. Alan skillfully navigates the rapids but the canoe capsizes after plunging down a small waterfall. Alan brings Vic to the riverbank. The two share a moment of camaraderie and, soon enough, a rescue helicopter arrives.

Years later, Alan monologues to the audience reflecting on the time he spent with Vic that summer. He also mentions that the other three boys were rescued as well, and he and Vic have since made their peace. And every Summer since, Alan goes out to be one with nature. The camera then zooms out to show that Alan is in a city park and that he has no intention to ever do anything like that again.

== Cast ==
- Kevin Bacon as Vic
- Sean Astin as Alan Block
- Charles Siebert as Jerry Block
- Caroline McWilliams as Virginia Block
- Jonathan Ward as Mitch
- Matt Adler as Chris
- K. C. Martel as George

== Production and release ==
White Water Summer was originally produced as Rites of Summer in 1985, and given its current name upon release in 1987. The film's action is framed by commentary from the now-older character of Alan (Sean Astin), as he remembers a camping trip led by Vic (Kevin Bacon). The narration was filmed two years after the film itself; Astin is noticeably older.

The film was photographed by John Alcott, a frequent collaborator of Stanley Kubrick. Alcott died shortly before the release of the film, which is dedicated to his memory. Scenes were shot in California's Sierra Nevada mountains, as well as in western Quebec, Canada, at the small French Quebec town of Fort-Coulonge, and New Zealand locales.

Columbia Pictures released the film theatrically in the Pacific Northwest region of the United States; a wider release was planned, but never carried out.

== Reception ==
White Water Summer received largely negative reviews from critics. On Rotten Tomatoes, the film has a "rotten" score of 25% with an average rating of 4.50/10, based on eight reviews. Betsy Bozdech of DVD Journal gave the film a negative review, calling it a "jumpy, poorly developed coming-of-age story." Scott Weinberg of eFilmCritic.com panned the film, deeming it a "choppy and limp outdoor adventure that you really don't need to see." David Nusair of ReelFilm.com gave the film a more middling review, deeming it an "innocuous drama revolving around the exploits of several campers and their seemingly amiable guide."

== Music ==
- The film's closing credits are accompanied by the song "Be Good to Yourself" by Journey.

Nine songs are included in the film:

- "Wild Frontier"

Written by Bruce Hornsby and John Hornsby
Performed by Bruce Hornsby and The Range
Courtesy of The RCA Records Label of BMG Music

- "On the Western Skyline"

Written by Bruce Hornsby and John Hornsby
Performed by Bruce Hornsby and The Range
Courtesy of The RCA Records Label of BMG Music

- "Be Good to Yourself"

Written by Steve Perry, Jonathan Cain and Neal Schon
Performed by Journey
Courtesy of CBS Records

- "Aphrodisiac Jacket"

Written by Ian Astbury and Billy Duffy
Produced by Rick Rubin
Performed by The Cult
Courtesy of Sire Records by arrangement with Warner Special Products and Beggars Banquet Records Limited

- "Life in a Dangerous Time"

Written by Nick Van Eede (as Nicholas Eede)
Produced by Terry Brown & Cutting Crew
Performed by Cutting Crew
Courtesy of Siren Records Ltd.

- "Streetwalker"

Composed, Produced and Performed by Michael Boddicker

- "Paradise"

Written by Kaylee Adams and Charlie Mitchell
Produced by Charlie Mitchell
Performed by Kaylee Adams
Courtesy of Warner Bros. Records

- "Hot Shot"

Written by Mike Slamer, Roy Ward and John Luttrelle
Produced by Mike Slamer
Performed by Roy Ward

- "Restless Heart"

Written by Mike Slamer and Mark Boals
Produced by Mike Slamer
Performed by Mark Boals

== See also ==
- Survival film
