= The Hobbit: An Unexpected Journey =

2012 fantasy film directed by Peter Jackson

- Theatrical release poster
- Directed by: Peter Jackson
- Screenplay by: Fran Walsh; Philippa Boyens; Peter Jackson; Guillermo del Toro
- Based on: The Hobbit by J. R. R. Tolkien
- Produced by: Carolynne Cunningham; Zane Weiner; Fran Walsh; Peter Jackson
- Starring: Ian McKellen; Martin Freeman; Richard Armitage; James Nesbitt; Ken Stott; Cate Blanchett; Ian Holm; Christopher Lee; Hugo Weaving; Elijah Wood; Andy Serkis
- Cinematography: Andrew Lesnie
- Edited by: Jabez Olssen
- Music by: Howard Shore
- Production companies: New Line Cinema; Metro-Goldwyn-Mayer Pictures; WingNut Films
- Distributed by: Warner Bros. Pictures
- Release dates: 28 November 2012 (Wellington premiere); 12 December 2012 (New Zealand); 14 December 2012 (United States)
- Running time: 169 minutes
- Countries: New Zealand; United States
- Language: English
- Budget: $200–315 million
- Box office: $1.017 billion

The Hobbit: An Unexpected Journey is a 2012 epic fantasy film directed by Peter Jackson from a screenplay by Fran Walsh, Philippa Boyens, Jackson, and Guillermo del Toro. It is based on the 1937 novel The Hobbit by J. R. R. Tolkien. The film is the first installment in The Hobbit trilogy, acting as a prequel to Jackson's The Lord of the Rings trilogy (2001–2003). The story is set in Middle-earth sixty years before the main events of The Lord of the Rings and portions of the film are adapted from the appendices to Tolkien's The Return of the King. An Unexpected Journey tells the tale of Bilbo Baggins (Martin Freeman), who is convinced by the wizard Gandalf (Ian McKellen) to accompany thirteen Dwarves, led by Thorin Oakenshield (Richard Armitage), on a quest to reclaim the Lonely Mountain from the dragon Smaug. The ensemble cast also includes Ken Stott, Cate Blanchett, Ian Holm, Christopher Lee, Hugo Weaving, James Nesbitt, Elijah Wood, and Andy Serkis. It features Sylvester McCoy, Barry Humphries, and Manu Bennett.

An Unexpected Journey premiered in Wellington on 28 November 2012, then released on 12 December in New Zealand and on 14 December in the United States, by Warner Bros. Pictures. It was almost nine years after the release of The Lord of the Rings: The Return of the King. The film received mixed reviews from critics and grossed $1.017 billion at the box office, making it the fourth highest-grossing film of 2012 and the highest-grossing film of The Hobbit trilogy. The film received numerous accolades; at the 85th Academy Awards, it was nominated for Best Production Design, Best Makeup and Hairstyling, and Best Visual Effects.

Two sequels, The Desolation of Smaug and The Battle of the Five Armies followed in 2013 and 2014, respectively.

== Plot ==
Before his 111th birthday, (Note: As depicted in The Lord of the Rings: The Fellowship of the Ring (2001)) the Hobbit Bilbo Baggins writes a story of his adventure for his nephew, Frodo.

Many years ago, the Dwarf king Thrór led his kin to prosperity under the Lonely Mountain until the dragon Smaug arrived. Smaug destroyed Dale, drove the Dwarves from their mountain, and took their gold. Thrór's grandson, Thorin Oakenshield, appealed to Elf king Thranduil for help, but was denied, causing him to hate Elves.

In the Shire, 51-year-old Bilbo is tricked by the wizard Gandalf the Grey into hosting a dinner for Thorin and his company of Dwarves: Balin, Dwalin, Fíli, Kíli, Dori, Nori, Ori, Óin, Glóin, Bifur, Bofur, and Bombur. Gandalf aims to recruit Bilbo as the company's "burglar" to assist them in their quest to enter the Lonely Mountain. Reluctant at first, Bilbo changes his mind after the company leaves without him the next day, racing to join them. Traveling onward, they are captured by three Trolls. Bilbo delays the Trolls from eating them until dawn, and Gandalf exposes them to sunlight, turning them to stone. The company discovers the Trolls' cave, where they find treasure and Elven blades. Thorin and Gandalf each take an Elf-made blade, Orcrist and Glamdring, respectively; Gandalf gives an Elven dagger to Bilbo.

The wizard Radagast the Brown finds the company and tells Gandalf about his encounter with the Necromancer, a sorcerer who has been corrupting Greenwood with dark magic, at Dol Guldur. Chased by Orcs, Gandalf leads them through a hidden passage to Rivendell. There, Lord Elrond discloses a hidden indication of a secret door on the company's map of the Lonely Mountain, which will be visible only on Durin's Day. Gandalf approaches the White Council — consisting of Elrond, Galadriel and Saruman the White — and presents a Morgul blade, the Witch-king of Angmar's weapon, which Radagast obtained from Dol Guldur as a sign that the Necromancer is linked to an eventual return of Sauron. Saruman expresses concern about the Dwarves' quest and requests Gandalf to end it. However, Gandalf secretly reveals to Galadriel that he anticipated this and had the Dwarves move forward without him.

The company ventures into the Misty Mountains and evades fighting Stone Giants. They seek refuge in a cave but are captured by Goblins and taken to their leader, the Great Goblin. Bilbo becomes separated from the Dwarves and falls into a crevice where he meets Gollum, who accidentally drops a golden ring. Bilbo pockets the ring and confronts Gollum. They play a riddle game, wagering that if Bilbo wins, he will be shown the way out; if he loses, Gollum will eat him. Bilbo tricks Gollum and wins, but Gollum realizes his ring is missing. Chased by Gollum, Bilbo discovers the ring grants him invisibility. As he escapes, Bilbo briefly considers killing Gollum, but spares him out of pity.

The Great Goblin informs the Dwarves that Azog, an Orc war-chief who killed Thrór and lost a hand to Thorin outside of Moria, has placed a bounty on Thorin. Gandalf arrives, helps the Dwarves escape, and kills the Great Goblin. Bilbo reunites with the group and hides his new ring. The company is ambushed by Azog and takes refuge in trees. Thorin charges Azog but is injured by his Warg. Bilbo saves Thorin and confronts Azog, just as eagles summoned by Gandalf to rescue them arrive.

The company escapes to Carrock, where Gandalf heals Thorin, who then renounces his disdain for Bilbo. They see the Lonely Mountain in the distance, where the sleeping Smaug is awoken by a thrush knocking a snail against a stone.

== Cast ==
The characters of Galadriel, Saruman, and Frodo Baggins appear in the novel The Lord of the Rings, but not in the novel The Hobbit. (Radagast was also dropped from the film version of Lord of the Rings, merely being mentioned in passing). Gandalf, Gollum, Bilbo Baggins, Elrond and the Necromancer appear in both novels, although the latter is referred to in Lord of the Rings as Sauron. Only Bilbo is portrayed by a different actor in the two sets of films, as the age difference affects his character more. The older Bilbo (Ian Holm) appears in the prologue section of this film.

- Martin Freeman as Young Bilbo Baggins: a hobbit hired by the wizard Gandalf to accompany 13 dwarves on a quest to reclaim the Lonely Mountain from the dragon Smaug.
  - Ian Holm, who portrayed Old Bilbo Baggins in The Lord of the Rings trilogy appears also in scenes that take place directly before the events of The Fellowship of the Ring.
- Ian McKellen as Gandalf the Grey: a wizard who recruits Bilbo and helps to arrange the quest to reclaim the dwarves' lost treasure in Erebor. Gandalf was also portrayed by McKellen in The Lord of the Rings film trilogy.
- Richard Armitage as Thorin Oakenshield II: the leader of the Company of dwarves who has set out to reclaim his birthright as King of the Lonely Mountain from Smaug.
- Ken Stott as Balin: Dwalin's brother. He is described in the novel as "always their look-out man".
- Graham McTavish as Dwalin: Balin's brother.
- Aidan Turner as Kíli: Thorin's nephew and Fíli's younger brother.
- Dean O'Gorman as Fíli: Thorin's nephew and Kíli's older brother.
- Mark Hadlow as Dori: Nori and Ori's brother. He is described in the novel as "a decent fellow, despite his grumbling", while Thorin described him as being the strongest member of the company. Hadlow also plays Bert the Stone-troll.
- Jed Brophy as Nori: Dori and Ori's brother.
- Adam Brown as Ori: Dori and Nori's brother.
- John Callen as Óin: Gloin's brother.
- Peter Hambleton as Glóin: Óin's brother. Hambleton also plays William the Stone-troll.
- William Kircher as Bifur: Bofur and Bombur's cousin. Kircher also plays Tom the Stone-troll.
- James Nesbitt as Bofur: Bombur's brother and Bifur's cousin, described as "a disarmingly forthright, funny and occasionally brave Dwarf".
- Stephen Hunter as Bombur: Bofur's brother and Bifur's cousin; described in the novel as fat and clumsy.
- Cate Blanchett as Galadriel: the elven co-ruler of Lothlórien along with her husband, Lord Celeborn. She was also portrayed by Blanchett in The Lord of the Rings film trilogy.
- Hugo Weaving as Elrond: the Elven-Lord of Rivendell, who gives shelter to Bilbo's party, despite Thorin's great suspicion of Elves. He was also portrayed by Weaving in The Lord of the Rings film trilogy.
- Christopher Lee as Saruman the White: the head of the Istari Order and its White Council. He was also portrayed by Lee in The Lord of the Rings film trilogy.
- Elijah Wood as Frodo Baggins: Bilbo's favourite nephew. His scenes take place shortly before the events of The Fellowship of the Ring.
- Sylvester McCoy as Radagast the Brown: a wizard whose wisdom involves nature and wildlife.
- Andy Serkis as Gollum: a wretched hobbit-like creature corrupted by the One Ring. Serkis portrayed Gollum through motion-capture, as he did in The Lord of the Rings film trilogy. Serkis also acted as second unit director of the trilogy.
- Manu Bennett as Azog the Defiler: the Orc chieftain of Moria who beheaded King Thrór in the battle of Azanulbizar and now hunts for Thorin and his company after taking an oath to break the line of Durin. He leads a band of Hunter Orcs and rides a huge white warg.
- Barry Humphries as the Great Goblin: the king of the caverns of Goblin Town in the Misty Mountains.
- Conan Stevens as Bolg: son of Azog.
- John Rawls as Yazneg: Azog's second-in-command. Movement choreographer Terry Notary played Yazneg during pick-up shots.
- Bret McKenzie as Lindir: an elf of Rivendell.
- Kiran Shah as the Goblin scribe: a scribe and messenger for the Great Goblin.
- Jeffrey Thomas as Thrór: the former king of Durin's Folk and Thorin's grandfather.
- Stephen Ure as Fimbul, one of Azog's Orc hunters, and lieutenant to Yazneg. After Yazneg is killed, Fimbul becomes Azog's right-hand man. Ure also played a goblin, named Grinnah, who acted as the Great Goblin's acolyte.
- Michael Mizrahi as Thráin II: the last Dwarf-King of Erebor and Thorin's father.
- Benedict Cumberbatch as the voice of the dragon Smaug, as well as The Necromancer, a mysterious sorcerer residing in Dol Guldur with the ability to summon the spirits of the dead. Cumberbatch provided performance capture for the character's brief appearance in this film.

Cameos in the film include director Peter Jackson and editor Jabez Olssen as Erebor Dwarf refugees running from the dragon Smaug in the opening prologue; picture double Hayden J. Weal as a dwarf carrying gems during Thranduil's visit in Erebor; James Nesbitt's then-wife Sonia Forbes-Adam as Belladonna Took, Bilbo's mother; Nesbitt's daughters Peggy and Mary as children of Dale; Luke Evans as Girion; and production designer Dan Hennah as the Old Took, Belladonna's father. Peter Jackson's daughter, Philippa Boyens's second son, and Andy Serkis's children appeared in the Old Took's party; and Jabez Olssen's wife and children, Weta Workshop founder Richard Taylor's children, and set decorator Ra Vincent's children can all be seen in the market scene. Writer for Ain'tItCoolNews.com, Eric Vespe, portrays Fredegar Chubb, the fish seller at the market. The appearances in the Old Took's party and the market scene are shown only in the extended edition.

== Production ==
=== Development ===
A film adaptation of J. R. R. Tolkien's novel The Hobbit (1937) was in development for several years after the critical and financial success of The Lord of the Rings film trilogy (2001–2003), co-written, co-produced, and directed by Peter Jackson. Jackson was initially going to produce and write a two-film adaptation of The Hobbit, which was to be directed by Guillermo del Toro. Del Toro left the project in May 2010, after about two years of working with Jackson and his production team, due to delays caused in part by financial problems at Metro-Goldwyn-Mayer. Jackson was announced as director that October. The Hobbit films were produced back to back, like The Lord of the Rings films. Principal photography for The Hobbit films began on 21 March 2011 in New Zealand and ended on 6 July 2012, after 266 days of filming. Pick-ups for An Unexpected Journey were filmed in July 2012 as well. Work on the film was expected to be completed on 26 November, just two days prior to the film's Wellington premiere.

Jackson had said that del Toro's sudden exit created problems as he felt he had a very little preparation time remaining before shooting had to begin, with unfinished scripts and without storyboards, which increased the difficulty to direct it. Jackson stated, "Because Guillermo del Toro had to leave and I jumped in and took over, we didn't wind the clock back a year and a half and give me a year and a half prep to design the movie, which was different to what he was doing. It was impossible, and as a result of it being impossible I just started shooting the movie with most of it not prepped at all. You're going on to a set and you're winging it, you've got these massively complicated scenes, no storyboards and you're making it up there and then on the spot."

Jackson also said, "I spent most of The Hobbit feeling like I was not on top of it. Even from a script point of view, Fran [Walsh], Philippa [Boyens] and I hadn't got the entire scripts written to our satisfaction, so that was a very high pressure situation". However, Jackson goes on to explain in the DVD/Blu-ray featurettes the various ways in which he and his crew overcame the obstacles encountered during filming. They found ways of making things work, even in a "very high pressure situation" in which he and his crew found themselves, especially the shooting of the Battle of the Five Armies which was shifted from 2012 to 2013 to be properly planned and shot.

=== High frame rate ===
The Hobbit: An Unexpected Journey used a shooting and projection frame rate of 48 frames per second, becoming the first feature film with a wide release to do so. The new projection rate was advertised as "High Frame Rate" to the general public. However, the majority of cinemas projected the film at the industry standard 24 fps after the film was converted.

=== Score ===
The musical score for An Unexpected Journey was composed, orchestrated, and conducted by Howard Shore. It was performed by the London Philharmonic Orchestra, London Voices and Tiffin' Boys Choir and featured several vocal soloists. The score reprised many themes from the Lord of the Rings trilogy but also introduced numerous new themes, including Shore's orchestral setting of the diegetic "Misty Mountains" song.

=== Animal deaths ===
At the facility where about 150 animals were housed for the production of The Hobbit: An Unexpected Journey, up to 27 animals died. The animals in question were horses, goats, chickens and one sheep.

== Distribution ==
=== Marketing ===
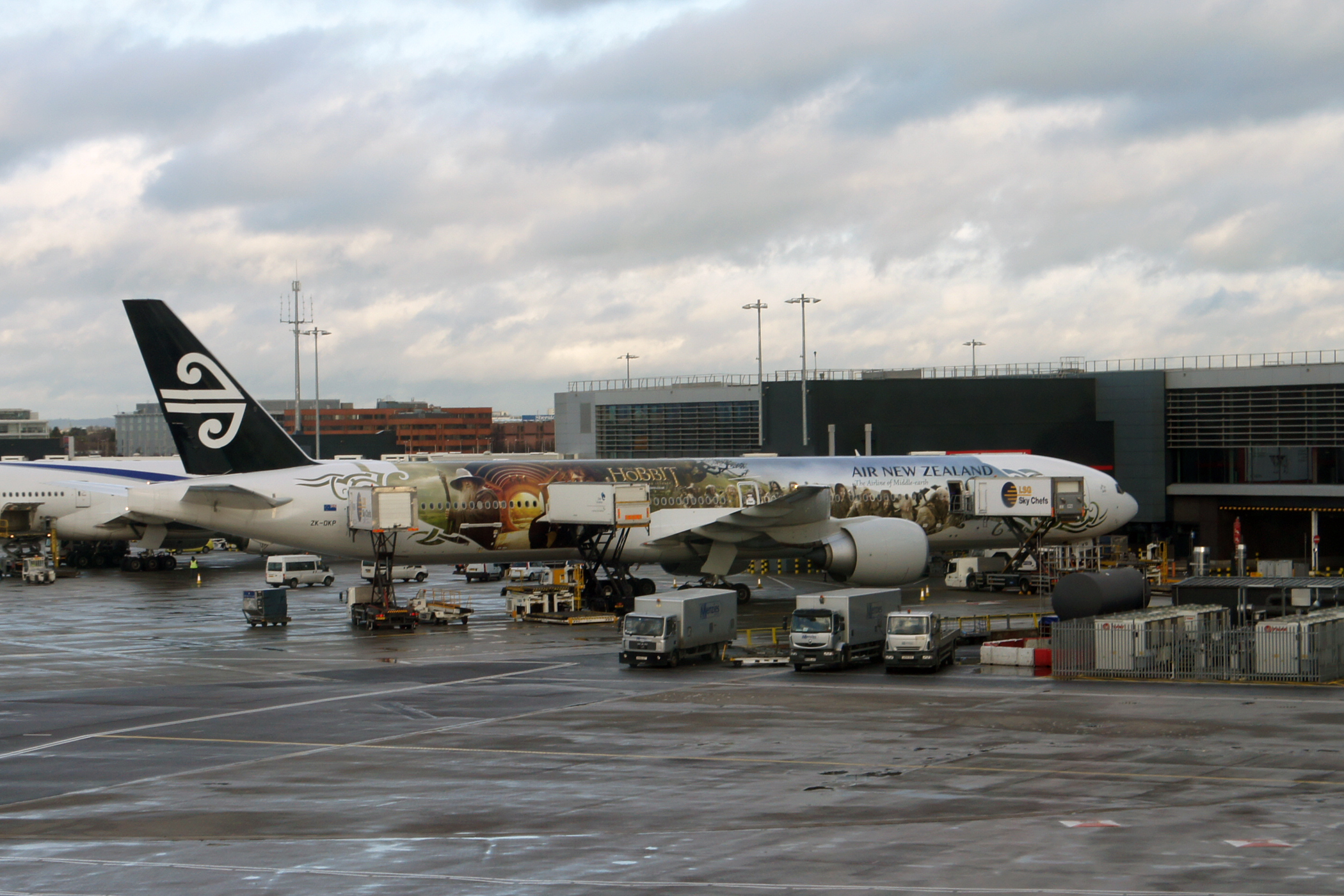
Air New Zealand B-777-300 with "The Airline of Middle-earth" livery to promote the film The Hobbit: An Unexpected Journey, at London Heathrow Airport

The first trailer for An Unexpected Journey was first screened before the Jackson-produced The Adventures of Tintin in the US on 21 December 2011, and released on the Internet on the same day. Geoff Boucher of the Los Angeles Times said, "While it was all too fleeting there was enough in it to stir the heart of fans." Jen Chaney of The Washington Post stated, "Visually and tonally, this preview for [An Unexpected Journey] looks like a perfect match for the Frodo Baggins tales that released in 2001, 2002 and 2003. […] But plot isn't the main matter at hand in the trailer… This clip is all about reacquainting us with Middle-earth."

Jackson, Freeman, McKellen, Armitage, Serkis, Wood, and co-screenwriter Philippa Boyens appeared at the 2012 San Diego Comic-Con promoting the film and screening 12 minutes of footage.

On 8 October 2012, Wellington Mayor Celia Wade-Brown announced that for the week of the premiere of The Hobbit: An Unexpected Journey, the capital of New Zealand would be renamed the "Middle of Middle-earth".

=== Video games ===
- Guardians of Middle-earth, which was released with the special disclaimer on the front art, marking the connection to the feature film and contains models and characters from The Hobbit: An Unexpected Journey, including Nori, Gollum, Dwalin and others.
- Lego The Lord of the Rings, which was released around the same time as the motion picture and contains a Lego model of Radagast, based on his portrayal in The Hobbit: An Unexpected Journey.
- The Hobbit: Kingdoms of Middle-earth, which features characters and locations as well as the elements of the official soundtrack.

=== Theatrical release ===
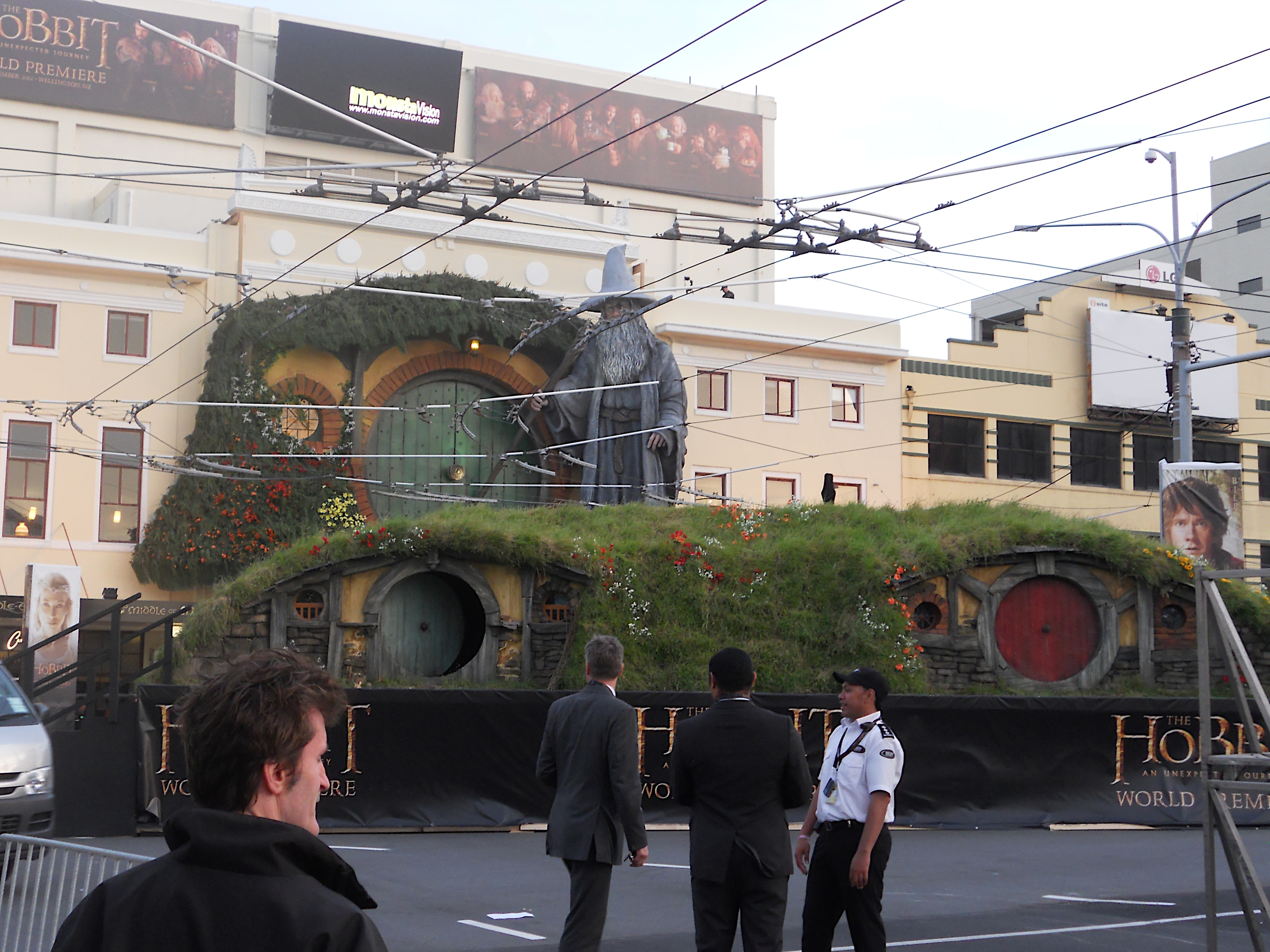
A standee outside the Embassy Theatre in Wellington, New Zealand at the world premiere of The Hobbit: An Unexpected Journey

The world premiere of The Hobbit: An Unexpected Journey took place on 28 November 2012 at the Embassy Theatre in Wellington, New Zealand, with a full theatrical release in New Zealand on 12 December. The film was released 13 December 2012 in Europe, 14 December 2012 in India, Canada and United States, and 26 December 2012 (Boxing Day) in Australia. It was also screened at the 65th Royal Film Performance in London on 12 December 2012, an event that was held in aid of the Film & TV Charity and saw Prince William in attendance, who spoke with Martin Freeman about his enthusiasm for Tolkien's works. Prince Charles had visited Peter Jackson, the Wētā Workshop and met members of the cast a week before the New Zealand premiere.

Around 100,000 people lined the red carpet on Courtenay Place for the film's premiere, and the entire event was broadcast live on TV in New Zealand, as well as streaming over the internet.

An extended edition of the film had a limited re-release on 5 October 2015, accompanied by a special greeting from Peter Jackson.

=== Home media ===
The Hobbit: An Unexpected Journey was released on DVD, Blu-ray and Blu-ray 3D on 19 March 2013, with an extended edition, with 13 minutes of additional footage and three bonus discs containing approximately nine hours of special features, released on 5 November 2013. An Unexpected Journey's home video sales made a revenue of $99 million with 6.2 million copies sold, making it the third best-selling title of 2013 behind Despicable Me 2 and The Twilight Saga: Breaking Dawn – Part 2. In the United Kingdom, the film was released on 8 April 2013.

An Unexpected Journey was released in Ultra HD Blu-ray on 30 November 2020 in the United Kingdom and on 1 December 2020 in the United States, along with the other films of the trilogy, including both the theatrical and the extended editions of the films.

== Reception ==
=== Box office ===
The Hobbit: An Unexpected Journey grossed $303 million in the United States and Canada and $718.1 million elsewhere for a worldwide total of $1.017 billion, becoming the 15th film in history to reach $1 billion. It is the fourth highest-grossing film of 2012. It scored a worldwide opening weekend of $222.6 million, including $15.1 million from 452 IMAX theatres around the world, which was an IMAX opening-weekend record for December.

An Unexpected Journey earned $13.0 million during its midnight run, setting a December midnight record (previously held by Avatar). It then topped the box office on its opening day (Friday, 14 December 2012) earning $37.1 million from 4,045 theatres (midnight earnings included), setting a December opening-day record (previously held by The Lord of the Rings: The Return of the King). By the end of its first weekend it grossed $84.62 million, finishing in first place and setting a then December opening-weekend record (previously held by I Am Legend). 3D showings accounted for 49% of weekend ticket sales while IMAX showings generated $10.1 million (12% of the weekend gross). The film held onto the top spot for a second weekend, despite declining 57% to $36.7 million. An Unexpected Journey remained at the top of the box office during its third weekend, dropping only 11% to $32.9 million.

An Unexpected Journey earned $11.2 million on its opening day (Wednesday, 12 December 2012) from 16 markets. Through its first Sunday, it managed a five-day opening-weekend gross of just under $138 million. It topped the box office outside North America on two consecutive weekends. In Sweden, it scored the second-largest five-day opening with $6.2 million (behind Harry Potter and the Deathly Hallows – Part 2). Its three largest openings occurred in the UK, Ireland, and Malta ($18.8 million); Russia and the CIS ($17.8 million), and Germany ($17.1 million).

=== Critical response ===
After the New Zealand premiere, Television New Zealand noted that critical responses were "largely positive" but with "mixed responses to the film's technological advances". After the film's international release, Forbes called reviews "unenthusiastic" and the Los Angeles Times said the critical consensus is that the film "stumbles".

The film holds a 64% rating on Rotten Tomatoes based on 303 reviews, with an average score of 6.60/10. The site's consensus reads "Peter Jackson's return to Middle-earth is an earnest, visually resplendent trip, but the film's deliberate pace robs the material of some of its majesty." On Metacritic, the film has a score of 58 out of 100 based on collected reviews from 40 critics, indicating "mixed or average reviews".

The main contention of debate was regarding the film's length, its high frame rate, and whether or not the film matched the level of expectation built from The Lord of the Rings film trilogy, while the film's visual style, special effects, music score, and cast were praised, especially the performances of Martin Freeman, Ian McKellen, Richard Armitage, and Andy Serkis. Audiences polled by CinemaScore, during the opening weekend, gave the film an "A" grade on a scale from A+ to F.

Peter Travers of Rolling Stone criticised the film's use of "48 frames per second… Couple that with 3D and the movie looks so hyper-real that you see everything that's fake about it… The 169 minutes of screen time hurts, since the first 45 minutes of the film traps us in the hobbit home of the young Bilbo Baggins," but continued with "Once Bilbo and the dwarves set on their journey… things perk up considerably. Trolls, orcs, wolves and mountainous monsters made of remarkably pliable stone bring out the best in Jackson and his Rings co-screenwriters Fran Walsh and Philippa Boyens."

Robbie Collin of The Daily Telegraph gave the film two stars out of five and said "Thank heavens for Andy Serkis, whose riddling return as Gollum steals the entire film. It is the only time the digital effects and smoother visuals underline, rather than undermine, the mythical drama of Bilbo's adventure. As a lover of cinema, Jackson’s film bored me rigid; as a lover of Tolkien, it broke my heart." He thought the film was "so stuffed with extraneous faff and flummery that it often barely feels like Tolkien at all – more a dire, fan-written internet tribute."

Time Out magazine's Keith Uhlich called the film "a mesmerizing study in excess, Peter Jackson and company's long-awaited prequel to the Lord of the Rings saga is bursting with surplus characters, wall-to-wall special effects, unapologetically drawn-out story tangents and double the frame rate (48 over 24) of the average movie."

Peter Bradshaw of The Guardian commented on the length of the film and the high frame rate, writing "After 170 minutes, I felt that I had had enough of a pretty good thing. The trilogy will test the stamina of the non-believers, and many might feel ... that the traditional filmic look of Lord of the Rings was better."

Richard Lawson from The Atlantic Wire commented on the film's "video game"-like visual effects, saying "this is a dismally unattractive movie, featuring too many shots that I'm sure were lovely at some point but are now ruined and chintzified by the terrible technology monster."

Matthew Leyland of Total Film gave the film a five-star rating and said that it is "Charming, spectacular, technically audacious… in short, everything you expect from a Peter Jackson movie. A feeling of familiarity does take hold in places, but this is an epically entertaining first course." Ed Gonzalez of Slant Magazine awarded the film three stars out of four and called it "The first of an arguably gratuitous three-part cine-extravaganza."

Todd McCarthy of The Hollywood Reporter said that "Jackson and his colleagues have created a purist's delight… [And leads to] an undeniably exciting, action-packed climax." McCarthy did however think that "Though there are elements in this new film that are as spectacular as much of the Rings trilogy was... there is much that is flat-footed and tedious as well, especially in the early going."

Kate Muir of The Times gave the film four out of five stars, saying Martin Freeman "perks up" the film as Bilbo Baggins and that Jackson's use of 48 frames per second 3D technology gives the film "lurid clarity".

Dan Jolin of Empire gave the film four out of five stars and thought "The Hobbit plays younger and lighter than Fellowship and its follow-ups, but does right by the faithful and has a strength in Martin Freeman's Bilbo that may yet see this trilogy measure up to the last one" and he stated that "There is treasure here".

=== Accolades ===
The film received three Academy Award nominations for Best Visual Effects, Best Production Design, and Best Makeup and Hairstyling as well as praise from critics organisation Broadcast Film Critics Association and from critics groups, such as the Houston Film Critics Society, Phoenix Film Critics Society and Washington D.C. Area Film Critics Association. The film's team won an Academy Scientific and Technical Award—the Scientific and Engineering Award for inventing a technique which has made huge advances in bringing to life computer-generated characters such as Gollum in the film to the screen. In January 2013, it was announced The Hobbit: An Unexpected Journey was nominated in the Best Live Action Motion Picture category at the Cinema Audio Society Awards, awarded on 16 February.

An Unexpected Journey led the nominations at the 39th Saturn Awards with nine, more than The Lord of the Rings: The Fellowship of the Ring which earned eight nominations at the time of its release. These nominations included Best Director (Peter Jackson's eleventh Saturn Award nomination), Best Actor for Martin Freeman, Best Supporting Actor for Ian McKellen (his third nomination for playing Gandalf) and Best Music for Howard Shore. It won Best Production Design for Dan Hennah, Ra Vincent and Simon Bright.

An Unexpected Journey also earned five nominations at the 18th Empire Awards, winning in two categories, Best Actor for Martin Freeman and Best Science Fiction/Fantasy Film. It also earned two nominations at the 2013 MTV Movie Awards in the categories Best Scared-as-S**t Performance and Best Hero for Martin Freeman. Freeman won the latter award for his performance. It has gathered 6 nominations at the 2013 SFX Awards, including Best Film, Best Director for Peter Jackson and four acting nominations.
