= Simon Bright =

Set decorator and art director

- Occupations: Art director and set decorator
- Years active: 1996–present

Simon Bright is an art director and set decorator who is best known for The Lord of the Rings films.

== Oscar nominations ==
Both of these are in Best Art Direction.

- 2005 Academy Awards-Nominated for King Kong. Nomination shared with Dan Hennah and Grant Major. Lost to Memoirs of a Geisha.
- 2012 Academy Awards-Nominated for The Hobbit: An Unexpected Journey. Nomination shared with Dan Hennah and Ra Vincent. Lost to Lincoln.

== Selected filmography ==
- The Hobbit: The Battle of the Five Armies (2014)
- The Hobbit: The Desolation of Smaug (2013)
- The Hobbit: An Unexpected Journey (2012)
- Avatar (2009)
- King Kong (2005)
- The Lord of the Rings: The Return of the King (2003)
- The Lord of the Rings: The Two Towers (2002)
- The Lord of the Rings: The Fellowship of the Ring (2001)
