= Ken Bradshaw =

American surfer

Ken Bradshaw (born October 4, 1952) is an American professional surfer and winner of the 1982 Duke Kahanamoku Invitational Surfing Championship.

Bradshaw was born in Houston, Texas. On January 28, 1998, Bradshaw successfully towed into and rode a wave with a face allegedly of about 80 feet (24 m). The site was Outside Log Cabins, an outer reef on the North Shore of Oahu, Hawaii. The ride lasted about 30 seconds.

Bradshaw took part in a hypothermia experiment for Discovery Channel which lasted for 4 hours at 0 °C (32 °F) without clothing. His body temperature dropped to 35 °C (95 °F).

== Lifestyle ==
Bradshaw is a vegetarian. He was Layne Beachley's partner, helping her to become one of the world's top female surfers.
