= Mortal Engines Quartet =

Series of novels by Philip Reeve

- Original cover designs for the Mortal Engines Quartet
- Mortal Engines (2001); Predator's Gold (2003); Infernal Devices (2005); A Darkling Plain (2006)
- Author: Philip Reeve
- Cover artist: David Frankland; David Wyatt
- Country: United Kingdom
- Language: English
- Genre: Young adult; Dystopian; Steampunk; Post-apocalyptic; Bildungsroman
- Publisher: Scholastic
- Published: 2001–2006
- Media type: Print (hardback and paperback); Audiobook
- Followed by: Fever Crumb Series

The Mortal Engines Quartet (Hungry City Chronicles in the United States), also known as the Predator Cities Quartet, is a series of epic young adult steampunk novels by the English novelist and illustrator Philip Reeve. He began the first volume of the series, Mortal Engines, in the 1980s, and it was published in 2001. Reeve then published three further novels, Predator's Gold (2003), Infernal Devices (2005), and A Darkling Plain (2006).

The series is set thousands of years in the future, after the Sixty Minute War has devastated Earth. It tells the stories of young adventurers in the Traction Era, when moving cities roam the wasteland, attacking and devouring each other for resources. The novels have won a number of awards, including the Nestlé Smarties Book Prize in 2002 for Mortal Engines, the 2006 Guardian Children's Fiction Prize, and the 2007 Los Angeles Times Book Prize for Young Adult Fiction for A Darkling Plain.

A companion piece entitled The Traction Codex was released in 2011, and was expanded into The Illustrated World of Mortal Engines by Reeve and Jeremy Levett and published in 2018. Additionally, a collection of short stories set before the series called Night Flights was published the same year. A prequel series, Fever Crumb, set 600 years before the events of the Quartet, was published between 2009 and 2011. In March 2020, Reeve said, "too much time has passed since I wrote the other books, it's hard to go back to that world" and that he did not intend to publish further books related to the Mortal Engines universe. However in February 2024, Reeve announced the creation of a new Mortal Engines standalone prequel novel, entitled Thunder City, would be released later in the year. This was followed by a second book Bridge of Storms in 2026.

== Title ==
The title is a quotation from Act III, Scene III of William Shakespeare's play Othello ("Othello: And O you mortal engines whose rude throats/Th'immortal Jove's dread clamors counterfeit..." – Line 356/357).

== Plot ==
=== Mortal Engines ===
The book starts with the Traction City of London chasing and catching a small mining town called Salthook. In the "gut" of London, where towns are stripped for resources, Tom Natsworthy, a teenage Apprentice Historian, meets Thaddeus Valentine, the Head of the Guild of Historians, and his daughter Katherine. Hester Shaw, a teenage resident of Salthook, attempts to assassinate Valentine, and escapes through a chute. When Tom informs Valentine of Hester's name, Valentine pushes him into the chute. Tom and Hester recover outside London within the Hunting Ground and follow the city's tracks.

The pair board a small town called Speedwell, where they are drugged to be sold as slaves. Tom and Hester escape and fly with pilot Anna Fang aboard her airship Jenny Haniver to the neutral flying city of Airhaven, where they are attacked by Shrike, a cyborg "Stalker" sent by London Mayor Magnus Crome to kill and retrieve them. Tom and Hester escape in a hot air balloon. Hester reveals that when she was a child, Valentine injured her and killed her parents, after which Shrike took care of her. Desperate to avenge her parents, Hester traveled to London despite Shrike's pleas. Shrike followed but was captured by Crome and used to create more Stalkers for London.

The pair is then again confronted by Shrike, but before he can explain why he wants Hester to die, two chasing towns run him over. Tom and Hester manage to board the pirate town Tunbridge Wheels, which then wrecks on a coral reef and sinks. The surviving pirates mutiny and attempt to execute Tom and Hester, but Shrike intervenes and kills the pirates. He explains that Crome has agreed to resurrect Hester as a Stalker. She agrees to this, but Tom stabs Shrike, shutting him down and saving Hester.

In London, Crome sends Valentine on a "secret mission". Suspicious of her father, Katherine begins investigating events in London with the help of Bevis Pod, an Apprentice Engineer. They discover that Valentine salvaged an ancient weapon called MEDUSA, which the Guild of Engineers has reassembled inside St Paul's Cathedral. MEDUSA is then used to destroy a much larger city pursuing London.

Tom and Hester are rescued by Fang, who is revealed to be an Anti-Traction League agent. Together, they travel to the Shield Wall of Batmunkh Gompa, which protects the League. Fang suspects MEDUSA will be used by London to destroy the Shield Wall. She warns League Governor Khan, insisting that they should bomb London to destroy the weapon, to Tom's horror. Valentine infiltrates Batmunkh Gompa and cripples the League's airship fleet, then kills Fang in a duel and escapes in his airship. Tom and Hester fly back to London to stop Valentine and MEDUSA themselves.

Crome guides London toward the Shield Wall, intending to destroy it with MEDUSA and devour the League's settlements. Disillusioned and horrified by the weapon's destructive power, Katherine and Bevis conspire to destroy MEDUSA. They are caught and Bevis is shot by the Engineers, but they escape with aid from the Guild of Historians. Katherine travels up to St Paul's Cathedral, with Bevis disguised as her captor. Tom and Hester arrive, and Hester attempts to fight her way to Valentine and avenge her parents. Following an airship battle above London, Bevis is killed and Katherine reaches the cathedral. Inside, Valentine attempts to kill Hester, but Katherine jumps in the way and is fatally wounded. She falls onto a keyboard, causing MEDUSA to malfunction. Katherine dies before Valentine and Hester can get her to Tom for help.

Hester leaves with Tom in the airship while Valentine chooses to stay behind in London. MEDUSA misfires, obliterating most of the city and killing Valentine. Hester comforts a grief-stricken Tom as they fly away in the Jenny Haniver, apparently the only survivors.

=== Predator's Gold ===
Aboard Airhaven, Tom and Hester are joined by adventurer and author Nimrod Pennyroyal. They are soon pursued by the Green Storm, a fanatical splinter group of the Anti-Traction League, who seek the Jenny Haniver, which they believe was stolen from their deceased leader, Anna Fang. Despite evading the airships, Jenny Haniver is damaged above the Ice Wastes. They are rescued by Anchorage, a once-thriving Traction City ruled by Freya Rasmussen, who appoints Pennyroyal as chief navigator because of his purported experience traveling in North America, the city's destination. Hester becomes jealous of Tom's growing closeness to Freya, and is disturbed by sightings of "ghosts" in the city. Eventually she sees Tom kissing Freya, and leaves the city in the repaired Jenny Haniver. Hester sells Anchorage's course to Piotr Masgard, leader of the "Huntsmen" of the Traction City of Arkangel, who intends to capture the city through an airship invasion. As payment, she insists that Tom be returned to her after the capture.

Hester is then kidnapped by a Green Storm informant and taken to Rogue's Roost, where the Green Storm have converted Anna Fang's body into a Stalker. Sathya, the Green Storm commander, hopes Hester's presence will restore Fang's memories, but the resurrected Fang does not recognise herself or Hester. Sathya reveals that Hester's father was Thaddeus Valentine.

Tom realizes that Pennyroyal never went to America, but instead based his claims on an old map from the Reykjavík library. Tom also discovers that the "ghosts" are actually thieves operating out of a parasitic submarine-like limpet attached to the bottom of the city, who call themselves the Lost Boys. With their secret discovered, they kidnap Tom and leave for their base, the sunken city of Grimsby. Tom befriends Caul, a Lost Boy who tells him that Grimsby was founded by a man called "Uncle", who keeps the Lost Boys under constant surveillance.

In Grimsby, Uncle enlists Tom in a heist of Rogue's Roost. Tom infiltrates the base but is soon discovered and reunited with Hester in her jail cell. Realising that Uncle sent Tom to die as a diversion, Caul sabotages the operation, saving Tom and Hester. In the confusion, Stalker Fang kills all the remaining Lost Boys. She pursues Tom and Hester, but lets them escape aboard the Jenny Haniver when she seemingly recognises Tom; she then takes command of Green Storm from Sathya.

In Grimsby, Uncle severely beats Caul for his betrayal. He reveals that Fang was once a slave in Arkangel, but Uncle released her out of love. She betrayed him by building an airship and escaping from slavery. Uncle wanted to retrieve and reprogram Fang to become his slave. Caul is saved by a fellow Lost Boy, Gargle, who gives Caul the Reykjavík map.

Freya catches Pennyroyal secretly broadcasting a radio message requesting his rescue, and he admits he lied about traveling to America. Chased by Arkangel, Anchorage is captured by the Huntsmen, who leave it helpless on the ice. Tom and Hester return to the city; Hester liberates the inhabitants, killing Masgard and the Hunstmen in the process, whilst Tom confronts Pennyroyal, who accidentally shoots him in the chest. Pennyroyal then steals the Jenny Haniver and escapes. Arkangel still pursues Anchorage, but becomes trapped over thin ice, and Anchorage drifts out to sea on an ice floe.

Caul returns to Anchorage with the Reykjavík map and convinces the city to continue despite Pennyroyal's fraud. Meanwhile, Pennyroyal escapes to the Hunting Ground and publishes a book reimagining his time in Anchorage with himself as the hero, and Arkangel is evacuated and eventually sinks to the bottom of the ocean. In Asia, the Green Storm, under the leadership of the Stalker Fang, topples the old Anti-Traction League. Anchorage eventually arrives in North America to find it enough parts of it have greenery for them to settle. Hester takes comfort knowing the city is safe, and discovers that she is pregnant.

=== Infernal Devices ===
Sixteen years later, most inhabitants of the now-static city Anchorage-in-Vineland are happy with their new lives, except Wren Natsworthy, the teenage daughter of Tom and Hester. One night, she encounters three Lost Boys—Remora, Fishcake, and their older leader Gargle—who have come to Anchorage in search of the Tin Book, an artifact that contains the activation codes for orbital weapons left over from the Sixty Minute War. Gargle persuades Wren to join them.

Unaware that Gargle intends to sell the Book to the Stalker Fang, Wren steals it from the palace library. Meanwhile, Caul alerts Tom and Hester that Wren is missing. Believing that Wren is in danger, Hester shoots and kills Gargle and Remora. Devastated, Fishcake kidnaps Wren with the intention of taking her to Grimsby, but changes course after receiving an enticing communication from the raft resort of Brighton. Upon arrival at Brighton, the two are enslaved, the communication being a ruse. Nabisco Skhin, owner of the slave trade company, interrogates Fishcake, who reveals the location of Grimsby, prompting Brighton to destroy it with depth charges. Wren convinces Skhin to give them over to Nimrod Pennyroyal, now Mayor of Brighton, whom she can blackmail. When Skhin takes Wren to Cloud 9, Pennyroyal's floating palace above Brighton, she double-crosses Skhin and gives the Tin Book to Pennyroyal.

Tom, Hester, Caul, and Freya travel to Grimsby to save Wren, but upon arriving at the wrecked city, learn from Uncle that Wren is likely in Brighton. Uncle is killed, and Tom and Hester leave to find Wren, whilst Caul and Freya return to Anchorage with the remaining Lost Boys.

At Fang's command, the Green Storm armies extend their borders, starting a war with the Traktionstadtsgesellschaft, an alliance of German-speaking cities. Meanwhile, the Stalker Shrike is 're-resurrected' by Dr. Oenone Zero. Shrike hears Zero confide aloud that she will kill Fang with a mysterious weapon; Shrike prepares to kill her, but finds his programming prevents him from betraying her.

Wren, employed in Pennyroyal's household, befriends fellow slaves Cynthia Twite and Theo Ngoni. Upon arriving in Brighton, Tom meets with Skhin to negotiate Wren's release, but is captured. Skhin plans to use Tom and Wren to expose Pennyroyal as a fraud and sell the Tin Book to the highest bidder. When Wren and Theo steal the Tin Book for Skhin, they discover that Cloud 9 has been set adrift. Hester releases the Lost Boy slaves and kills Skhin's men in the pandemonium. Meanwhile, Fishcake informs Tom that Wren is on Cloud 9.

Cynthia, revealed to be a Green Storm agent, explains to Wren that the Tin Book will help Green Storm defeat the Traktionstadtsgesellschaft. Cynthia takes the Book and holds Wren and Theo at gunpoint, but the two are saved by Pennyroyal. As Skhin attempts to escape Brighton, he shoots Pennyroyal and takes a decoy of the Tin Book, but his airship is destroyed by Stalker-birds.

Wren and Theo are captured by General Naga, Green Storm's second-in-command, and brought before Fang, who takes the real Book and memorizes the codes. Knowing that Fang will kill thousands, Zero commands Shrike to kill Fang. Shrike destroys Fang, scattering her battered pieces across the coastline of Africa. Cloud 9 begins to burn and descend. Tom and Hester recover the Jenny Haniver, whilst Wren and Theo escape with the wounded Pennyroyal. Naga seizes control of Green Storm and leaves Cloud 9 with Zero and other passengers.

Pennyroyal truthfully tells Wren that Hester sold Anchorage to Arkangel, but she doesn't believe him. Hester attempts to kill Pennyroyal to ensure her treachery remains secret, but Wren tells Tom to stop her. Hester flees into the burning wreckage of Cloud 9 in despair, and reunites with Shrike. Tom, Wren, Theo, and Pennyroyal escape in the Jenny Haniver, as Cloud 9 finally collapses onto the African shore. As scavenger towns arrive, Shrike takes Hester's unconscious body into the nearby Sahara Desert. Fishcake, also escaping into the desert, encounters the remains of the Stalker Fang, who asks him to rebuild her, which he agrees to do.

=== A Darkling Plain ===
Six months later, General Naga, now the leader of the Green Storm, has formed a truce with the Traktionstadtsgesellschaft, producing a new era of peace.

Upon returning home to Zagwa, Theo Ngoni foils an assassination attempt on Dr. Oenone Zero. Zero leaves aboard an incognito merchant airship, accompanied by Theo, who hopes to reunite with Wren. En route, the Green Storm spy Cynthia Twite attempts to kill Zero, downs the airship, and escapes. Zero and Theo survive the crash, but Zero is captured by air-trader Napster Varley. Meanwhile, Theo is saved by Hester Shaw and the Stalker Shrike, who then decide to find Zero, as she can revert Shrike's programming "barrier". Cynthia reaches Naga's base in Tienjing and lies to him about Zero's death.

In the Traction City of Peripatetiapolis, Tom Natsworthy discovers he has not long to live. Tom and Wren travel to Murnau, a Traktionstadtsgesellschaft city, where they meet Wolf von Kobold, commander of the burrowing Traction City Harrowbarrow. The three make an expedition to the ruins of London, and discover that survivors of MEDUSA have rebuilt a society there, including a new Traction Town called "New London" which uses magnetic levitation to float above the ground. Wolf slips away, intent on devouring New London's technology to upgrade Harrowbarrow.

Meanwhile in Cairo, the former Lost Boy Fishcake has partially rebuilt the Stalker Fang, though she often malfunctions, alternating between her Anna and Stalker personalities. Fang intends to reactivate ODIN, an orbital weapon, and eventually takes Fishcake to her old home in Erdene Tezh, where she begins to create a device to relay orders to ODIN.

Napster Varely arrives in Airhaven to sell Zero to Traktionstadtsgesellschaft officials. Hester, Theo, and Shrike also arrive, and discover Pennyroyal hiding in Airhaven in disgrace and debt after a newspaper exposed him as a fraud. Seeking to reclaim fame, Pennyroyal rounds up men from Manchester and a fight over Zero ensues. Shrike helps Hester and Zero escape on their airship Shadow Aspect, onto which Pennyroyal also accidentally falls. As war brews between the Green Storm and the Traktionstadtsgesellschaft, Theo separates from the group to reunite with Wren in New London.

Fang fires ODIN on Manchester and other cities, including Tienjing; Naga survives but Cynthia is killed instantly. New London witnesses ODIN from afar, and fears it is a Green Storm superweapon. Wolf hears of Manchester's destruction but continues Harrowbarrow towards London. Next, Fang targets the volcano Zhan Shan with ODIN, triggering a massive eruption. Shrike deduces that the destruction is the work of Fang, so Tom, Hester, and Shrike fly aboard the Jenny Haniver to Erdene Tezh.

Wren and Theo hear Harrowbarrow approaching to devour New London. The Green Storm arrives and attacks; Naga realises his error and defends New London, piloting his airship straight into Harrowbarrow in a kamikaze attack, destroying the city and allowing New London to escape.

Stalker-birds attack the Jenny Haniver; Shrike falls out, and the airship downs near Fang's old home, where Hester and Tom leave Pennyroyal tied up. Tom's heart begins to strain and he collapses. The Stalker Fang takes Tom into her house. She explains that she intends to command ODIN to target volcanoes around Earth, which will erupt and trigger volcanic winter; this will kill humanity but "make the world green again". Pennyroyal suddenly enters and kills Fang, who falls onto the ODIN transmitter. As Hester takes Tom outside, they see a twinkling star in the sky and realise that ODIN has destroyed itself. As Pennyroyal and Fishcake escape in a stolen airship, Hester comforts Tom as he dies; she commits suicide shortly afterwards.

Having survived his fall, Shrike arrives at Erdene Tezh and downloads memories from the older part of Fang's brain. Upon finding Tom and Hester's corpses, Shrike shuts down and watches their bodies decompose over the years. He awakens centuries in the future, and encounters village people who considered him to be an old shrine statue. When the villagers ask what he was for, Shrike responds that he is a "Remembering Machine" and shares his story.

== Characters ==
A few of the people in the books are named after places in Devon, where Reeve lives, including Chudleigh, Tamerton Foliot, and the River Plym. In the quartet, Miss Plym and Chudleigh Pomeroy are both in the Guild of Historians, and Tamarton Foliot is an "Alternative" Historian. Both Shrike and Smew are named after birds, and Pennyroyal is named after a flower. Many of the characters are named after ancient (in the context of the books) brands: Windolene Pye, Daz Gravy, Nutella Eisberg, Napster Varley, and Nabisco Shkin for example. Friends of Philip Reeve are also occasionally mentioned in the books as characters; for instance 'Poskitt' is included as a god, clearly referring to Kjartan Poskitt, a friend and the author of books that Reeve has illustrated in the past.

- Hester Shaw – a wild 15-year-old girl. She has copper hair and a grey eye.
- Tom Natsworthy – a 15-year-old boy who is an apprentice Historian at the beginning of the series, and eventually has many diverse adventures across the world. Tom greatly admires the head of Historians, Valentine, and has a strong sense of curiosity.
- Wren Natsworthy – Tom and Hester's daughter who is kidnapped from their home and as a result, finds herself experiencing the same sort of adventures as her parents.
- Theo Ngoni – an African aviator who runs away from his home to join the Green Storm, and later becomes very close to Wren. A former Green Storm tumbler pilot, now a slave aboard Brighton, he later escapes with Wren at the end of Infernal Devices. They are married at the end of the quartet.
- Nimrod Beauregard Pennyroyal – a supposed Historian and author who is actually a fraud. He is selfish, narcissistic, and cowardly, but has a knack for surviving dangerous experiences, and often shares adventures with the Natsworthy family. After surviving the events of A Darkling Plain, Pennyroyal writes a truthful book about what happened, but is ironically rebuffed due to his previous fraudulent actions being revealed.
- Anna Fang – an Asian pilot and former owner of the Jenny Haniver, who is also a leading agent of the Anti-Traction League. She is killed at the end of Mortal Engines, but is resurrected as the Stalker Fang, who overthrows the rulers of the League and installs herself as a military dictator.
- Thaddeus Valentine – a dashing and handsome Historian often idolised by younger Historians, though his less public image involves murder and thievery as an agent of London. He is killed in the destruction of London by MEDUSA. He is, in fact, Hester's biological father.
- Shrike (Grike in the American releases) – an ancient Stalker who raised Hester after her parents were killed.
- Katherine Valentine – Thaddeus Valentine's daughter who, after uncovering her father's dark secret, attempts to stop him with help from Bevis Pod and the Guild of Historians. She is accidentally killed by Thaddeus shortly before the destruction of MEDUSA and London.

== Setting ==
The series is set thousands of years in the future in a time known as the Traction Era, in which Earth has been reduced to a wasteland by a devastating conflict known as the Sixty Minute War. Nations no longer exist except in the lands of the Anti-Traction League, whereas Traction Cities—mobile cities often mounted on caterpillar tracks—are fiercely independent city-states that use giant mechanical jaws to dismantle one another for resources. Trade is mostly accomplished by airship or between mobile cities of roughly equal size (which are thus unable to devour each other). Old-Tech (technology from before the Traction Era, some from the 21st century) is the most sought-after commodity.

=== Locations ===
- The Great Hunting Ground – Consists of Europe and Northern Asia, and is the domain of the Traction Cities. It is a muddy wasteland in which the constant movement of the cities has destroyed all vegetation. The land is identified by city-dwellers as the "Out-Country".
- The Ice Wastes – New name for the Arctic, wherein Traction Cities use iron runners to skate across the ice. In some places, the ice is thin, and they risk falling into the ocean.
- Africa – Africa is split between the Sahara Desert, governed by Traction Cities, and the southern regions, run by Anti-Tractionists. Southern areas of the continent include the static cities of Zagwa and Tibetsi, and the highland area known as the Mountains of the Moon.
- The Dead Continent – North America, supposedly reduced to an irradiated wasteland by the Sixty Minute War. In Predator's Gold, it is proven not to be completely dead; in the north there are forests with some animals that survived the Sixty Minute War.
- Asia – The stronghold of the Anti-Traction League. Eastern China is evidently eradicated by the War and the Himalayas serve as the center for Anti-Tractionist civilization, where the mountains make it impossible for mobile cities to approach.
- Nuevo Maya – New name for South America, severed from North America when "slow bombs" destroyed Central America during the war. Static settlements rule the Andes, but the lowlands are filled with ziggurat Traction Cities. Protagonists Tom and Hester visit Nuevo Maya between the first two books, but it is never visited in the text of the books.
- Antarctica – Mentioned only once and evidently the domain of oil drilling Traction Cities. Tom and Hester visit Antarctica between the first two books, but it is not described in the text of the books.
- Anchorage-in-Vineland – The static and stable version of the Traction City of Anchorage which had decided to stop wandering the Arctic wastes and settle in a rare pocket of green and unspoiled land in Vineland (in North America). When Anchorage was a Traction City, it was not predatory but chose to gain its wealth by trading with other cities.

=== Traction Cities ===
Some Traction Cities bear present-day names, but some, such as Airhaven and Motoropolis, are invented. All Traction Cities consist of several 'tiers' fixed to a huge hull containing engine rooms, storage hangars, and a large "gut" where captured towns are dismantled. At the sides are enormous tracks or wheels; and huge hydraulic "jaws" at the bows to capture smaller towns. Named Traction Cities in the series include:

- Bayreuth
- Benghazi
- Brighton
- Speedwell
- Murnau
- Arkangel
- Anchorage ("Anchorage-in-Vineland" after conversion to stationary)
- Airhaven (converted to floating city)
- Cairo
- Kom Ombo
- London
- Manchester
- Salthook
- Helsinki
- Peripatetiopolis

=== Airships ===
Airships in the quartet carry unusual or quirky names reminiscent of the style of the names of ships in Iain M. Banks' Culture series.

- Jenny Haniver – named for the carcass of a dried-out skate or ray resembling a demon (this ship is later renamed the Arctic Roll)
- 13th Floor Elevator – from the band of similar name
- Invisible Worm – a reference to William Blake's poem "The Sick Rose" (also known as the Screw Worm)
- Aerymouse – archaic name for a bat
- Idiot Wind – a Bob Dylan song on the album Blood on the Tracks
- My Shirona – from the hit single by The Knack
- Mokele Mbembe – a cryptid of the Congo Basin
- Garden Aeroplane Trap – a surrealist painting by Max Ernst
- Zainab – several women in Islamic history
- Group Captain Mandrake – one of the main characters in the film Dr. Strangelove
- Clear Air Turbulence – also the name of a 1976 album by Ian Gillan and a ship in Consider Phlebas
- Temporary Blip
- Plum Blossom Spring
- Die Leiden des Jungen Werther
- Shadow Aspect
- Protecting Veil
- Hungry Ghost
- Combat Wombat

=== MEDUSA and ODIN ===
MEDUSA is an ancient superweapon, a remnant of the Sixty Minute War. It is a major feature of the first book in the series, as Historians in London have found the plans for the weapon, which is then reconstructed in London's Saint Paul's Cathedral and used against the city's enemies. It is alluded to be an energy beam that radiates from the weapon's firing head. Some people disliked the weapon, calling it wasteful, as nothing can be salvaged after MEDUSA obliterates a target.

ODIN (Orbital Defence Initiative) is an orbital satellite weapon that features in Infernal Devices and A Darkling Plain. A powerful remnant of the Sixty Minute War, it was built as part of the arms race between the American Empire and Greater China. ODIN and MEDUSA are the only superweapons known to have survived until the events of the series, although there are several references to other orbital superweapons (such as Diamond Bat, Jinju 14, and the Nine Sisters). These other orbital weapons are hinted to have broken up over time and fallen from the sky.

ODIN is more powerful than MEDUSA and is able to hit any target on the surface of the earth. It is an American satellite, as the code for controlling the satellite comes off an American submarine, and it briefly searches for the American cities it was placed in orbit to defend after it is reawakened by the Stalker Fang. ODIN is an energy weapon that converts a small nuclear bomb into a directed incinerating beam (a weapon concept similar to the Strategic Defense Initiative's Project Excalibur). This has the power to exterminate cities (both traction and static) and provoke volcanic eruptions. Its beam can be seen for very long distances and seems to interfere with the mechanical minds of Stalkers. Only Shrike's Old-Tech Stalker brain has the mettle to withstand this, although he goes into a fit-like state; it is hinted that he is saved by Dr. Oenone Zero. Anna Fang is unaffected. Other Stalkers lose all power.

The Tin Book, copied from a US Military document recovered via submarine by the refugees of the original Anchorage, is a codebook for controlling ODIN. It is stolen by the Lost Boys and, later, Brighton. It then falls into the hands of the Stalker Fang, who memorises its contents and then leaves it to be destroyed on Cloud 9. The book is burned in a fire. When Fang is rebuilt by Fishcake in A Darkling Plain, she has a double personality; after developing a transmitter to communicate with ODIN, her Stalker alter-ego takes control until the final scene, when a final confrontation from Tom brings Anna to the fore once more and she orders ODIN to turn its beam weapon upon itself, destroying it completely.

As well as its immensely powerful weaponry, ODIN appears to show signs of intelligence. When it is awakened, it queries its new position and briefly searches for its old masters, and notes the vast difference in geography since its last awakening. It can also zoom in to an individual's face on the Earth and, although the picture is grainy, it is still identifiable. It can change its orbit when directed to target all over the globe. This, as well as the Stalker minds found among Old-Tech (and Shrike), seems to prove that robots had, by the time of the Sixty Minute War, achieved sentience.

== Related works ==
=== Fever Crumb Series ===
The Fever Crumb Series is a second series of novels set centuries or millennia before the events depicted in the Quartet. The main character is Fever Crumb, a London Engineer who is partially descended from the Scriven, a mutant race of humans. The series also introduced the character Shrike, revealing his origins before he became a Stalker.

The Fever Crumb series also visits many of the locations not depicted in the Mortal Engines Quartet.

=== The Traction Codex ===
The Traction Codex is a fictional reference book set in the world of Mortal Engines, written by Philip Reeve and Jeremy Levett. The Traction Codex has only been published in a digital format, as it was originally available only for the digital version of the Mortal Engines Quartet. The book was later made available as a stand-alone e-book.

Reeve expressed his wishes to publish it in the form of a paper book, with additional illustrations and information. This was finally realised with the release of The Illustrated World of Mortal Engines in November 2018.

=== Traction City ===
Traction City is a short story written for World Book Day 2011. It details the actions of a policeman in the under tiers of London on the hunt for a stalker. A young Anna Fang explores her early life.

This story would later be rewritten as the short story Traction City Blues in the compilation Night Flights.

=== In the Bleak Midwinter ===
In the Bleak Midwinter is a short story published online, written by Philip Reeve and illustrated by Sarah McIntyre, following the young Hester Shaw and Shrike aboard the town of Twyne.

=== Night Flights ===
Night Flights (2018) is a short story collection featuring three short stories about the adventures of Anna Fang. It consists of three short stories: Frozen Heart, Traction City Blues, and Teeth of the Sea.

=== The Illustrated World of Mortal Engines ===
The Illustrated World of Mortal Engines (2018) is a guide to the world of the Traction Era, expanding on The Traction Codex. Written by Philip Reeve and Jeremy Levett and designed by Jamie Gregory, it features illustrations from a variety of artists. Ian McQue and David Wyatt have both also designed covers for the Mortal Engines series. The book also features illustrations by Amir Zand, Rob Turpin, Aedel Fahkrie, and Philip Varbanov, and maps designed by Lowtuff and illustrated by Maxime Plasse.

== Adaptations ==
=== Film ===
In 2009, Peter Jackson, director of the Lord of the Rings trilogy, expressed interest in directing the film adaptations. He ended up producing and co-writing the film adaptation of the first book in the Quartet. The film is directed by Christian Rivers. The movie is based on the novel Mortal Engines and was adapted to screen by Fran Walsh, Philippa Boyens, and Peter Jackson, though its movie universe is different from that of the books. It stars Hugo Weaving, Hera Hilmar, Robert Sheehan, Jihae, Ronan Raftery, Leila George, Patrick Malahide, and Stephen Lang. The film was released in theaters on 6 December 2018, received generally negative reviews and was a commercial failure.

On 18 November 2020, upon being asked whether Mortal Engines would be rebooted for television, Reeve responded that "it would be nice, but it seems unlikely".

=== Video games ===
In an interview with Polygon on 30 October 2018, producer Peter Jackson explained an absence of a game based around the 2018 Mortal Engines movie, saying if that film performs well enough to make a sequel, there will definitely be a videogame to follow.

== Influences ==
Reeve has stated that major influences on the Mortal Engines Quartet include Star Wars and The Lord of the Rings.

== Legacy ==
Critics have suggested that the 2019 Amazon Prime Video series Carnival Row is influenced by the Mortal Engines series of novels, amongst other influences.
