= Natsworthy =

Natsworthy is a surname. Notable people with the surname include:

- Hester Natsworthy, married name of Hester Shaw (character), fictional character from the Mortal Engines series
- Tom Natsworthy, fictional character married to Hester Natsworthy in the Mortal Engines series
