= A Darkling Plain =

2006 young-adult novel by Philip Reeve

- First edition cover
- Author: Philip Reeve
- Language: English/British English
- Series: Mortal Engines Quartet
- Genre: Steampunk, Science fiction, Young adult novel, Futuristic
- Published: 20 March 2006 (Scholastic Press)
- Publication place: United Kingdom Of Great Britain And Northern Ireland
- Media type: Print (hardcover)
- Pages: 544
- ISBN: 0-439-94997-1
- OCLC: 63186123
- Preceded by: Infernal Devices

A Darkling Plain is a young adult steampunk novel that is the fourth and final book in the Mortal Engines Quartet series, written by British author Philip Reeve.

The novel won the 2006 Guardian Children's Fiction Prize and the 2007 Los Angeles Times Book Prize for Young Adult Fiction.

== Setting ==
The book is set six months after Infernal Devices. Wren Natsworthy and her father Tom Natsworthy have taken to the skies in their airship, the Jenny Haniver. After the apparent death of the Stalker Fang at the end of Infernal Devices, General Naga has seized command of the Green Storm and has signed a peace treaty between the Green Storm and the Traktionstadtsgesellschaft, ushering in a new era of peace and trade. Whilst Wren is enjoying life as an aviator, Tom misses Hester, and has been informed by a doctor that his weak heart means he only has a few years left to live. The Lost Boy, Fishcake, is secretly repairing the Stalker Fang, coming to regard her as the mother he never had. Theo Ngoni has returned to Zagwa and rejoined his family.

== Explanation of the novel's title ==
The title is derived from Matthew Arnold's poem Dover Beach. This excerpt of the poem appears at the beginning of the book:

Ah, love, let us be true
To one another! for the world, which seems
To lie before us like a land of dreams,
So various, so beautiful so new,
Hath really neither joy, nor love, nor light,
Nor certitude, nor peace, nor help for pain;
And we are here as on a darkling plain
Swept with confused alarms of struggle and flight
Where ignorant armies clash by night.

— Matthew Arnold, Dover Beach (emphasis added)

This relates to the novel in several ways. The characters are indeed swept about, often against their will, by the "ignorant armies" of the Green Storm and Traktionstadtsgesellschaft, on the "darkling plain" of the Great Hunting Ground.

Reeve references his choice of title himself towards the end of the book when the character Nimrod Pennyroyal writes a book within a book titled Ignorant Armies.

The similarly titled, "As on a Darkling Plain", by Ben Bova in 1972 also takes its title from this poem.

== Plot ==
=== Part One ===
Six months after the events of Infernal Devices, General Naga, now leading the Green Storm following the presumed death of Stalker Fang, has brokered a truce with the Traktionstadtsgesellschaft, ushering in a new era of trade and peace.

Theo Ngoni returns to his hometown of Zagwa to reconnect with his family but thwarts an assassination attempt on Oenone Zero, wife of General Naga, now known as Lady Naga. In town to broker peace between Zagwa and the Green Storm, Zero suspects the attack was orchestrated by Stalker Fang loyalists. To prevent further danger, she arranges transport on a disguised merchant airship to rejoin Naga via an alternate route. Grateful for Theo’s assistance, she invites him along, and he accepts, hoping to find Wren during the journey. During the voyage, Zero’s servant Rohini is revealed as Cynthia Twite, a Green Storm spy who survived, and she attempts to kill Zero. Theo intervenes, but Cynthia escapes, causing the airship to crash. Both survive, but Zero is captured by air trader Napster Varley, who intends to sell her to the Traktionstadtsgesellschaft. Meanwhile, Theo is rescued from slavers by Hester Shaw and the Stalker Shrike, though Shrike’s abilities have been diminished by Zero’s earlier actions. Upon learning of Zero’s capture, Hester and Shrike set out to rescue her, knowing she can remove the "barrier limiting Shrike. When Cynthia reaches Naga’s base in Tienjing, she claims Zero was killed by the Zagwans, but Naga refuses to retaliate against the Tractionists. Cynthia then insinuates herself into a position within Naga’s household.

In the Traction City of Peripatetiapolis, Tom Natsworthy discovers that the bullet that Nimrod Pennyroyal shot him with in Predator's Gold has damaged his heart and he has not long to live, hiding this from his daughter Wren. Tom soon comes across a woman who looks strikingly like Clytie Potts, a London apprentice historian he once knew. When questioned, she tells him that her name is Cruwys Morchard and that she is transporting Old-Tech devices. Unconvinced, Tom and Wren decide to pursue her, travelling on the Jenny Haniver to Murnau, a Traktionstadtsgesellschaft city, where they meet Wolf von Kobold, the son of the Mayor of Murnau and commander of the traction city Harrowbarrow. Wolf believes that the survivors of MEDUSA may still be inside London, and the three agree to make an expedition to London.

Tom and Wren meet Wolf aboard Harrowbarrow, a burrowing Traction City that carries them closer to London. With Wolf in tow, they pilot the Jenny Haniver over the Green Storm border and reach London’s debris field. There, they find MEDUSA survivors who have rebuilt life in the city, now led by Tom’s former boss, Mayor Chudleigh Pomeroy. Garamond, the overly suspicious head of security, convinces Pomeroy to keep them around, worried they might spill the secret about London’s survival. Eventually, Tom, Wren, and Wolf come across a new traction town being built near the ruins, a project that began long before Magnus Crome unleashed MEDUSA. Seeing that “New London” has no wheels, Dr Childermass, the lead engineer, explains it uses Magnetic Levitation to float above the ground, reducing environmental harm. Wolf quietly slips away and returns to Harrowbarrow, plotting to consume New London and claim the technology for his own city.

Elsewhere, former Lost Boy Fishcake has partially rebuilt the Stalker Fang in Cairo. where its personality shifts between the compassionate Anna side and the ruthless Stalker side. Fishcake informs Fang that Cairo is stopping to trade with Lost Boy-controlled Brighton, where they steal a limpet before heading off to Shan Guo, where the Stalker plans to do something “important.” As they travel on foot, Fishcake and Fang reach a remote hermitage where Sathya, a former Green Storm commander and Anna’s old friend, lives in exile. The Anna side of the Stalker refuses to harm Sathya and seeks out Dr Popjoy, the London engineer who brought her back in Predator’s Gold, to remove the Stalker side. Against objections, Fishcake goes with her to Batmunkh Gompa. Before they can find Popjoy, the Stalker side reemerges and orders him to erase the Anna side. Popjoy explains that the brain he implanted in Rogue’s Roost came from an ancient “Remembering Machine” he discovered in the Arctic, meant to preserve nomadic culture. When he learns that Stalker Fang plans to reactivate ODIN (Orbital Defence Initiative), an orbital weapon equally destructive as MEDUSA, he protests—only for her to kill him. Stalker Fang then takes Fishcake with her to Erdene Tezh, her old home.

=== Part Two ===
Napster Varley arrives in Airhaven, which is floating above the Traktionstadtgesellschaft, and unsuccessfully attempts to sell Zero to Wolf's father Kriegsmarschall von Kobold. Hester, Theo and Shrike arrive at the floating city and attempt to buy her from Varley, who asks for an extortionate price which they cannot pay. Hester and Theo discover Pennyroyal hiding in Airhaven in disgrace and debt after a newspaper exposed him as a fraud. Hester takes what remains of his money and heads to Varley's ship to buy Zero, with Theo accidentally mentioning to Pennyroyal about Zero being alive. With this knowledge and seeking to reclaim fame, Pennyroyal rounds up men from Manchester and marches to Varley's ship. Discovering a photograph of Zero that Varley placed on him, von Kobold attempts to rescue her to make further peace with Naga.

Hester's attempt to cheat Varley is discovered and he attacks her, but his abused wife kills him. As Hester and Zero make their way back, von Kobold finds them and helps them. Pennyroyal arrives with the Manchester men and a fight ensues where von Kobold is shot, but survives via his Old-Tech armour. Shrike manages to scare them away and gets Hester and Zero to their airship the Shadow Aspect and escape. Pennyroyal gets into an altercation with a journalist and falls from Airhaven and is assumed dead, but lands in the rigging of the Shadow Aspect. Stalker-birds arrive but escort the airship to a Green Storm air base where they are hailed as heroes. The base is soon attacked by the Traktionstadtsgesellschaft and Harrowbarrow. All escape in an airship heading east except Theo who stays behind to retrieve a letter that Wren sent him, but is seemingly killed by a bomb shell.

Wolf returns to Harrowbarrow and meets with von Kobold and the Mayor of Manchester Adlai Browne. With support from other Traktionstadtsgesellschaft cities, Browne intends to destroy the Green Storm, despite von Kobold wanting peace. In Tienjing, Naga is informed of the Green Storm air base being attacked but does nothing, disheartened by Zero's supposed death. Cynthia has been poisoning his green tea to make him helpless further and fanatically believes that the Stalker Fang will return.

Fishcake and the Stalker Fang, whose personalities seem to be merged, steal Popjoy's air yacht and reach Erdene Tezh and her old home. Inside, she starts to create a device which will relay orders to ODIN.

=== Part Three ===
Theo survives the attack on the airfield and treks east across the plains toward London, where Wren's letter told him she would be; whilst the surviving Green Storm soldiers are transported off to Forward Command, an old traction city where Hester, Shrike and Zero were taken. Theo eventually reaches New London and is reunited with Wren, as well as warning the residents that the war between the Green Storm and the Traktionstadtsgesellschaft has restarted.

ODIN is fired upon Manchester and other cities by the Stalker Fang, killing Browne. Orla Twombley, a pilot formerly from Brighton, observes the destruction and reports to von Kobold in Murnau, telling him and the remaining cities to retreat from a Green Storm weapon. Naga receives communication that Zero is alive, and, realising that Twite has deceived him confronts her. Twite attempts to kill him, but ODIN fires on Tienjing. Naga survives but Twite is killed instantly in the blast.

The residents of New London see the firepower of ODIN from afar, and fearing that it is a Green Storm weapon, make plans to head north when the city is finished. Tom, fearing for Wren, takes the Jenny Haniver to Tienjing, hoping to convince Naga to not use his supposed weapon. Tom leaves a letter to Wren saying his goodbyes and entrusting Theo to take care for her, admitting that he is dying. Wolf hears of Manchester's destruction and is determined to continue on to London, claiming to his underlings that Harrowbarrow's creeping nature will help them survive.

=== Part Four ===
Hester, Shrike, Zero, and Pennyroyal head to Batmunkh Gompa to reunite with Naga, who’s been evacuated there. They learn that both the traction cities and Tienjing have been destroyed, which Shrike figures must be the work of Stalker Fang. Zero plans to speak with Popjoy, the creator of Stalker Fang, hoping he knows how to stop her for good. Meanwhile, Wren finds Tom’s letter and sets out with Theo to follow him, but they’re stopped by Garamond, who suspects them of being Green Storm agents plotting to betray New London. It turns out Pomeroy died in his sleep after Tom left, and Garamond has taken over his role. He arrests Wren and Theo, but Childermass frees them, urging them to flee to a Green Storm settlement. It’s then revealed that Childermass is Bevis Pod’s mother.

En route to Tienjing aboard the Jenny Haniver, Tom is intercepted and taken to Batmunkh Gompa, where Naga interrogates him. Tom pleads with Naga not to deploy the weapon against New London, but Naga, mistaking him for a Traktionstadtsgesellschaft spy, dismisses his pleas. Meanwhile, Hester and her companions arrive at Batmunkh Gompa, where Zero learns of Popjoy’s death. Upon meeting Naga, she is accused of espionage, as he believes London controls the weapon and that Popjoy feigned his death to join them. Naga has her beaten, imprisoned, and orders an assault on London. Pennyroyal informs Hester and Shrike of Zero’s plight, prompting Hester’s fraught reunion with Tom, who reveals Theo is alive and with Wren in London. With Shrike, they escape aboard the Jenny Haniver. The Stalker Fang then uses ODIN to strike Zhan Shan, triggering a volcanic eruption expected to last weeks and devastate numerous provinces. Realising the Stalker Fang has gone to Erdene Tezh, Tom and Hester set course for the location in the Jenny Haniver.

Wren and Theo hear Harrowbarrow closing in to consume New London. Wren boards it while Theo warns the Londoners of the danger. Wren faces Wolf and tricks him into steering Harrowbarrow into an area charged with leftover MEDUSA energy. The Green Storm attacks, but Wolf presses on, having faced them before, though Harrowbarrow is damaged by the lingering energy. Theo boards and reunites with Wren, but the massive city starts moving again. Naga, learning of Harrowbarrow’s approach, realises his mistake and defends New London, which finally moves off, pursued by Harrowbarrow. Wolf confronts Wren and Theo atop Harrowbarrow, but Wren accidentally kills him just as Naga’s airship arrives and rescues them. Naga drops them on New London before ramming his ship into Harrowbarrow in a kamikaze attack, destroying the city and allowing New London to escape.

Meanwhile, aboard the Jenny Haniver, Shrike finds Pennyroyal hiding and ties him up with the others. Stalker-birds attack, badly damaging the ship. Shrike saves them but falls into the mountains. The airship crashes near Fang’s old home, where Hester and Tom abandon Pennyroyal. Fishcake, hearing the crash, confronts them and tries to kill Hester, but the Stalker Fang intervenes. When Fishcake demands she kill them, she strikes him instead, sending him fleeing. Tom collapses from heart strain, and Fang, deciding they’ll die soon enough, takes him inside as Hester follows.

Stalker Fang tells Tom and Hester she destroyed traction cities and Green Storm bases to pit them against each other, buying time to send ODIN a command. This command targets volcanoes worldwide, triggering eruptions that would wipe out humanity in a volcanic winter, but “make the world green again.” Fishcake meets Pennyroyal, and they plot to escape in Popjoy’s sky-yacht, needing the keys around Fang’s neck. Pennyroyal finds an anti-Stalker weapon Hester dropped and heads to the house. Tom tries to convince the Anna side of Fang to destroy ODIN, as she flickers between personalities. Suddenly, Pennyroyal kills Fang, and her body destroys the ODIN transmitter. Tom collapses from another strain, while Pennyroyal grabs the yacht key to try and save him. As Hester carries Tom outside, they spot a star, and she realises Fang had ordered ODIN to self-destruct. Pennyroyal attempts to reach them in the yacht, but Fishcake forces him to leave them behind out of revenge. Hester watches the yacht disappear, comforts Tom as he dies, then takes her own life soon after.

After learning of Naga’s death, Zero becomes leader of the Green Storm and reforms it into the Anti-Traction League. She strikes a peace treaty with von Kobold, ending the fighting and leaving many traction cities stationary. Popjoy’s sky-yacht breaks down near Batmunkh Gompa, prompting Fishcake to abandon Pennyroyal, who returns to Murnau, serves time in debtors’ prison, and writes an honest account of his experiences called Ignorant Armies. Due to his past fraud, it’s never published, and he spends the rest of his life in Peripatetiapolis with an old flame. Fishcake eventually settles at Sathya’s hermitage, raising a family but regretting leaving Hester and Tom in Erdene Tezh, though he trusts in their resourcefulness. A year later, Wren and Theo depart New London for Zagwa to visit Theo’s family. When Airhaven arrives, they use Wolf’s expedition funds to buy a new airship, the Jenny Haniver II, and become air-traders. New London prospers, avoiding predator cities and trading in anti-gravity furniture.

Far away, Shrike wakes and arrives at Erdene Tezh too late, finding only the remains of Stalker Fang. Her Stalker brain is gone, but he salvages memories from the older part of her mind. Soon after, he discovers Tom and Hester’s bodies and almost revives Hester, but changes his mind when he sees they died holding hands. As he gathers them, memories of his own lost children, Ruan and Fern, surface from before he became a Stalker. He buries Tom and Hester on a nearby outcrop, then powers down, silently watching their bodies decay over the years. Time blurs by, an oak tree growing from Hester’s remains, until human figures appear and he slows his perception. Waking from his trance, Shrike finds a forest around him and meets a boy and girl who led him to a village, where he learns he has been treated as an ancient shrine statue, decorated with flowers for luck. The villagers have harnessed Childermass’ anti-gravity machines, and Shrike realises he’s awoken hundreds or even thousands of years in the future. When asked about traction cities, he’s told they’re considered mere fairy tales. When asked his purpose, Shrike replies that he’s a “Remembering Machine,” and begins to tell his story, reciting the opening lines of Mortal Engines:

"It was a dark, blustery day in spring, and the City of London was chasing a small mining town across the dried-up bed of the old North Sea..."

== Literature ==
- Henry Keazor: "'Mortal Engines' und 'Infernal Devices': Architektur- und Technologie-Nostalgie bei Philip Reeve", in: Techniknostalgie und Retrotechnologie, edited by Andreas Böhn and Kurt Möser, Karlsruhe 2010, pp. 129–147
