= The Hobbit: The Battle of the Five Armies (soundtrack) =

Soundtrack album by Howard Shore
- Released: 8 December 2014
- Recorded: 2014
- Studios: Wellington Town Hall, Wellington
- Length: 94:01 (standard); 108:12 (special edition)
- Labels: WaterTower; Decca
- Producers: Howard Shore; Peter Jackson; Fran Walsh; Philippa Boyens

The Hobbit: The Battle of the Five Armies: Original Motion Picture Soundtrack is the soundtrack album to the 2014 film The Hobbit: The Battle of the Five Armies directed by Peter Jackson, which is the third and final instalment in The Hobbit trilogy. The score was composed by Howard Shore and released through WaterTower Music and Decca Records on 8 December 2014, in a two-disc format and in both standard and special edition.

== Background and release ==
Howard Shore recorded the score during September 2014 at the Wellington Town Hall, where The Desolation of Smaug (2013) was recorded. Likewise, Shore further collaborated with the New Zealand Symphony Orchestra, the Wellington University Gamelan orchestra and London Voices, along with soprano vocalist Grace Davidson. Billy Boyd, who played Peregrin Took in The Lord of the Rings, wrote and recorded the song "The Last Goodbye". The soundtrack album for The Battle of the Five Armies was released on 8 December 2014 through WaterTower Music in two-disc formats in both standard and special edition.

== Reception ==
Christian Clemmensen of Filmtracks reviewed: "Middle Earth scores are so superior simply by their basic nature that even the diminished prowess of a work like The Battle of the Five Armies is, like its predecessors, a lock for any serious top-five list of scores from the year. This is the last goodbye for Shore and Middle Earth, and anyone who denigrates these scores due to high expectations needs to be reminded that, in the wake of greatness in The Lord of the Rings, we are extraordinarily lucky to have these subsequent works of art at all." Jonathan Broxton of Movie Music UK wrote "With the conclusion of the Hobbit trilogy it is quite likely that we will never visit Middle Earth again, at least in the company of Jackson or Shore. This is it. We will never again have the anticipation of a new Tolkien-inspired work from the unassuming Canadian, and while I'm more than thankful for the 18 hours or so we do have, I can't help but consider this to be a bittersweet moment, the end of an era. Looking at the direction film music is going, especially in mainstream films, I doubt we will ever hear a score like this again, and so my advice to you all is to savor this. Drink it in. Go there, and go back again, and again, and again."

John Suchet of Classic FM wrote "This album is dominated by the battle music which is necessarily missing the ethereal and haunting qualities of Shore's best music. There's little that's surprising or new about this final instalment, but it's inspiring to revisit the themes and there's much to please the fans. At the end, the Hobbit, Shire and Ring themes all merge together to give a foretaste of what's to come in the Lord of the Rings trilogy, which is chronologically set after The Hobbit." Matt Collar of AllMusic wrote "Once again showcasing his knack for delivering a soundtrack of lyrical mysticism and epic bombast, Shore delves into a layered orchestral sound. As befitting the ever-increasing darkness and danger of The Hobbit storyline, Shore's score for The Battle of Five Armies is full of dramatic, nail-biting moments of rising tension. There are also lyrical, vocal, choral-based sections that recall his Academy Award-winning score to Jackson's Lord of the Rings Trilogy. This is thrilling widescreen film orchestration."

== Track listing ==
=== Standard edition ===
Disc 1
| No. | Title | Length |
|---|---|---|
| 1. | "Fire and Water" | 5:57 |
| 2. | "Shores of the Long Lake" | 4:01 |
| 3. | "Beyond Sorrow and Grief" | 2:50 |
| 4. | "Guardians of the Three" | 5:14 |
| 5. | "The Ruins of Dale" | 3:39 |
| 6. | "The Gathering of the Clouds" | 4:07 |
| 7. | "Mithril" | 3:08 |
| 8. | "Bred for War" | 3:19 |
| 9. | "A Thief in the Night" | 4:14 |
| 10. | "The Clouds Burst" | 4:12 |
| 11. | "Battle for the Mountain" | 4:38 |

Disc 2
| No. | Title | Length |
|---|---|---|
| 1. | "The Darkest Hour" | 5:31 |
| 2. | "Sons of Durin" | 4:23 |
| 3. | "The Fallen" | 4:56 |
| 4. | "Ravenhill" | 5:47 |
| 5. | "To the Death" | 5:13 |
| 6. | "Courage and Wisdom" | 5:09 |
| 7. | "The Return Journey" | 4:16 |
| 8. | "There and Back Again" | 4:19 |
| 9. | "The Last Goodbye" (Written and Performed by Billy Boyd) | 4:05 |
| 10. | "Ironfoot" | 5:03 |

=== Special edition ===
The two-disc special edition contains two bonus tracks and five extended tracks.

Disc 1
| No. | Title | Length |
|---|---|---|
| 1. | "Fire and Water" | 5:57 |
| 2. | "Shores of the Long Lake" | 4:01 |
| 3. | "Beyond Sorrow and Grief" (Extended Version) | 4:11 |
| 4. | "Guardians of the Three" (Extended Version) | 5:47 |
| 5. | "The Ruins of Dale" | 3:39 |
| 6. | "The Gathering of the Clouds" (Extended Version) | 5:52 |
| 7. | "Mithril" | 3:08 |
| 8. | "Bred for War" | 3:19 |
| 9. | "A Thief in the Night" | 4:14 |
| 10. | "The Clouds Burst" | 4:12 |
| 11. | "Battle for the Mountain" | 4:38 |

Disc 2
| No. | Title | Length |
|---|---|---|
| 1. | "The Darkest Hour" | 5:31 |
| 2. | "Sons of Durin" | 4:23 |
| 3. | "The Fallen" | 4:56 |
| 4. | "Ravenhill" | 5:47 |
| 5. | "To the Death" (Extended Version) | 7:22 |
| 6. | "Courage and Wisdom" | 5:09 |
| 7. | "The Return Journey" | 4:16 |
| 8. | "There and Back Again" | 4:19 |
| 9. | "The Last Goodbye" (Written and Performed by Billy Boyd) | 4:05 |
| 10. | "Ironfoot" (Extended Version) | 6:11 |
| 11. | "Dragon-sickness" (Bonus Track) | 3:51 |
| 12. | "Thrain" (Bonus Track) | 3:24 |

== Charts ==
| Chart (2014–15) | Peak position |
|---|---|
| Australian Albums (ARIA) | 74 |
| Australian Classical/Crossover Albums (ARIA) | 1 |
| Austrian Albums (Ö3 Austria) | 35 |
| Belgian Albums (Ultratop Flanders) | 38 |
| Belgian Albums (Ultratop Wallonia) | 83 |
| Dutch Albums (Album Top 100) | 43 |
| German Albums (Offizielle Top 100) | 25 |
| Spanish Albums (Promusicae) | 45 |
| Swiss Albums (Schweizer Hitparade) | 37 |

== Accolades ==
| Organization | Award category | Recipients | Result |
|---|---|---|---|
| Denver Film Critics Society | Best Original Song | Billy Boyd, Philippa Boyens, Fran Walsh | Nominated |
| International Film Music Critics Association | Best Original Score for a Fantasy/Science Fiction/Horror Film | Howard Shore | Nominated |
| Saturn Awards | Best Music | Howard Shore | Nominated |
| Online Whale Awards | Best Music in a Film | Howard Shore | Won |
