= Infernal Devices (Reeve novel) =

2005 young-adult novel by Philip Reeve

- Author: Philip Reeve
- Cover artist: David Frankland
- Language: English/British English
- Series: Mortal Engines Quartet
- Genre: Steampunk, science fiction, young adult novel, futuristic
- Publisher: Scholastic Press
- Publication date: 18 March 2005
- Publication place: United Kingdom
- Media type: Print (hardcover & paperback)
- Pages: 336
- ISBN: 0-439-96393-1
- OCLC: 63136281
- Preceded by: Predator's Gold
- Followed by: A Darkling Plain

Infernal Devices is the third of four novels in Philip Reeve's young adult steampunk series, the Mortal Engines Quartet.

== Setting ==
=== Anchorage ===
The story continues sixteen years after the events of Predator's Gold. The peaceful city of Anchorage is now a static settlement called "Anchorage-in-Vineland" on an island in the Dead Continent. During those peaceful years, Tom and Hester have raised a teenage daughter named Wren Natsworthy.

=== Brighton ===
Brighton is a raft resort city, which is currently sailing in the Atlantic. It is running its own slave trade, influenced by its mayor, Nimrod Pennyroyal.

=== Green Storm ===
Under the Stalker Fang, formerly the famous Anti-Tractionist heroine Anna Fang, and now a resurrected Stalker, the Green Storm has been waging war against the Traction Cities for fourteen years. At first, the Storm seemed to be winning the war against the moving cities. However, the cities began to fight back, and alliances were formed between several cities, including the Traktionstadtsgesellschaft, an alliance of German speaking cities.

The Green Storm has legions of soldiers and undead cyborg Stalkers, fighter airships called "Murasaki Fox Spirits" and "Zhang Chen Hawkmoths", which are vast air destroyers and carriers. Apparently, the Stalker Fang regards her military forces expendable, which makes her unpopular among many other leaders of the Storm. This is evident by the use of "Tumblers" - single-person craft used to ram Traction Cities in kamikaze missions. The Green Storm also has an elite branch of its military called the "Resurrection Corps", who are responsible for resurrecting dead bodies into Stalkers for the war effort.

== Title Explanation ==
The title is probably a reference to the words of the Stalker Fang in Predator's Gold: "...and then we shall release a storm which will rid this world of [the Tractionists'] infernal devices happily ever after forever."

== Plot ==
Sixteen years after the events of Predator's Gold, the former ice city of Anchorage has settled on an island in North America unaffected by the fallout from the Sixty Minute War and has become a static city named Anchorage-in-Vineland. Most of the inhabitants are happy with their new life, but Wren Natsworthy, the teenage daughter of Tom Natsworthy and Hester Shaw, is bored with her life and seeks adventure.

When she sneaks out one night Wren encounters three Lost Boys, Remora, Fishcake and their older leader Gargle; who have come to Anchorage in search of a mysterious Rasmussen family artifact named the Tin Book. The Book, bearing the insignia of the President of the United States of America, contains the activation codes for the final remaining orbital weapons left over from the Sixty Minute War; potentially with firepower far greater than that of MEDUSA, which destroyed the Traction City of London in Mortal Engines. After meeting former Lost Boy now Anchorage resident Caul, who refuses to help him, Gargle persuades Wren to retrieve the Tin Book for him and to join them on their journeys around the world.

Wren begins her mission by asking the now-adult margravine Freya Rasmussen, knowing that the Book is in the palace's library. Freya tells Wren of the Book's origins but explains that no one knows its purpose or meaning. When Wren reports to Gargle he tells her that Nimrod Pennyroyal's book about the time he spent in Anchorage has revealed the Lost Boys' existence to the raft cities that they previously robbed. As a result, the Lost Boys have been forced to loot cities further afield, but most of the Lost Boys' limpets never return. Gargle explains that raft cities have also begun searching for Grimsby and claims the Tin Book contains information that could get the sunken city moving again; but in actuality he intends to sell it to Stalker Fang for protection.

Unaware of Gargle's true intentions, Wren steals the Book and gives it to him, whilst Caul alerts to Tom and Hester that Wren is missing. Hester finds the limpet and, believing that Wren is in danger, shoots and kills Gargle and Remora. Fishcake, devastated by the death of his comrades, kidnaps Wren with the intention of taking her to Grimsby. En route to the sunken city, Fishcake receives a communication from the raft resort of Brighton, claiming that the parents of kidnapped Lost Boys have united to track down their missing children. Fishcake, believing that he will be reunited with his parents and persuaded by Wren who believes her best chance of escape is there, changes course to Brighton.

Arriving at the raft-city pleasure resort, the pair's limpet is captured and the two are taken in as slaves, the communication being a ruse to stop the Lost Boys. The owner of the slave trade company, Nabisco Shkin, intends to sell the two to Traction Cities in Nuevo Maya, but Wren convinces him to give them to Pennyroyal, who is now Mayor of Brighton; due to Wren's knowledge of Anchorage (and thus can expose Pennyroyal's lies). Shkin interrogates Fishcake, who reveals the location of Grimsby, prompting Brighton to change course and destroy it with depth charges. Shkin takes Wren up to Pennyroyal's floating palace above Brighton, Cloud 9. The slave-owner attempts to extort a hefty sum from Pennyroyal for Wren and to have the truth silenced, but Wren suddenly claims that she is a Lost Girl and has never been to Anchorage. She gives Pennyroyal the Tin Book and is employed in his household, to serve as a handmaiden for his overbearing wife Boo-Boo. Shkin, angered by Wren's lie, employs Fishcake to lead him to Anchorage and to enslave everyone there.

Tom and Hester take an old limpet with Caul and Freya to Grimsby to save Wren. When they arrive, they find the wreckage of the sunk city and the bodies of many Lost Boys. The four meet Uncle in his chamber, who informs them that Gargle's limpet hasn't returned and that Wren is likely in Brighton. Uncle seemingly wins Caul back to the Lost Boys, who locks Tom, Hester and Freya up; but Caul later frees them when Uncle is asleep. Uncle eventually discovers them, but is killed when he shoots the balloon holding his monitoring screens and they collapse on him. Tom and Hester take Caul's old limpet to find Wren, whilst Caul and Freya take the remaining Lost Boys back to Anchorage where the pair marry.

Meanwhile, the Stalker Shrike, who was seemingly killed by Tom in Mortal Engines is 're-resurrected' to mark the Stalker Fang's birthday by Dr. Oenone Zero; albeit with his previous memories wiped. Zero is promoted to Fang's Surgeon-Mechanic, though she intends to assassinate the Stalker as revenge for her aviator brother Eno being resurrected into a Stalker. Fang has the Green Storm armies extend their borders via bombing and destroying Traction Cities, starting a war with the Traktionstadtsgesellschaft. Zero is followed by Shrike to a Christian chapel, where she confides aloud that she will kill the Stalker Fang with a mysterious weapon. He prepares to kill her, but cannot bring himself to, nor alert the authorities of her treachery. Shrike realises that Zero has implemented a barrier that disables him from betraying her; but he intends to stop her from assassinating Fang.

Wren makes friends with fellow slave Cynthia Twite and another young African slave, Theo Ngoni, who used to be a Green Storm kamikaze aviator that was captured. Wren plots to escape on Pennyroyal's private sky-yacht the Peewit by enlisting Theo's help, but he refuses. Shkin meets with Pennyroyal's advisor on Old-Tech, Walter Plovery, who explains what the Tin Book contains and orders him to retrieve it for him. The Moon Festival, a time when no city hunts nor eats each other, arrives as Brighton meets a few other cities on the shores of Africa. Plovery is invited to a dinner-party held by Pennyroyal and breaks into the Mayor's office, but is killed by an intruder. Wren and Theo are nearly arrested by Pennyroyal, as she tricked Cloud 9 aviators to refuel the Peewit, but Boo-Boo saves them, falsely believing that Wren and Theo are in love.

Tom and Hester arrive in Brighton, and split up to search for Wren. Hester discovers Pennyroyal's corrupted version of the events of Predator's Gold, including that she sold Anchorage to Arkangel and the renamed exhibited Jenny Haniver. Tom meets with Shkin to negotiate Wren's release but is captured. Shkin plans to use Tom and Wren to expose Pennyroyal as a fraud and retrieve the Tin Book to sell off to the highest bidder. Told by Tom via a note that he was going to the Pepperpot, Shkin's base of operations, Hester plans to release the slaves inside to create a panic.

At the Moon Festival, Shkin confronts Wren and asks her to fetch the Tin Book for him. Wren manages to get Theo's help and discovers a Green Storm Stalker-bird inside the safe. Destroying it and taking the Tin Book, the pair discover that Cloud 9 has been set adrift and that a Green Storm airship is heading toward Brighton. Hester breaks into the Pepperpot and releases the Lost Boy slaves. Fishcake visits Tom in his cell and tells him that Wren is on Cloud 9, and Tom promises to take Fishcake away to live in Anchorage. Tom and Fishcake meet Hester, who kills Shkin's men in the pandemonium.

Zero discovers the Stalker Fang has commanded General Naga, the Green Storm's second-in-command, to destroy Brighton. On board the Requiem Vortex, Fang's personal ship, Shrike finds out that Fang covets the Tin Book, after reading about Anchorage when she wanted to know more about Tom, whom she met at Rogue's Roost in Predator's Gold. Wren discovers that Cynthia is a Green Storm agent, that she killed Plovery, installed the Stalker-bird in the safe and set Cloud 9 adrift; she explains that the Tin Book will help the Green Storm win the war against the Traktionstadtsgesellschaft. Cynthia takes the Tin Book and holds them at gunpoint, but the two are saved by Pennyroyal who knocks Cynthia out. Making their way to the Peewit, they discover Shkin attempting to escape Brighton inside it. Shkin shoots Pennyroyal, seemingly takes the Tin Book and makes off on the Peewit, but the airship is destroyed by Stalker-birds.

Wren and Theo had tricked Shkin into taking a decoy, but are captured by Naga and brought before Fang. Fang takes the Book and memorizes the codes. Zero interrogates the pair, who explain to her what the Book contains. Knowing that Fang will kill thousands with it, Zero commands Shrike to kill Fang; he realises that he is the weapon she spoke of. Shrike manages to seemingly destroy Fang, scattering her battered pieces across the coastline of Africa. Suddenly remembering Hester, Shrike escapes from Naga. As Cloud 9 begins to burn and descend, the Tin Book's pages begin to blacken.

Tom and Hester recover the Jenny Haniver, but Hester leaves Fishcake behind as revenge for taking Wren, despite Tom's pleas to go back for him. Wren and Theo discover Pennyroyal survived his wounds and take him with them as they try to escape. Zero also attempts to escape but is blocked by Naga. Secretly disgusted by Fang's actions in the war and wasting men, Naga commends Zero for orchestrating the Stalker's demise and takes control of the Green Storm. Naga takes Zero and the passengers from Cloud 9 on board the Requiem Vortex and leave.

Pennyroyal tells Wren that Hester sold Anchorage to Arkangel, one of the few elements of his book that was true, but she doesn't believe him. Tom and Hester find the three, and Hester attempts to kill Pennyroyal to make sure that her crime to Anchorage isn't discovered, but Wren tells Tom about what she did to stop her. Hester flees into the burning wreckage of Cloud 9 in despair, where Shrike finds her. Tom, Wren, Theo and Pennyroyal escape in the Jenny Haniver as Cloud 9 finally collapses onto the African shore. As scavenger towns arrive, Shrike takes Hester's unconscious body into the nearby Sahara Desert.

Fishcake, escaping from the Lost Boys, swims to the African coast. Wandering alone on the dunes, he encounters the remains of the Stalker Fang, who asks him to rebuild her, which he agrees to.
