= Mortal Engines (film) =

2018 film by Christian Rivers

- Theatrical release poster
- Directed by: Christian Rivers
- Screenplay by: Fran Walsh; Philippa Boyens; Peter Jackson
- Based on: Mortal Engines by Philip Reeve
- Produced by: Zane Weiner; Amanda Walker; Deborah Forte; Fran Walsh; Peter Jackson
- Starring: Hera Hilmar; Robert Sheehan; Hugo Weaving; Jihae; Ronan Raftery; Leila George; Patrick Malahide; Stephen Lang
- Cinematography: Simon Raby
- Edited by: Jonno Woodford-Robinson
- Music by: Tom Holkenborg
- Production companies: Universal Pictures; MRC; Scholastic Entertainment; Silvertongue Films; Perfect World Pictures; WingNut Films
- Distributed by: Universal Pictures
- Release dates: November 27, 2018 (London premiere); December 6, 2018 (New Zealand); December 14, 2018 (United States)
- Running time: 128 minutes
- Countries: United States; New Zealand; China
- Language: English
- Budget: $100–150 million
- Box office: $85.5 million

Mortal Engines is a 2018 post-apocalyptic steampunk film, based on Philip Reeve's 2001 novel. Directed by Christian Rivers and written by Fran Walsh, Philippa Boyens, and Peter Jackson, it stars Hera Hilmar, Robert Sheehan, Hugo Weaving, Jihae, Ronan Raftery, Leila George, Patrick Malahide, and Stephen Lang. A collaboration between production houses in the United States, New Zealand, and China, the film is set in a post-apocalyptic world where entire cities have been mounted on wheels and motorised, and hunt smaller cities.

Jackson purchased the rights to the book in 2009, but the film languished for several years before being officially announced in 2016. Jackson picked Rivers, who won an Academy Award for Best Visual Effects for his work on Jackson's King Kong, to make his feature-length directorial debut with the project, and also brought on several members of his production teams from The Lord of the Rings and The Hobbit film trilogies. Filming took place from April to July 2017 in New Zealand.

Mortal Engines had its world premiere on November 27, 2018, in London, was theatrically released in New Zealand on December 6, 2018, and in the United States on December 14, 2018. The film received generally negative reviews from critics and is one of the biggest box office bombs of all time, grossing $85 million against a production budget of $100–150 million and losing Universal an estimated $175 million.

== Plot ==
Set more than a thousand years in the future following a cataclysmic conflict known as the Sixty Minute War, the remnants of humankind regroup and form mobile cities, called "Traction Cities". Under a philosophy known as "Municipal Darwinism", larger "predator" cities hunt and absorb smaller settlements in the "Great Hunting Ground", which includes Great Britain and Continental Europe. In opposition, settlements of the "Anti-Traction League" have developed an alternative civilization consisting of "static settlements" (traditional, non-mobile cities) in Asia led by Shan Guo (formerly China), protected by the "Shield Wall". Relics of 21st-century technology such as toasters, computers, and smartphones are valued by historians as "Old-Tech".

The city of London captures a small Bavarian mining town called Salzhaken, absorbing its population and resources, under orders of Lord Mayor Magnus Crome. Tom Natsworthy, an apprentice historian, arrives at London's "Gut" to collect Salzhaken's Old-Tech for London's Museum. Hester Shaw, a masked twenty-something woman among the Salzhakens, attempts to assassinate Thaddeus Valentine, Head of the Guild of Historians, but Tom intervenes, pursuing Hester to a chute. Hester escapes, but not before telling Tom that Valentine murdered Hester's mother and scarred Hester's face. When Tom informs Valentine of this, Valentine pushes Tom down the chute.

Tom and Hester are forced to work together to traverse the Hunting Ground, surviving Southies, Scavs on a night hunt, and finding refuge in a vehicle called Scuttlebug, but the owners lock Hester and Tom in a cell, intending to sell Hester and Tom as slaves. Hester confides that Valentine killed her archaeologist mother Pandora after stealing a piece of Old-Tech that Pandora found in a dig in the Dead Continent of the Americas, while young Hester escaped with a necklace her mother gave her.

Meanwhile, Valentine frees Shrike, a reanimated cyborg known as a "Stalker", from the offshore walking prison Sharkmoor by destroying the prison, to find and kill Hester. At the slave market of Rustwater in the Outlands, Tom and Hester are rescued by Anti-Traction League agent Anna Fang. During the fight, Hester is pursued by Shrike. Hester explains that Shrike had found and raised Hester after escaping Valentine, and Hester promised to let Shrike turn Hester into a Stalker like Shrike, but Hester left after discovering that London had entered the Great Hunting Ground, giving Hester a chance to kill Valentine.

In London, Valentine's good-natured daughter Katherine grows estranged from Valentine, especially after Apprentice Engineer Bevis Pod informs Katherine that Valentine pushed Tom down the chute, and Bevis and Katherine learn Valentine's energy project in the repurposed St Paul's Cathedral is more than it seems.

Hester and Tom travel on Anna's airship, the Jenny Haniver, to the airborne city Airhaven, meeting other Anti-Traction League members. After questioning Hester, Tom realizes Pandora discovered a computer core for MEDUSA, a quantum energy-based superweapon used by the belligerents during the Sixty Minute War to instantly destroy entire cities, albeit shattering the Earth's crust into a thousand pieces that have rearranged the former continents. The Guild of Engineers has stolen the remaining components from Tom's museum workshop and built a MEDUSA under Valentine's orders.

Shrike catches up with Hester, resulting in a fierce skirmish that critically wounds Shrike and destroys Airhaven. Realizing that Hester is in love with Tom, Shrike spares Tom and frees Hester of her promise before perishing. As Hester, Tom, and Anna travel to the Shield Wall of Batmunkh Gompa with the surviving Anti-Tractionists, Valentine kills Crome in a coup and musters support from Londoners by vowing to destroy the Shield Wall with MEDUSA and lead London to a new Hunting Ground in Asia. Anna convinces Shan Guo's Governor Kwan to launch the Anti-Tractionist airship fleet against London, but MEDUSA destroys the fleet and starts blasting a hole through the Shield Wall. After coming upon a stone carving of Medusa, Hester discovers that Pandora's necklace hides a "crash drive", a kill switch for MEDUSA. Hester, Tom, Anna, and the remaining Anti-Tractionists lead a raid against London, braving the city's anti-aircraft guns.

Hester and Anna infiltrate St Paul's, and though Valentine mortally wounds Anna during a sword duel, Hester destroys MEDUSA with the crash drive. In a last-ditch attempt to destroy the Shield Wall, the insane Valentine has his henchmen kill the city's control crew and put the city on full throttle on a collision course with the Wall with no concern for all involved.

With Katherine's help, Tom uses the Jenny Haniver to destroy London's engine. Hester catches and fights Valentine aboard Valentine's airship, where Valentine reveals that he is Hester's father. Tom rescues Hester and shoots down Valentine's ship, which is crushed by London's slowing tracks, killing Valentine. With Valentine dead, the surviving Londoners, now led by Katherine, make peace with the Anti-Tractionists of Shan Guo. As Governor Kwan welcomes the Londoners, Tom and Hester embrace each other and leave in the Jenny Haniver together to see the world.

== Cast ==
- Hera Hilmar as Hester Shaw, a scarred, mask-wearing fugitive assassin with a personal vendetta against Thaddeus Valentine. She was raised by cyborg Shrike.
- Robert Sheehan as Tom Natsworthy, a low-class Apprentice Historian of London thrown out of the city and forced to ally himself with Hester and the resistance as an aviator.
- Hugo Weaving as Thaddeus Valentine, Deputy Lord Mayor, the obsessed archeologist and power-hungry Head of the Guild of Historians.
- Jihae as Anna Fang, a pilot, warrior, and leader of the Anti-Traction League, a resistance group banding against the moving cities devouring Earth's resources.
- Ronan Raftery as Bevis Pod, an Apprentice Engineer whom Katherine befriends.
- Leila George as Katherine Valentine, daughter of Thaddeus Valentine and one of London's elite.
- Patrick Malahide as Magnus Crome, the Lord Mayor of London.
- Stephen Lang as Shrike, a cyborg (the last of an undead battalion of soldiers known as Stalkers, who were war casualties re-animated with machine parts), and Hester's guardian.
- Colin Salmon as Chudleigh Pomeroy, Tom's historian boss.
- Mark Mitchinson as Vambrace, Valentine's henchman.
- Regé-Jean Page as Captain Khora, a Ruh-Shan member and Anti-Traction League aviator.
- Menik Gooneratne as Sathya, a Ruh-Shan member and Anti-Traction League aviator.
- Frankie Adams as Yasmina Rashid, a Ruh-Shan member and Anti-Traction League aviator.
- Leifur Sigurdarson as Nils Lindstrom, a Ruh-Shan member and Anti-Traction League aviator.
- Kahn West as Toa Heke, a Ruh-Shan member and Anti-Traction League aviator.
- Andrew Lees as Herbert Melliphant, an Apprentice Historian and Tom's rival.
- Sophie Cox as Clytie Potts, another key Historian.
- Sarah Peirse as Dr. Twix
- Caren Pistorius as Pandora Shaw, Hester's mother.

In addition, Mortal Engines Quartet author Philip Reeve and his son, Sam, cameo as two Shan Guonese onlookers, while Peter Jackson has an uncredited virtual cameo, as a statue of Sooty Pete, one of London's guards, is made in his likeness.

== Production ==
In December 2009, New Zealand filmmaker Peter Jackson was reported to have begun development of a film based on Philip Reeve's novel Mortal Engines. On October 24, 2016, production started on a feature film to be directed by Christian Rivers, marking his feature-length directorial debut. The script was written by Peter Jackson, Fran Walsh, and Philippa Boyens, while Media Rights Capital and Universal Pictures would be financing the film. Shooting was scheduled to start in March 2017 in Wellington, New Zealand. Producers Zane Weiner and Amanda Walker, who both worked on The Hobbit, spearheaded the New Zealand-based team, along with US-based Deborah Forte.

In February 2017, Robert Sheehan was cast in the film for the lead role alongside Ronan Raftery, while Hera Hilmar was cast as a female lead. In March 2017, more cast was announced including Stephen Lang, Jihae, and newcomer Leila George. Hugo Weaving, Patrick Malahide, Colin Salmon, and Regé-Jean Page joined the film in April 2017. Richard Armitage was offered a role but passed due to scheduling conflicts.

Principal photography on the film began in April 2017, with shooting occurring at Stone Street Studios in Wellington, New Zealand, and was completed in July 2017.

Visual effects were provided by Weta Digital and supervised by Ken McGaugh, Kevin Smith and Luke Millar. Weta designed the moving cities to actual scale in CG, which required building layout "puppets" that represented the different city tiers.

== Release ==
A "major company" had a deal for a tie-in video game. Development began eleven months before the film's release. Rich Gallup served as creative director. The gameplay was based around the player city eating other cities and growing bigger. They abandoned other concepts from Mortal Engines. The project was cancelled because "like, they knew the movie wasn't gonna be good, so they didn't wanna spend money on a game for it." The staff was around 10 people. The project was "3 or 4 months" from completion, with the core gameplay "loop" likely completed.

=== Premiere and theatrical release ===
Mortal Engines had its world premiere at the Empire, Leicester Square in London on November 27, 2018. It was released in New Zealand by Universal Pictures on December 6, 2018, and in the United States on December 14, 2018.

=== Box office ===
Mortal Engines grossed $16 million in the United States and Canada, and $69.5 million in other territories, for a total worldwide gross of $83.7 million, against a production budget of at least $100 million. Deadline Hollywood calculated that the film lost Universal $174.8 million, when factoring together all expenses and revenues, making it a box office bomb.

In the United States and Canada, Mortal Engines was released alongside Spider-Man: Into the Spider-Verse and The Mule, and was initially projected to gross $10–13 million from 3,103 theaters in its opening weekend. After making just $2.8 million on its first day (including $675,000 from Thursday night previews), weekend estimates were lowered to $7 million. It went on to debut to $7.5 million, finishing fifth at the box office. The film fell 77% in its second weekend to $1.7 million, one of the largest drops for a wide release of all time, and finished in 13th when Aquaman, Mary Poppins Returns, and Bumblebee were released during the Christmas holiday.

== Reception ==
=== Critical response ===
On the review aggregator website Rotten Tomatoes, 25% of 189 critics' reviews are positive, with an average rating of 4.9/10. The website's consensus reads: "Mortal Engines has no shortage of eye-catching special effects, but lacks enough high-octane narrative fuel to give this futuristic fantasy sufficient cinematic combustion." Metacritic, which uses a weighted average, assigned the film a score of 44 out of 100, based on 33 critics, indicating "mixed or average" reviews. Audiences polled by CinemaScore gave the film an average grade of "B-" on an A+ to F scale, while PostTrak reported 66% of filmgoers gave it a positive score.

The Guardian's film critic Peter Bradshaw gave the film 2/5 stars, describing it as "steampunk Star Wars, with a bit of low-octane Gilliam and Gaiman on the side". Bradshaw also characterized Mortal Engines as a "tiringly frenetic and derivative fantasy-adventure movie". Similarly, The Daily Telegraph's Tim Robey awarded Mortal Engines 2/5 stars, describing the film as a "mechanical, soulless dystopian theme park ride to nowhere." Variety reviewer Andrew Barker praised Mortal Engines's opening chase sequence but criticized the "unwieldy, baffling, exhausting, and unintentionally hysterical" plot development. While praising the film's emotional depth and Junkie XL's score, Barker compared Mortal Engines unfavorably to other science fiction films such as Cloud Atlas and Valerian and the City of a Thousand Planets.

On the more positive side, New Zealand website Stuff reviewer Graeme Tuckett awarded it four out of five, praising director Christian Rivers for the film's tone, pacing, choreography, sets, and costumes while noting the film's references to other series, including Star Wars, Mad Max, and The City of Lost Children. Sandra Hall of The Sydney Morning Herald praised Peter Jackson for his world-building and Mortal Engines's social, political, and historical commentary, awarding it four out of five. The Hindustan Times's reviewer Rohan Naahar awarded the film three out of five, describing Mortal Engines as a "visually stunning adventure for kids" and praising the film's social and political subtext. IGN reviewer Rafael Motamayor awarded Mortal Engines 7.5 out of 10, praising the film's world-building and visuals while criticizing its "underwhelming" story. Motamayor also praised Stephen Lang's role as Shrike, opining that he injected "some much-needed humanity into an otherwise fully mechanical film."

Ben Kenigsberg of The New York Times observed that the movie borrowed elements from other films including Star Wars, Mad Max, The Matrix, and The Lord of the Rings. David Fear of Rolling Stone described the film adaptation as "a steampunk Frankenstein's monster made from spare parts", giving it 2.5 out of 5. Glenn Kenny of RogerEbert.com awarded the film 1.5 out of 4, describing the film's story pacing as "laughably portentous and kitschy" and likened the film to another box-office bomb, the Wachowskis' Jupiter Ascending. Sandy Schaffer of Screen Rant awarded the film 2.5 out of 5, praising Mortal Engines' world design and visuals, but criticizing what she termed as "its uninspired narrative and ungainly filmmaking".

=== Author's response ===
Philip Reeve, author of the Mortal Engines novels, praised the film, stating: "Christian Rivers has done a fantastic job – a huge, visually awesome action movie with perfect pace and a genuine emotional core ... There are many changes to the characters, world, and story, but it's still fundamentally the same thing."

=== Accolades ===
The film won an award from the Visual Effects Society for its visual effects. At the 17th Visual Effects Society Awards on February 5, 2019, the visual effects team of Matthew Sandoval, James Ogle, Nick Keller, and Sam Tack were honoured in the category of Outstanding Model in a Photoreal or Animated Project for their design of the moving city of London.
