= Christian Rivers =

New Zealand storyboard, visual effects & special effects artist and director

- Born: 1974 (age 51–52); Wellington, New Zealand
- Occupations: Film director; storyboard artist; visual effects supervisor; special effects technician
- Years active: 1992–present

Christian Rivers is a New Zealand storyboard artist, visual effects supervisor, special effects technician, and director. He first met Peter Jackson as a 17-year-old, and storyboarded all of Jackson's films since Braindead. He made his directing debut in the film adaptation of Mortal Engines, and is planning a remake of The Dam Busters, both produced by Peter Jackson.

== Career ==
Rivers started his career by storyboarding Peter Jackson's Braindead right after finishing his secondary education at St Augustine's College, Wanganui. He has since then continued to work for Jackson on storyboards, special effects, visual effects and splinter unit directing on The Hobbit trilogy. On King Kong, he directed the previz of the fight between King Kong and the three V-rexes. The sequence was used as the blueprint for the final version, giving Rivers a direction credit for the scene. For his work on King Kong, he won an Academy Award for Best Visual Effects.

Rivers went on directing his first short film, Feeder, and second unit directing on the 2016 remake of Pete's Dragon.

In December 2009, it was stated that the New Zealand filmmaker Peter Jackson intended to make a movie based on Mortal Engines. On 25 October 2016, Peter Jackson announced that WingNut Films has started work on producing a feature film to be directed by Christian Rivers. The script has been written by Peter Jackson, Fran Walsh and Philippa Boyens. The movie was financed by MRC and Universal, and shooting on Mortal Engines got underway in March 2017 in New Zealand. Producers Zane Weiner and Amanda Walker, who both worked on The Hobbit, will be spearheading the NZ based team, along with Deborah Forte in the US.

The film premiered on 27 November 2018. It premiered worldwide on 14 December 2018, received generally mixed reviews and was a box office bomb.

== Future projects ==
Work on a remake of The Dam Busters, produced by Peter Jackson and directed by first time director Christian Rivers, began in 2008. Jackson said in the mid-1990s that he became interested in remaking the 1955 film, but found that the rights had been bought by Mel Gibson. In 2004, Jackson was contacted by his agent, who said Gibson had dropped the rights. In December 2005, the rights were purchased by David Frost, from the Brickhill family. Stephen Fry wrote the script.

In March 2007, it was announced it will be distributed by Universal Pictures, and StudioCanal. Filming was planned to commence in early 2009, on a budget of US$40 million, although no project specific filming had begun by May 2009. The project was delayed because Jackson decided to make The Hobbit.

Weta Workshop was making the models and special effects for the film and had made 10 life size Lancaster bombers. Fry said Wing Commander Guy Gibson's dog "Nigger" will be called "Digger" in the remake so as to avoid controversy, despite the historical inaccuracy. Les Munro, a pilot in the strike team, joined the production crew in Masterton as technical advisor. Jackson was also to use newly declassified War Office documents to ensure the authenticity of the film.

After Munro died in August 2015, Phil Bonner of the Lincolnshire Aviation Heritage Centre said he still thinks Jackson will eventually make the film, citing Jackson's passion for aviation. Jackson said, "There is only a limited span I can abide, of people driving me nuts asking me when I'm going to do that project. So I'll have to do it. I want to, actually, it's one of the truly great true stories of the Second World War, a wonderful, wonderful story."

== Filmography ==
- Braindead (1992) – Storyboard artist & Special effects technician
- Heavenly Creatures (1994) – Storyboard artist
- Hercules and the Lost Kingdom (1994) – Special effects technician, as Christian Rivers
- The Frighteners (1996) – Storyboard artist
- Contact (1997) – Digital artist
- The Lord of the Rings: The Fellowship of the Ring (2001) – Visual effects supervisor & Assistant art director, uncredited
- The Lord of the Rings: The Two Towers (2002) – Visual effects supervisor
- The Lord of the Rings: The Return of the King (2003) – Visual effects supervisor
- King Kong (2005) – Animation director & Visual effects supervisor
- The Chronicles of Narnia: The Lion, the Witch and the Wardrobe (2005) – Sculptor/Designer
- The Water Horse: Legend of the Deep (2007) - Visual creative consultant
- Diagnosis: Death (2009) – Special effects technician & Visual effects supervisor
- The Lovely Bones (2009) – Visual effects supervisor
- The Warrior's Way (2010) – Visual effects supervisor
- The Hobbit: An Unexpected Journey (2012) – Splinter unit director & Visual effects supervisor
- The Hobbit: The Desolation of Smaug (2013) – Splinter unit director
- The Hobbit: The Battle of the Five Armies (2014) – Splinter unit director
- Feeder (Short film) (2015) – Director & Storyboard artist
- Pete's Dragon (2016) – Second unit director
- Mortal Engines (2018) – Director
