= The Lord of the Rings: The Hunt for Gollum =

Upcoming fantasy film

- Directed by: Andy Serkis
- Screenplay by: Fran Walsh; Philippa Boyens; Phoebe Gittins; Arty Papageorgiou
- Based on: Characters created by J. R. R. Tolkien
- Produced by: Peter Jackson; Fran Walsh; Philippa Boyens; Zane Weiner
- Starring: Andy Serkis; Ian McKellen; Kate Winslet; Jamie Dornan; Leo Woodall; Lee Pace; Elijah Wood; Anya Taylor-Joy
- Cinematography: James Friend
- Production companies: New Line Cinema; WingNut Films; The Imaginarium Studios
- Distributed by: Warner Bros. Pictures
- Release date: 17 December 2027
- Countries: New Zealand; United States
- Language: English

The Lord of the Rings: The Hunt for Gollum is an upcoming fantasy film directed by Andy Serkis, written by Fran Walsh, Philippa Boyens, Phoebe Gittins, and Arty Papageorgiou, and based on characters created by J. R. R. Tolkien. Expanding on producer Peter Jackson's The Lord of the Rings (2001–2003) and The Hobbit (2012–2014) film trilogies, it follows Strider's hunt for Gollum between the events of the two trilogies and during the film The Lord of the Rings: The Fellowship of the Ring (2001). Serkis stars as Gollum alongside Ian McKellen, Kate Winslet, Jamie Dornan (Strider), Leo Woodall, Lee Pace, Elijah Wood, and Anya Taylor-Joy.

Development of new films based on the appendices of Tolkien's novel The Lord of the Rings (1954–1955) was announced in February 2023, with Jackson, Walsh, and Boyens returning from the previous films as producers. That October, they approached Serkis—who portrayed Gollum in the trilogies and directed second unit for the Hobbit films—about directing and starring in a new film. His involvement was announced alongside the title in May 2024, when writing was underway. Pre-production started in September 2025 in Wellington, New Zealand, where the previous films were made, with several cast and crew members returning from the trilogies. Additional casting took place through early 2026, and filming is taking place from July to October.

The Lord of the Rings: The Hunt for Gollum is scheduled to be released theatrically by Warner Bros. Pictures in the United States on 17 December 2027.

== Premise ==
The Hunt for Gollum is set between the events of Peter Jackson's The Hobbit (2012–2014) and The Lord of the Rings (2001–2003) film trilogies, and during the events of the film The Lord of the Rings: The Fellowship of the Ring (2001) leading up to the Company of the Ring entering the Mines of Moria. It features the Wizard Gandalf sending the ranger Strider to hunt for the creature Gollum. The film is told from Gollum's perspective.

== Cast ==
- Andy Serkis as Gollum and Sméagol:
  Sméagol is a Hobbit of the Stoor branch whose mind is poisoned by the One Ring, turning him into the wretched creature Gollum. As with The Lord of the Rings (2001–2003) and The Hobbit (2012–2014) film trilogies, Serkis portrays the character via motion capture. He did not need to practice Gollum's distinctive voice because it "never left me... [the character is] indelibly part of my personality now". Serkis was excited to further explore the character as both an actor and director. He and the producers took inspiration from how the film Joker (2019) explores the psychology of its title character while telling a larger story.
- Ian McKellen as Gandalf the Grey: A wandering Wizard who sends Strider to hunt for Gollum
- Kate Winslet as Marigol
- Jamie Dornan as Strider:
  Chief of the Dúnedain rangers who hunts for Gollum. He is later revealed to be Aragorn, heir to the throne of Gondor, but Serkis said this film shows the character at a point in his journey where he "wouldn't think of himself as Aragorn... He's living in the wilderness. He's a doomed lone ranger."
- Leo Woodall as Halvard: A Dúnedain ranger who travels with Strider
- Lee Pace as Thranduil: The Elven king of the Woodland Realm
- Elijah Wood as Frodo Baggins: A young Hobbit who inherits the One Ring from his uncle Bilbo Baggins
- Anya Taylor-Joy as Seren: A Sindar Elf of the Woodland Realm who is trusted by Thranduil

== Production ==
=== Development ===
Warner Bros. Discovery CEO David Zaslav announced in February 2023 that the company had signed a new agreement with Embracer Group's Middle-earth Enterprises—holder of the right to adapt J. R. R. Tolkien's novels The Hobbit (1937) and The Lord of the Rings (1954–1955)—to develop multiple new The Lord of the Rings live-action films. This came after Warner Bros. Pictures and New Line Cinema produced two film trilogies based on Tolkien's works, The Lord of the Rings (2001–2003) and The Hobbit (2012–2014), and while they were expanding the franchise with the animated film The Lord of the Rings: The War of the Rohirrim (2024). Peter Jackson, director and co-writer of the trilogies, and his co-writers Fran Walsh and Philippa Boyens said Warner Bros. and Embracer were keeping them "in the loop" and they were interested in hearing the companies' plans. Boyens said working on The War of the Rohirrim reignited the trio's passion for the world of Middle-earth and showed the potential for more stories to be told based on the appendices of Tolkien's The Lord of the Rings. Warner Bros. Pictures CEOs Michael De Luca and Pamela Abdy brokered the new agreement with Embracer and visited Jackson in New Zealand to re-establish the studio's relationship with him. Industry insiders said Warner Bros. wanted to distance future films from the Amazon series The Lord of the Rings: The Rings of Power (2022–present) and would continue to tell stories set in Tolkien's Third Age, avoiding the series' Second Age setting.

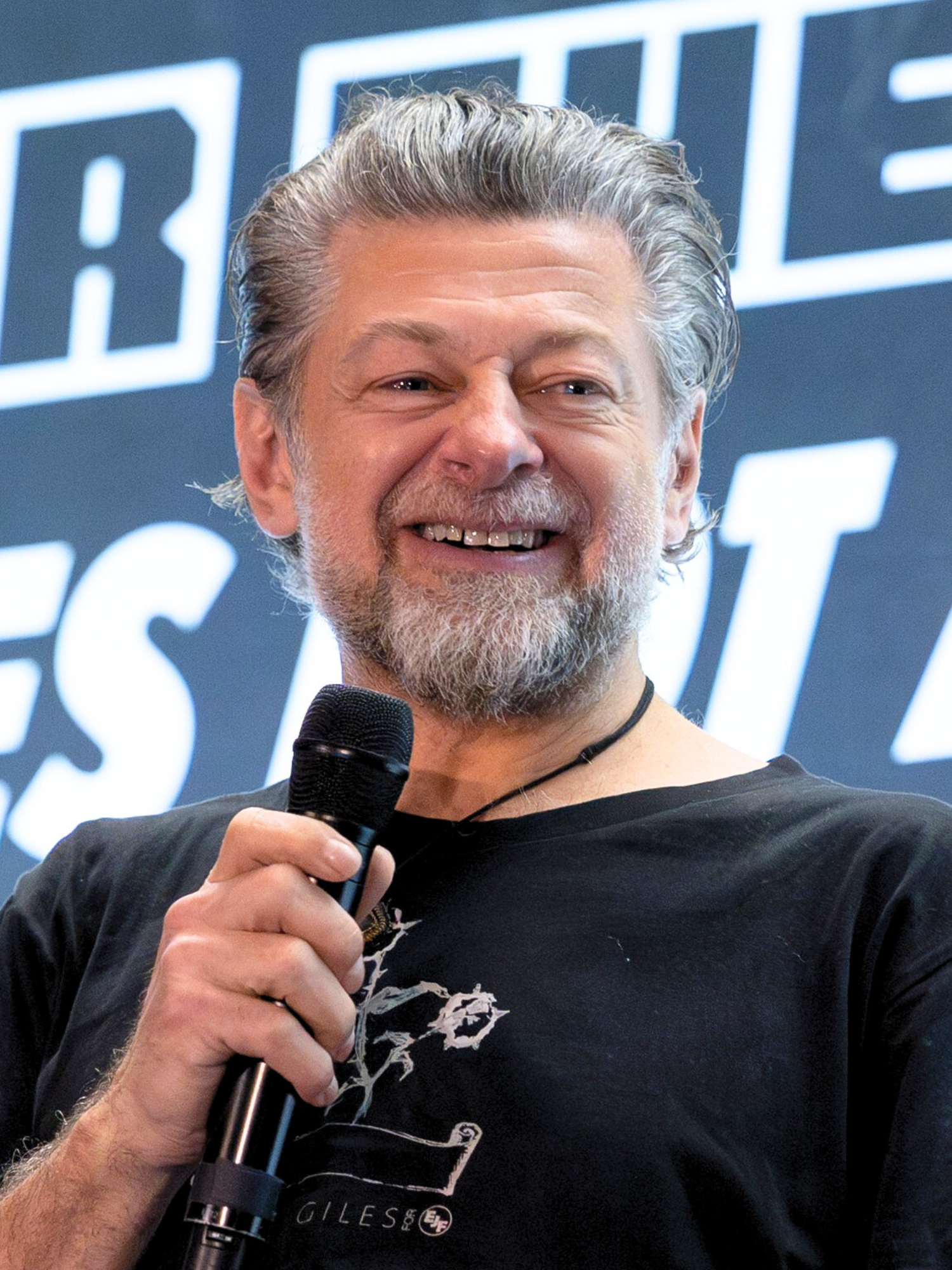
Andy Serkis directs The Hunt for Gollum and reprises his role as the title character from previous films

Andy Serkis, who portrayed Gollum via motion capture in both film trilogies, was asked in March 2023 if he was interested in returning for future films. He said he would if Jackson, Walsh, and Boyens were also returning. Around October of that year, the trio approached Serkis about him directing a new film focused on Gollum. Serkis was a second unit director on the Hobbit films, and he said the opportunity to direct this film was a "dream come true". In May 2024, Zaslav announced that Jackson, Walsh, and Boyens were producing two new The Lord of the Rings films for Warner Bros. and New Line, the first of which had the working title The Lord of the Rings: The Hunt for Gollum and was intended to be released in 2026. Serkis was set to direct and reprise his role as Gollum. Walsh and Boyens were in the early stages of writing the script with The War of the Rohirrim writers Phoebe Gittins, who is Boyens's daughter, and Arty Papageorgiou. Ken Kamins was executive producing with Serkis and Jonathan Cavendish of the Imaginarium Studios. Serkis said the new film was being produced with Wētā Workshop, Wētā FX, and others who worked on the trilogies in New Zealand, and the production was confirmed to again be based in Wellington. This was a relief for local filmmakers after production on The Rings of Power had been moved away from New Zealand. Serkis described the film as "a deep dive where we investigate Gollum's character".

Based on the working title, commentators expected the film to adapt material from the appendices in which the characters Gandalf and Aragorn hunt for Gollum during the events of The Lord of the Rings: The Fellowship of the Ring (2001). Jackson discussed potentially adapting this material when first working on the Lord of the Rings film trilogy in the 1990s, and it was later turned into a fan film, The Hunt for Gollum (2009). Serkis said it was too early to confirm whether any other actors would be reprising their roles from the previous films. Over the following months, several actors expressed interest in returning, including Viggo Mortensen (Aragorn), Ian McKellen (Gandalf), Cate Blanchett (Galadriel), Orlando Bloom (Legolas), John Rhys-Davies (Gimli), and Liv Tyler (Arwen). Hugo Weaving (Elrond) said he was not interested in returning. By the end of 2024, filming was set to begin in early 2026. Boyens described The Hunt for Gollum as a "bridging film" and an origin story for Gollum, covering "a specific chunk of incredible untold story, told through the perspective of this incredible creature"; when making the Hobbit films, the producers initially planned to make a "bridge" film that connected to The Lord of the Rings and told more of Gollum's story, but these plans changed during production. She confirmed that the film would include Gandalf sending Aragorn to hunt for Gollum during the events of The Fellowship of the Ring. The producers hoped McKellen and Mortensen would return, but the actors were waiting to read the script before deciding. Serkis later described the film as being set between the Hobbit and Lord of the Rings trilogies.

In February 2025, Serkis said they were still in the early stages of writing, pre-production would begin later that year and take six or seven months, and filming would take place in 2026. He expected the film would be released around December 2027; a week later, it was scheduled for release on 17 December 2027. In August, Zaslav praised the script and said they were moving forward with it. McKellen said filming would begin in May 2026 and revealed that the character Frodo Baggins, portrayed by Elijah Wood in the previous films, would appear. Wood soon said he had read the script and it had many cameo appearance opportunities.

=== Pre-production ===
Serkis travelled to New Zealand in September 2025 to begin pre-production. In early 2026, McKellen and Wood were reported to be reprising their roles, although Wood said they were not yet allowed to say so officially. Despite this, McKellen confirmed his return and said "I cannot have anybody else play Gandalf". Wood felt the same about another actor playing Frodo, and added that the film was "getting the band back together" and had many of the same department heads as the trilogies. Rumours about additional casting circulated around that time, including that Aragorn would be recast with a younger actor and that Kate Winslet—who starred in Jackson's film Heavenly Creatures (1994)—would join the cast. Winslet's casting as the film's "female lead" was confirmed in March. Serkis and Jackson spent much of 2025 convincing Winslet to move her family from the United Kingdom to New Zealand for the duration of filming so she could join the cast. Zane Weiner had been added to the producing team by that point, returning from the trilogies.

Also in March 2026, several crew members were confirmed to have returned from the trilogies: production designer Dan Hennah, illustrator John Howe, and prosthetics supervisor Gino Acevedo. Additionally, Leo Woodall was rumoured to have been cast as Aragorn, and Anya Taylor-Joy was rumoured to have been cast as Arwen, who was portrayed by Liv Tyler in the previous films. In early April, Serkis confirmed that they were recasting Aragorn. Later that month at CinemaCon, Warner Bros. officially announced the film's cast: Serkis as Gollum / Sméagol; McKellen as Gandalf; Winslet as Marigol; Jamie Dornan as Strider / Aragorn; Woodall as Halvard; Lee Pace as Thranduil, reprising his role from the Hobbit films; and Wood as Frodo. In June, Taylor-Joy was confirmed to be part of the cast, portraying Seren.

=== Filming ===
Principal photography began in July 2026 in Wellington, New Zealand, with James Friend as the cinematographer. The film is taking advantage of improvements in motion capture technology that Wētā FX made with the Planet of the Apes and Avatar franchises, and is also using digital de-aging technology for returning actors, which Boyens called "digital make-up". Serkis wanted to combine new technology with traditional filmmaking techniques, including miniatures and prosthetics, and said the film would "technically, visually, and stylistically" merge Jackson's approaches to the two film trilogies. Filming is expected to continue until October.

== Release ==
The Lord of the Rings: The Hunt for Gollum is scheduled to be released theatrically by Warner Bros. Pictures in the United States on 17 December 2027.
