= Hester Shaw (character) =

Fictional character from the Mortal Engines quartet

Hester Shaw Hester Natsworthy
- First appearance: Mortal Engines
- Last appearance: A Darkling Plain
- Created by: Philip Reeve
- Portrayed by: Hera Hilmar (adult); Poppy Macleod (child)

In-universe information
- Gender: Female
- Family: David Shaw (adoptive father); Pandora Shaw (mother); Thaddeus Valentine (father); Katherine Valentine (half sister); Wren Natsworthy (daughter)
- Significant other: Tom Natsworthy
- Origin: Oak Island
- Age: 15 (Mortal Engines); 17 (Predator's Gold); 33-34 (Infernal Devices/A Darkling Plain); Twenties (film)

Hester Shaw, later known as Hester Natsworthy, is the lead heroine of Philip Reeve's Mortal Engines Quartet.

== Background and life ==
Hester Shaw, aged around fifteen at the beginning of the Quartet, is the daughter of Thaddeus Valentine and Pandora Shaw. She was raised by Shrike.

Hester is portrayed as having copper hair and a gray eye. She has a scar which cut her face from forehead to jaw, a wrenched mouth, a stump nose, and a single eye.

The character's surname comes from Shaugh Prior.

== Role ==
In the first novel of the Mortal Engines Quartet (known in the US as The Hungry City Chronicles), Mortal Engines, her botched assassination attempt on Thaddeus Valentine led to her meeting Tom Natsworthy and set off a chain of events that would change the course of history. She is a key character in each book in the Quartet, often in the center of conflicts that occur. She is the mother of Wren Natsworthy.

== In other media ==
In the Mortal Engines student short film made in 2009, Alyssa Burnett plays Hester. One of her photos in the role has been mistakenly identified as a cosplay.

There is a 28mm figure based on Hester Shaw.

In Mortal Engines, the film adaptation of the first book, Hester is portrayed by Icelandic actress Hera Hilmar as an adult, while the young Hester is played by New Zealand child actress Poppy Macleod. Her scar is heavily toned down, and she is aged to her twenties. Hilmar described her character as challenging to play. Christian Rivers, the director of the film, addressed the fan criticism over Hester's scar, stating that audiences would be "put off the film" if it were more true to the books. The author acknowledged the difference. Reviewers from FilmBook, Screen Rant, and USA Today remarked that this rendition of Hester lacks character development. Other changes include: she lost her mother when she was eight and she fought Valentine aboard his airship.
