= Ronan Raftery =

Irish actor

- Born: Dublin, Ireland
- Occupation: Actor

Ronan Raftery is an Irish actor in television, film and stage.

== Television ==
Year	Title	Role	Notes
2010	Doctors	Carl Leadbetter	Episode: "Day Zero"
2012	Fresh Meat	Dylan Shales	Recurring cast
2012–2015	Moone Boy	Dessie	
2013–2014	Crossing Lines	Colin McConnell	
2018	The Terror	Lt. John Irving	8 episodes
2019	The Rook	Robert Gestalt	Main role; 8 episode miniseries
2022	Gangs of London	Darragh	Episode: S2.E2
2023	Royal Rendezvous	Rory	Television movie
2023	Obituary	Emerson Stafford	Main role; 2 series.
2026	Batman: Caped Crusader	Riddler (voice)	3 episodes

== Film ==
Year	Title	Role	Notes
2011	Captain America: The First Avenger	Army Heckler	
2011	Death of a Superhero	Jeff	
2011	Deleting Emily	Steve	Short film
2014	The Elevator Pitch	Zak Klein / Himself	Short film
2016	The Siege of Jadotville	John Gorman	
2016	Binary	Franky	
2016	Fantastic Beasts and Where to Find Them	Langdon Shaw	
2018	Mortal Engines	Bevis Pod	
2020	Algorithm	Al	Short film

== Theatre ==
Year	Title	Role	Notes	Source
2011–2012	Juno and the Paycock	Jack Boyle's son	Abbey Theatre (National Theatre of Ireland)	
2013	Unscorched	Tom	Finborough Theatre	
2014	The Silver Tassie	Harry Heegan	Royal National Theatre	
2014	The Real Thing	Billy	Roundabout Theatre Company production at the American Airlines Theatre	
2019	Ravens	Boris Spassky	Hampstead Theatre	
