= Mortal Engines =

2001 young-adult novel by Philip Reeve

- Author: Philip Reeve
- Cover artist: David Frankland
- Language: English
- Series: Mortal Engines Quartet
- Genre: Young adult, steampunk, bildungsroman
- Publisher: Scholastic
- Publication date: 16 November 2001
- Publication place: United Kingdom
- Media type: Print (hardback and paperback)
- Pages: 293
- ISBN: 0-439-97943-9
- OCLC: 50714166
- Followed by: Predator's Gold

Mortal Engines is a young adult steampunk novel by Philip Reeve, published by Scholastic UK in 2001. The book focuses on a futuristic, steampunk version of London, now a giant machine striving to survive on a world that is running out of resources.

Mortal Engines is the first book of a series, the Mortal Engines Quartet, published from 2001 to 2006. It has been adapted as a 2018 feature film.

The book won a Nestlé Smarties Book Prize and the 2003 Blue Peter Book Award. It was shortlisted for the 2002 Whitbread Award, the 2004 ALA's Notable Books for Children award and the 2020 Blue Peter Awards 20th anniversary prize.

== Summary ==
=== Setting ===
The book is set in a post-apocalyptic world, ravaged by the "Sixty Minute War", a global conflict so violent it caused massive geological upheaval. To escape earthquakes, volcanic eruptions, and other natural threats, a Nomad leader called Nikola Quercus (known throughout the Quartet as Nicholas Quirke, and revered as a deity) installed massive engines and wheels on London, turning it into the first "Traction City" and enabling it to dismantle (or eat) other cities for resources. The technology rapidly spread and evolved into what is known as "Municipal Darwinism". Although the planet has since become stable, Municipal Darwinism has spread worldwide. Because scientific progress has almost completely halted and much technological and scientific knowledge was lost during the war, "Old Tech" is highly prized and recovered by scavengers and archaeologists. Europe, some of Asia, North Africa, South America, Australia, and the Arctic are dominated by Traction Cities. In contrast, North America - often identified as "the dead continent" due to the extensive destruction it suffered during the war - and the rest of the world is the stronghold of the Anti-Traction League, which seeks to keep cities from moving and thus stop the intense consumption of the planet's remaining resources.

London is the principal Traction City in the novel, which has returned to a Victorian-era society. London's society is divided into four major and several minor Guilds. The Engineers are responsible for maintaining the machines necessary for the survival of London, many of which are found by the Guild of Historians. The Historians are in charge of collecting and preserving highly prized, often dangerous artifacts. The Navigators are responsible for steering and plotting the course of London. The Merchants are in charge of running London's economy. London is officially ruled by an elected Mayor. The Lord Mayor is Magnus Crome, who is also the head of the Guild of Engineers. Like most Traction Cities, London is built on a series of tiers. This encourages the system of social classes, with the wealthier nobles at the top of the city and the lower classes further down, closer to the noise and pollution of the city's massive engines. Atop the whole of London sits St Paul's Cathedral: the only building known to have survived the Sixty Minute War.

== Plot ==
The book starts with the traction city of London chasing and catching a small mining town called Salthook. Tom Natsworthy, a teenage Apprentice Historian, is sent, as punishment for skipping a chore, to the "Gut" of London, where captured Traction cities or towns are stripped of resources. Tom incidentally meets the Head of the Guild of Historians, Thaddeus Valentine, along with his daughter, Katherine. One of Salthook's residents, teenager Hester Shaw, attempts to assassinate Valentine, but Tom interferes and chases her. She reveals a disfiguring scar on her face and claims Valentine caused it, before escaping the London police through a chute. When Tom informs Valentine of her name, Valentine pushes him down into the chute. Tom and Hester recover outside of London within the Hunting Ground and, after an argument, they start following the city's tracks to reboard it.

The pair eventually boards a small town called Speedwell, where the owner Orme Wreyland drugs them and plans to sell the pair as slaves for profit at a trading cluster. Tom and Hester escape from Wreyland, meeting a friendly airship pilot called Anna Fang, who takes them in her airship, the Jenny Haniver, to the neutral flying city of Airhaven, where they can find passage to London. At Airhaven, they are then attacked by a cyborg "Stalker" called Shrike, who was sent after them by the London Mayor Magnus Crome to kill them and bring their bodies to him.

Tom and Hester escape by stealing a hot-air balloon, and drift uncontrollably over the Hunting Ground. Hester reveals that when she was a child, her parents were killed by Valentine as they would not give up an Ancient machine. Valentine then injured her and left her for dead. Hester escaped, and Shrike cared for her for most of her childhood. Despite that Shrike was not supposed to have feelings, he developed a fatherlike bond with her. Wanting to avenge her parents, Hester left Shrike despite his pleas for her to stay, and travelled to London. Shrike followed her, reaching London first, but was captured by Crome and used to create more Stalkers for London.

Hester sees that a London-built scoutship is following them and lowers the balloon onto the Hunting Ground. The scoutship, with Shrike on board, finds the pair, and the Stalker confronts them. Before he can explain why he wants Hester to die, two chasing towns run over him, and Tom and Hester manage to board the second of these, a pirate town called Tunbridge Wheels. The mayor, Chrysler Peavy, who knows Hester from her days with Shrike, frees Tom as he is a resident of London, and Peavy wishes to learn etiquette worthy of a Londoner gentleman. Tom convinces him to free Hester, and Peavy informs them that he plans to consume the downed Airhaven. While charging at it over shallow water, Tunbridge Wheels beaches on a coral reef and sinks; the survivors escape inland with Tom and Hester. Whilst feebly attempting to take Airhaven, Peavy gets stuck in a bog, and his pirate subordinates shoot him, then attempt to execute Tom and Hester, but Shrike intervenes and kills the remaining pirates. Shrike explains to Hester that Crome had agreed to resurrect her as a Stalker similar to him after he brings back her body. She agrees to this, but Tom intervenes by stabbing Shrike in the eye, shutting him down, and saving her life.

Valentine is sent away by Crome on a "secret mission", much to Katherine's dismay. Suspicious of her father, Katherine begins investigating events in London with the help of Apprentice Engineer Bevis Pod, whom she befriends after discovering he witnessed Tom chasing Hester. They discover that Valentine salvaged a monstrous ancient weapon called MEDUSA for London and that the Guild of Engineers had reassembled it inside St Paul's Cathedral. The Cathedral's dome splits open to reveal MEDUSA, which is then used to destroy a much larger city pursuing London.

Tom and Hester are rescued by Fang, who is revealed to be an Anti-Traction League agent and takes them to the Shield Wall of Batmunkh Gompa which protects the nation-state of the League. Fang suspects that the weapon that London has reassembled will be used to destroy the Shield Wall, and warns League Governor Khan of MEDUSA. Khan is skeptical that London will attack, but Fang insists that they should bomb London to destroy the weapon. Convinced that the League will kill innocent people and angry at the idea of destroying his home, Tom storms out and discovers Valentine has infiltrated Batmunkh Gompa as a monk. Tom raises the alarm, but Valentine successfully cripples the League's northern fleet of airships. Valentine duels and kills Fang by stabbing her in the neck, before escaping in his own airship the 13th Floor Elevator. Tom and Hester take the Jenny Haniver and fly it back to London in the hope of stopping Valentine and MEDUSA themselves.

With MEDUSA finally launched, Crome begins guiding London east towards the Anti-Traction League's base behind the Shield Wall of Batmunkh Gompa to destroy their defenses and devour all of their settlements. After Valentine returns, Katherine learns that MEDUSA was originally found by Hester's mother, Pandora and that he had killed her to steal it for London. He also admits that Katherine was likely Hester's half-sister. Disillusioned, and horrified by the destructive power of the weapon, Katherine and Bevis conspire to plant a bomb to destroy MEDUSA but are caught in their attempt.

The Guild of Historians, led by Tom's boss Chudleigh Pomeroy, come to their aid, and battle with the Engineers. Katherine travels up to the Top Tier to Saint Paul's Cathedral, with Bevis disguised as her captor. Tom and Hester arrive, and Hester attempts to fight her way to Valentine to avenge her parents. Tom is attacked by the 13th Floor Elevator above London and shoots it down. Bevis is killed when the airship crushes him, but Katherine is able to reach Saint Paul's Cathedral. Inside, she sees Hester brought before Valentine. When he attempts to kill her, Katherine jumps in her father's way and is fatally wounded. She falls onto a keyboard, interrupting the firing sequence of MEDUSA, and causing it to malfunction. Valentine and Hester, briefly putting aside their differences, try to take Katherine to Tom to get help, but she dies before they can reach him.

Hester leaves with Tom in the airship, while Valentine chooses to stay behind in London. MEDUSA finally misfires, obliterating most of the city and killing Valentine. Hester tries to comfort a grief-stricken Tom as they fly away in the Jenny Haniver, apparently the only survivors of the incident, and make their way to the Bird Roads.

== Characters ==
A few of the people in Mortal Engines are named after places in Devon, where Reeve lives, including Chudleigh, Tamerton Foliot and the River Plym. In the quartet, Miss Plym and Chudleigh Pomeroy are both in the Guild of Historians, and Tamarton Foliot is an "Alternative" historian. Both Shrike and Smew are named after birds, and Pennyroyal is named after a flower.

- Tom Natsworthy, a 15-year-old boy who is a Third-Class Apprentice Historian who is unwittingly brought along with Hester.
- Hester Shaw, a 15-year-old short-tempered assassin whose parents were murdered by Valentine and seeks vengeance.
- Anna Fang, a friendly but deadly aviatrix and Anti-Tractionist agent who rescues Hester and Tom from being sold into slavery.
- Thaddeus Valentine, the dashing and handsome famous archaeologist and Head of the Guild of Historians on London, formerly a scavenger, and father to Katherine.
- Katherine Valentine, Thaddeus Valentine's daughter who begins to become suspicious about her father's activities.
- Bevis Pod, an Apprentice Engineer who assists Katherine in her investigations.
- Shrike (also known in the American release of the series as Grike), an ancient Stalker who raised Hester after her parents were killed and seeks to turn her into a Stalker so she can be with him forever.
- Magnus Crome, the Lord Mayor of London and the Head of the Guild of Engineers, who seeks to make London the greatest traction city in the world by using a mysterious superweapon called MEDUSA.
- Chrysler Peavey, the ambitious pirate mayor of Tunbridge Wheels, who Hester knew before she left Shrike.
- Chudleigh Pomeroy, the Deputy Head of the Guild of Historians and Tom's overzealous boss, who assists Katherine.

== Title ==
The title references Act III, Scene iii of William Shakespeare's play Othello ("Othello: And O you mortall Engines, whose rude throats / Th'immortal Jove's dread clamors, counterfet, / Farewell: Othello's Occupation's gone" – line 352). In the novel, it refers to the fact that the society of Municipal Darwinism is not sustainable living and that the cities' engines are indeed mortal.

== Development ==
Philip Reeve has stated that his plans to write a science fiction novel were laid in the late 1980s.

The original drafts were intended to be an adult novel but after several rejections, Scholastic said they might be interested in Mortal Engines as a children's story. In the refactoring the story was simplified, removing several characters and much content such as the city politics that Reeve thought would not be interesting to children.

The Mortal Engines world was originally written as an alternative universe set in the early 1900s, but Reeve has stated this turned out to require just too much explaining as how and where history could have diverged. He was inspired to start then due to The War of the Worlds.

== Critical reception ==
Publishers Weekly praised the book, calling it "staggering feat of engineering ... [that] ... offers new wonders at every turn".

== Adaptation ==
A film adaptation by Peter Jackson was announced in 2009. In October 2016, Jackson announced that the film would be his next project as producer and co-writer, alongside long-time collaborators Fran Walsh (also his wife) and Philippa Boyens. The film was directed by Jackson's long-time collaborator Christian Rivers.

On 18 November 2020, upon asked whether Mortal Engines would be rebooted for television, Reeve responded that, while that would be nice, it seemed unlikely.

== Legacy ==
Critics have suggested that the 2019 Amazon Prime Video series Carnival Row is influenced by the Mortal Engines series of novels, amongst other influences.

== See also ==
- Mortal Engines Quartet
