= Jihae (musician) =

South Korean actress and musician (born 1974 or 1984)

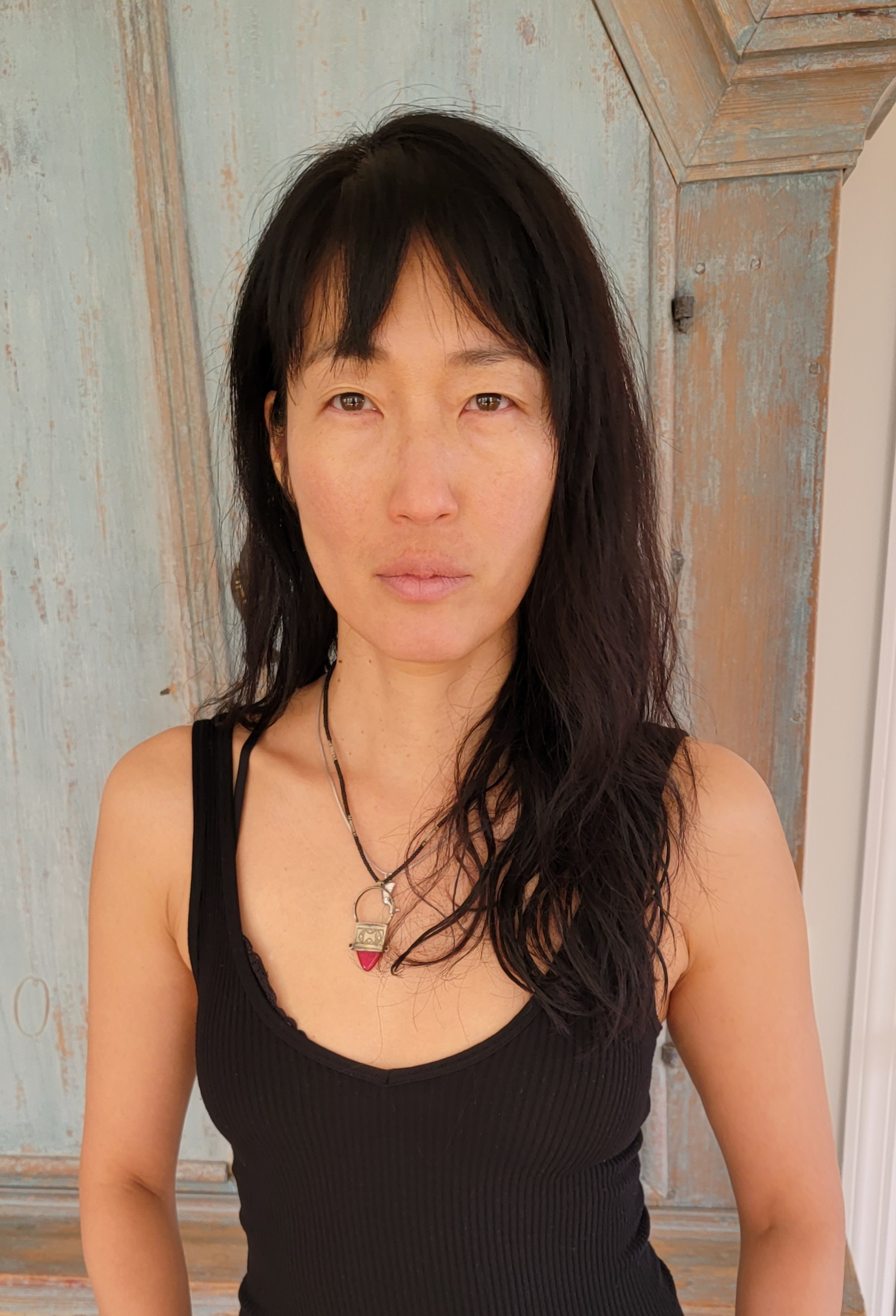
- Jihae in 2023
- Born: Jihae Kim; February 7, 1975 (age 51); Seoul, South Korea
- Occupations: Actress; singer; model
- Years active: 2007–present

Korean name
- Hangul: 김지혜
- RR: Gim Jihye
- MR: Kim Chihye

Jihae Kim (Korean: 김지혜; born February 7, 1975, or 1984), better known by the mononym Jihae, is a Korean-American singer/songwriter, actress and model. She debuted as a singer in 2007 and has since released four full-length albums. As an actress, she has appeared in the miniseries Mars (2016), the film Mortal Engines (2018), the Netflix series Altered Carbon and the HBO series Succession.

== Early life ==
Jihae was born in Seoul, South Korea. As the daughter of a diplomat, she grew up in Nigeria and Sweden. She attended Emory University, where she graduated with a degree in political science.

== Career ==
Jihae began her career as a model, appearing in ads for the women's clothing brand Eileen Fisher.

In 2007, she released her first album, My Heart Is an Elephant. A video for the album featured filmmaker Michel Gondry playing percussion using kitchenware and musician Lenny Kravitz playing the guitar and bass. Jihae released her second album, Elvis is Still Alive, in 2008.

In 2009, Jihae launched her own music label and multimedia company, Septem.

In 2010, Jihae co-created a rock opera, Fire Burning Rain, with Academy Award-winning playwright/director John Patrick Shanley, based on her concept album of the same name. She released her fourth album, Illusion of You, in 2015. She co-produced the album with Dave Stewart of Eurythmics, as well as Stuart Matthewman and Jean-Luc Sinclair. The album includes a song cowritten by Leonard Cohen.

Jihae had her first major acting role in 2015, when she played twin sisters Joon and Hana Seung in the National Geographic miniseries Mars. In 2018, she played Anna Fang in the film Mortal Engines.

== Activism ==
In 2012, Jihae and Dave Stewart recorded the song, "Man to Man, Woman to Woman," which was chosen by then-Secretary of State Hillary Clinton as the theme song for the 2012 Hours Against Hate campaign to combat bigotry. Jihae and Stewart performed the song at a concert in London on July 24.

== Discography ==
=== Studio albums ===
- My Heart Is an Elephant (2007)
- Elvis Is Still Alive (2008)
- Fire Burning Rain (2010)
- Illusion of You (2018)

=== Digital albums ===
- Fire Burning Rain
- My Heart Is An Elephant
- Elvis Is Still Alive
- Illusion of You
- Afterthough

== Filmography ==
=== Film ===
Year	Title	Role	Ref.
2009	2B	Singer (as Jihae Kim)	
2018	Mortal Engines	Anna Fang	
2026	The Last Day	Olivia	

=== Television ===
Year	Title	Role	Ref.
2016–2018	Mars	Joon Seung & Hana Seung	
2020	Altered Carbon	Torch Singer	
2021	Succession	Berry Schneider	
2024	Dune: Prophecy	Kasha Jinjo	
