= Zane Weiner =

American film producer and writer

- Born: Zane David Weiner; 11 July 1953 (age 73); Holyoke, Massachusetts, United States
- Occupations: Film producer and writer
- Years active: 1997–present

Zane David Weiner (born July 11, 1953) is an American film producer most known for his work with director Peter Jackson, serving as production manager for The Lord of the Rings trilogy, and as producer for the three-part The Hobbit film series.

He was a member of the directorial team for the 2003 Directors Guild of America Awards for Outstanding Directorial Achievement in Motion Pictures for The Lord of the Rings: The Return of the King.

== Filmography ==
Weiner has worked in the following films:

Year	Title	Notes
2000	The Crew	
2003	The Lord of the Rings: The Return of the King	Unit Production Manager
2003	The Long and Short of It	Short film
2004	The Polar Express	Production executive; executive in charge Of production (co-showrunner)
2004	The Big Bounce	
2008	Shine a Light	
2012	One for the Money	
2012	The Hobbit: An Unexpected Journey	
2013	The Hobbit: The Desolation of Smaug	producer; appeared as Lake-town Spy
2014	The Hobbit: The Battle of the Five Armies	
2016	American Pastoral	Unit Production Manager
2018	Mortal Engines	
2027	The Lord of the Rings: The Hunt for Gollum	Filming
