= Predator's Gold =

2003 young-adult novel by Philip Reeve

- Author: Philip Reeve
- Cover artist: David Frankland
- Language: English
- Series: Mortal Engines Quartet
- Genre: Steampunk, Adventure novel
- Publisher: Scholastic
- Publication date: 19 September 2003
- Publication place: United Kingdom
- Media type: Print (Hardback & Paperback)
- Pages: 316
- ISBN: 0-439-97734-7
- OCLC: 56642251
- Preceded by: Mortal Engines
- Followed by: Infernal Devices

Predator's Gold, the second book in the Mortal Engines Quartet series, is a young-adult steampunk novel written by Philip Reeve and published in 2003. In the book, Tom and Hester stumble across the ice raft of Anchorage.

== Synopsis ==
=== Setting ===
Predator's Gold is set two years after Mortal Engines. In that time, lovers Tom Natsworthy and Hester Shaw have been using the Jenny Haniver, their deceased comrade Anna Fang's airship, to travel across the world trading and adventuring.

=== Plot summary ===
Tom and Hester meet adventurer and author Nimrod Pennyroyal aboard the Airhaven, a former Traction City that converted to a floating city. Pennyroyal persuades them to take him as a passenger. They are soon pursued by airships of the Green Storm, a fanatical splinter group of the Anti-Traction League, who want the Jenny Haniver as they believe it was stolen from their deceased leader and friend to Tom and Hester, Anna Fang. Despite evading the airships, the Jenny Haniver is damaged and drifts helplessly over the Ice Wastes. They are rescued by Anchorage, which was once a thriving Traction City that relied primarily upon trade, but had recently been devastated by an excavated biological weapon that killed most of the inhabitants.

The survivors have set a course for North America, which is believed to be a radioactive wasteland since the Sixty Minute War. The city is ruled by the young margravine Freya Rasmussen, who treats all three of them as honoured guests and appoints Pennyroyal as the city's chief navigator because of his past experiences (detailed in his book America the Beautiful) traveling in America.

As Anchorage's harbormaster works to repair the Jenny Haniver, Hester becomes jealous of Tom's growing closeness to Freya, and is also disturbed by the sightings of "ghosts" in the city. Eventually she sees Tom kissing Freya, and flies away from the city in the Jenny Haniver. Thereafter, Hester sells Anchorage's course to Piotr Masgard, the leader of the "Huntsmen" of the Traction City of Arkangel, who intends to capture the city through an airship invasion; rather than accepting money as payment for this information, she insists that when Arkangel eats Anchorage, Tom be returned to her. As she returns to the Jenny Haniver, however, she is drugged and kidnapped by a Green Storm informant.

Hester is taken to Rogue's Roost, an island south of Greenland, where the Green Storm have converted Anna Fang's body into a Stalker. The commander, Sathya, hopes to restore Fang's memories by showing her Hester, but the resurrected Fang doesn't recognise her nor herself. Sathya reveals that, according to her intelligence, Hester's father was Thaddeus Valentine.

Tom realizes that Pennyroyal never went to America, and based his entire book on an old explorer's map in the Reykjavík library. On his way to reveal Pennyroyal's deception to the chief engineer, Tom finds out that the "ghosts" sighted around Anchorage are thieves, operating out of a parasitic submarine-like limpet attached to the bottom of the city, who call themselves the Lost Boys and work out of a larger group in the sunken city of Grimsby. With their secret discovered, they kidnap Tom and leave the city. Tom develops a sort of friendship with a reluctant Lost Boy, Caul, on their trip to Grimsby. Caul tells him that the city is ruled by "Uncle", a man who founded it as a base of thieves and keeps the Lost Boys under constant surveillance.

When they arrive in Grimsby, Tom is taken to see Uncle, who tells him there is something valuable in Rogues' Roost which he wants Tom to steal for him. In return, Tom will have the chance to rescue Hester. Tom climbs a ladder up the rocky cliffs to infiltrate the base, but he is soon discovered and reunited with Hester in her cell.

Realising that Uncle sent Tom to die as a diversion, Caul prematurely detonates the charges the Lost Boys were positioning inside the Roost, sabotaging the operation, but saving Tom and Hester. In the confusion, most of the Lost Boys make their way to the chamber where the Stalker Fang is kept, but the Stalker easily kills them all. She then pursues Tom and Hester into the island hangar where the Jenny Haniver is kept, but lets them escape when she seemingly recognises Tom, and then takes command of the Green Storm forces from Sathya.

In Grimsby, after Uncle severely beats Caul for his betrayal, then leaves him to die by hanging, informing the younger man that he knew Anna Fang when he was younger in the process. Fang was a slave in Arkangel, but Uncle began to love her and released her. She betrayed him by building an airship and escaping from slavery. After Uncle was disowned by his family, he built Grimsby to make sure that nobody kept a secret from him ever again. Uncle wanted to retrieve Fang from Rogue's Roost to reprogram her to become his slave. Caul is saved by fellow Lost Boy Gargle, who wanted to repay Caul's kindness to him. Gargle gives Caul the Reykjavik map that Uncle had all along, and sends him back to Anchorage on a limpet.

Freya catches Pennyroyal secretly broadcasting a radio message asking for someone to come and get him off of Anchorage, and he subsequently admits to her that his claims of traveling to America were all lies. Arkangel chases Anchorage, leading to the Huntsmen led by Masgard capturing Anchorage and leaving it helpless on the ice to be eaten. Tom and Hester return to the city, where Pennyroyal has evaded capture. Hester sends Tom to hide, and later liberates the inhabitants, killing Masgard and the Hunstmen in the process. Tom confronts Pennyroyal, who knows that Hester sold Anchorage to Masgard, but doesn't tell Tom. Attempting to scare Tom off, Pennyroyal accidentally shoots Tom in the chest. He then steals the Jenny Haniver and escapes. Arkangel still pursues Anchorage, but becomes trapped over thin ice, leading Anchorage to drift on the ocean on an ice floe.

With the revelation that Pennyroyal is a fraud, the inhabitants lose hope in the salvation of their city, until Caul arrives with the Reykjavik map, and convinces them to continue. Meanwhile, Pennyroyal escapes to the Hunting Ground, and soon publishes a book reimagining the events of Anchorage's flight west, with himself as the hero and exposing the Lost Boys. Arkangel is evacuated and eventually sinks to the bottom of the ocean. In Asia, the Green Storm, under the leadership of the Stalker Fang, topples the old Anti-Traction League. Anchorage eventually makes it to North America, and finds enough parts of it have greenery for them to settle. Tom recovers from his wound, but is still very weak. Hester takes comfort in the knowledge that the city will be secret and safe in this new land, and is pleased to discover that she is pregnant.

== Reviews ==
It was received favourably on Goodreads.
