= Philippa Boyens =

New Zealand screenwriter

Philippa Boyens MNZM
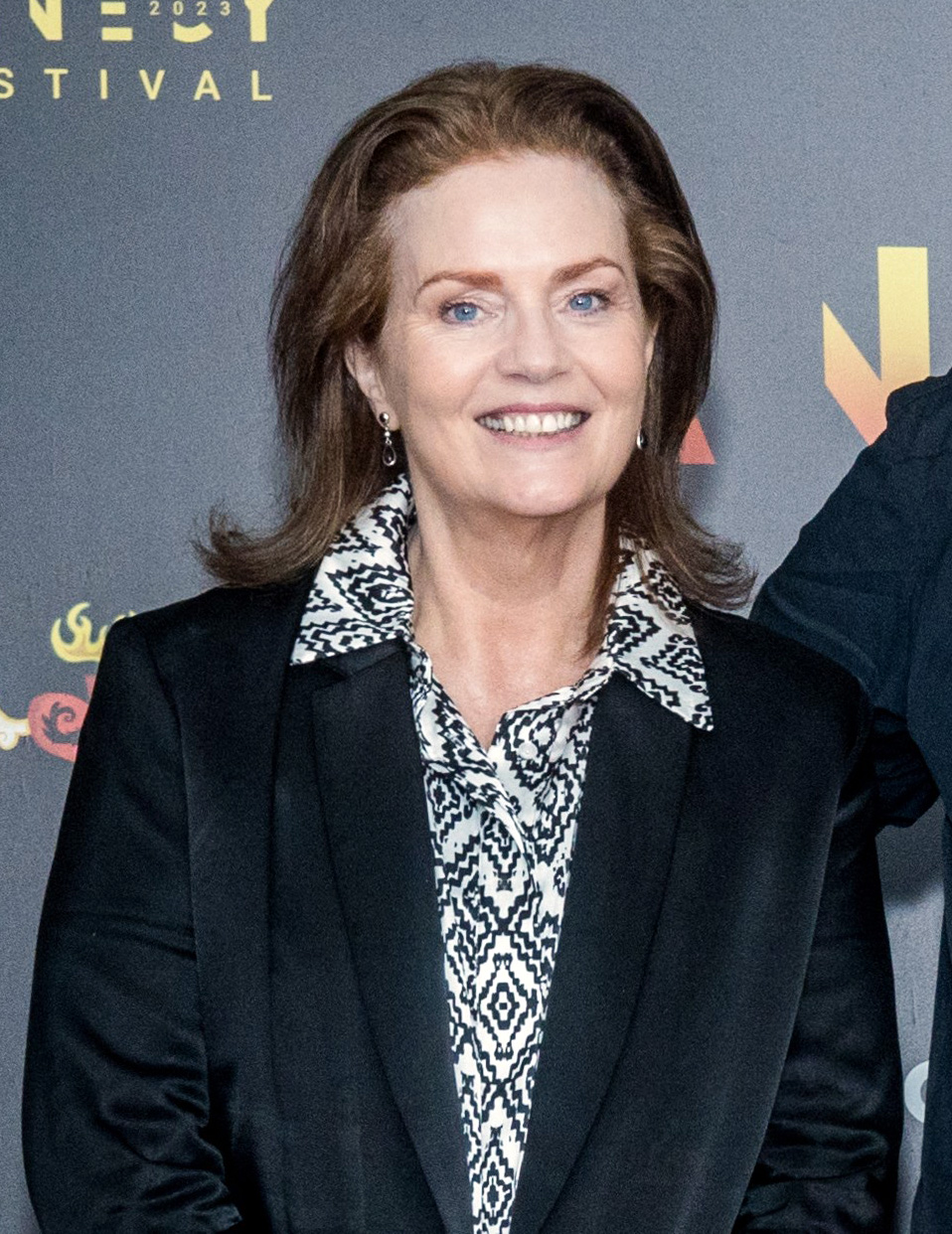
- Boyens in 2023
- Born: Philippa Jane Boyens; 1962 (age 63–64); Auckland, New Zealand
- Education: University of Auckland (BA)
- Occupations: Screenwriter; producer
- Years active: 2001–present
- Spouse: Paul Gittins
- Children: 3

Philippa Jane Boyens MNZM (born 1963) is a New Zealand screenwriter who co-wrote the screenplay for The Lord of the Rings series, King Kong, The Lovely Bones, and the three-part film series The Hobbit.

== Biography ==
Born in 1962, Boyens is the daughter of John Fraser Boyens and Jane Moana Menhennet. She was educated at Massey High School, and was later a part-time student at the University of Auckland, graduating with a BA in English and history in 1994. After that Boyens joined a theatre company and her wages were paid by the government in a PEP scheme.

Boyens received a Distinguished Alumni Award from the University and Auckland in 2006.

Boyens co-wrote the screenplay for Peter Jackson's films The Lord of the Rings series, King Kong, The Lovely Bones, and the three-part film The Hobbit, all with Jackson and Fran Walsh.

Boyens, Jackson, and Walsh won the Academy Award for Best Adapted Screenplay for The Lord of the Rings: The Return of the King at the 76th Academy Awards in 2004. She was co-producer on every one of Jackson's films since King Kong, and on District 9. Prior to screenwriting, Boyens worked in theatre as a playwright, teacher, producer, and editor.

Boyens was director of the New Zealand Writers Guild for a time.

== Work on Lord of the Rings ==
Boyens first became a Tolkien fan as a child. When she came on board to help the writing team on The Lord of the Rings, she had already read the book seven times.

== Personal life ==
Boyens has three children, Phoebe and Calum Gittins, whose father is actor Paul Gittins, and Isaac Miller. All have worked as actors on screen on movies Boyens has been involved in: Phoebe Gittins as a Hobbit in The Lord of the Rings: The Fellowship of the Ring, in The Lovely Bones, and in the Prancing Pony in The Hobbit: The Desolation of Smaug; Calum Gittins appeared as Haleth in The Lord of the Rings: The Two Towers; and Isaac Miller appeared as a young Hobbit in a flashback of the Old Took's party in the extended edition of The Hobbit: An Unexpected Journey.

== Filmography ==
Year	Title	Writer	Producer	Soundtrack writer
2001	The Lord of the Rings: The Fellowship of the Ring	Yes	No	
2002	The Lord of the Rings: The Two Towers	Yes	No	
2003	The Lord of the Rings: The Return of the King	Yes	No	"The Edge of Night", "The Green Dragon"
2005	Peter Jackson's King Kong: The Official Game of the Movie	Yes	No	Also voice-over director
2005	King Kong	Yes	Co-producer	
2009	District 9	No	Co-producer	
2009	The Lovely Bones	Yes	Co-producer	
2012	The Hobbit: An Unexpected Journey	Yes	Co-producer	
2013	The Hobbit: The Desolation of Smaug	Yes	Co-producer	
2014	The Hobbit: The Battle of the Five Armies	Yes	Co-producer	
2018	Mortal Engines	Yes	No	
2024	The Lord of the Rings: The War of the Rohirrim	Story	Yes	
2027	The Lord of the Rings: The Hunt for Gollum	Yes	Yes	Filming

== Awards ==
In the 2004 Queen's Birthday Honours, Boyens was appointed a Member of the New Zealand Order of Merit, for services to film.
