= Fran Walsh =

New Zealand screenwriter and producer (born 1959)

Dame Fran Walsh DNZM
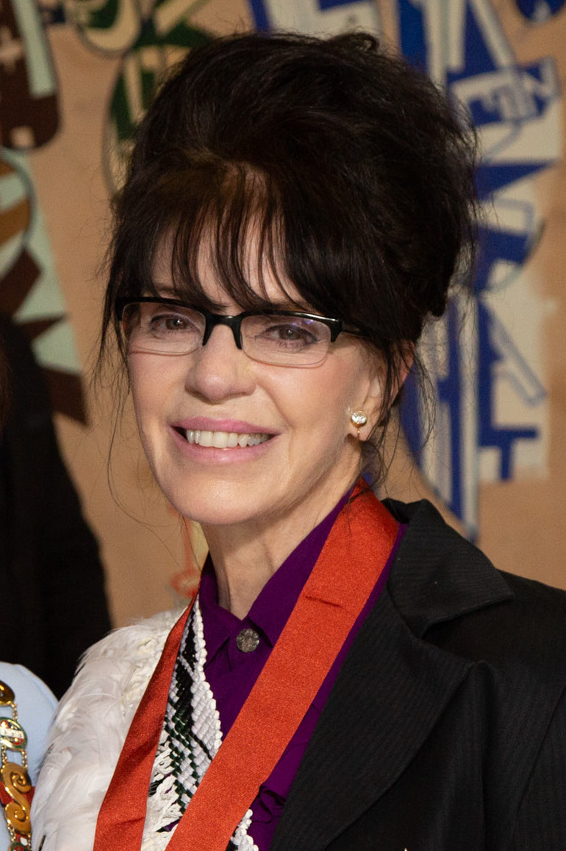
- Walsh in 2019
- Born: Frances Rosemary Walsh; 10 January 1959 (age 67); Wellington, New Zealand
- Occupations: Screenwriter, film producer, lyricist
- Years active: 1983–present
- Partner: Peter Jackson (1987–present)
- Children: 2

Dame Frances Rosemary Walsh DNZM (born 10 January 1959) is a New Zealand screenwriter and film producer.

The partner of filmmaker Peter Jackson, Walsh has contributed to all of their films since 1989: as co-writer since Meet the Feebles, and as producer since the Lord of the Rings trilogy. She won three Academy Awards for the final film of the trilogy, The Lord of the Rings: The Return of the King.

Together, with her partner Peter Jackson, Walsh was named fifth richest on the 2025 NBR Rich List in New Zealand. Together their estimated net worth is $2.6 billion NZD.

== Early life ==
Walsh was born into a family of Irish descent in Wellington, New Zealand. She attended Wellington Girls' College intent on becoming a fashion designer, but eventually became interested in music instead. Occasionally taking time off to perform in a punk band named The Wallsockets, she attended Victoria University of Wellington majoring in English literature and graduating in 1981.

== Career ==
Walsh got her screen break writing material for New Zealand producer Grahame McLean on 1983 television film A Woman of Good Character (It's Lizzie to those Close). Later she wrote scripts for his TV show Worzel Gummidge Down Under.

Walsh met Peter Jackson in the mid-1980s during the final stages of production on his low-budget movie Bad Taste, in which aliens serve humans as fast food. Walsh has collaborated with Jackson on the scripts of all his subsequent films, after joining the writing quartet on his next film, the dark comedy Meet the Feebles (1989). The couple then reteamed with writer Stephen Sinclair on the horror-comedy film that they had begun writing before Feebles, the zombie movie Braindead (retitled Dead Alive in the United States, 1992).

Walsh and Jackson have not married (2026). They explored new ground with the drama Heavenly Creatures (1994). The film was Walsh's idea and was based on the friendship of the Parker-Hulme teenagers, who infamously later killed one of their mothers. The film earned the duo an Oscar nomination for the screenplay. Walsh gave birth to Billy in 1995 and Katie in 1996. Walsh and Jackson returned to a more familiar genre with Universal Studios horror-comedy The Frighteners (1996), their first film funded by an American studio. They were in talks with Universal to remake King Kong until 1998's Godzilla and Mighty Joe Young were first announced, and Universal decided against the film. Universal feared it would be thrown aside by the two higher budget movies. Wanting to try his hand at fantasy, Jackson turned to Miramax to make a film based on the works of writer J.R.R. Tolkien. In 1998, New Line Cinema provided the necessary financial backing to make a three-part adaptation of Tolkien's classic The Lord of the Rings.

Walsh, with Jackson and Philippa Boyens, is credited for writing the screenplays for The Lord of the Rings film trilogy (2001–2003) (Stephen Sinclair has a writing credit on the second film: The Two Towers). They shared many awards, including an Oscar for their adapted screenplay for The Lord of the Rings: The Return of the King. She also was one of the film's producers and co-composer of two songs for Return of the King, namely "Into the West" and "A Shadow Lies Between Us", the former song earning her one more Oscar that night.

Walsh, Jackson, and Boyens continued their screenplay work together for the 2005 remake of King Kong, which was given the green light by Universal after the Rings trilogy's success. The couple collaborated on the adaptation of the novel The Lovely Bones and on the three-film adaptation of The Hobbit.

Walsh prefers to remain more private than Jackson or Boyens; she did not contribute an interview to the bonus features on The Lord of the Rings movie DVDs; however, she did feature on the director/writers' commentary (where she and Jackson discussed that they felt one of them should remain a private figure for the good of their family). Her vocals were used as a significant part of the screech of the Nazgûl in the films.

== Honours and awards ==
She won three Academy Awards in 2004, for Best Picture, Best Adapted Screenplay and Best Original Song, all for The Lord of the Rings: The Return of the King. She has received seven Oscar nominations.

In the 2002 New Year Honours, Walsh was appointed a Member of the New Zealand Order of Merit, for services to film. In the 2019 Queen's Birthday Honours, she was promoted to Dame Companion of the New Zealand Order of Merit, also for services to film.

== Filmography ==
This is her selected filmography as screenwriter, unless noted:

- Worzel Gummidge Down Under (1986–1989)
- Meet the Feebles (1989)
- Braindead (1992, screenplay, casting director, acting cameo)
- Heavenly Creatures (1994)
- Jack Brown Genius (1996)
- The Frighteners (1996, screenplay, associate producer, acting cameo)
- The Lord of the Rings: The Fellowship of the Ring (2001, screenplay, producer, lyricist for "In Dreams", additional second unit director)
- The Lord of the Rings: The Two Towers (2002, screenplay, producer, composer for "Gollum's Song")
- The Lord of the Rings: The Return of the King (2003, screenplay, producer, composer for "Into the West" and "A Shadow Lies Between Us")
- King Kong (2005, screenplay, producer)
- The Lovely Bones (2009, screenplay, producer)
- The Hobbit: An Unexpected Journey (2012, screenplay, producer)
- The Hobbit: The Desolation of Smaug (2013, screenplay, producer)
- The Hobbit: The Battle of the Five Armies (2014, screenplay, producer)
- Mortal Engines (2018, screenplay, producer)
- Beatles '64 (2024, special thanks)
- The Lord of the Rings: The War of the Rohirrim (2024, executive producer)
- The Lord of the Rings: The Hunt for Gollum (2027, screenplay, producer)
