= Production of The Lord of the Rings film series =

Making of a fantasy film series

The production of The Lord of the Rings film series posed enormous challenges, both logistical and creative. Under Peter Jackson's direction, these obstacles were overcome between 1997 and 2004. Many attempts to produce J. R. R. Tolkien's fantasy novel The Lord of the Rings had failed; the few that had reached the screen were animations. Since the publication of the source novels in the mid-1950s, many filmmakers and producers had considered a film but then set the project aside. The series as filmed by Jackson consists of three epic fantasy adventure films. They were produced by New Line Cinema, assisted by WingNut Films. The theatre versions appeared between 2001 and 2003, and the extended edition for home video in 2004. Development began in August 1997. The films were shot simultaneously. Their production was undertaken entirely in Jackson's native New Zealand. It spanned the 14-month period from October 1999 until December 2000, with pick-up shots filmed over a further 24 months, from 2001 to 2003.

Storyboarding began in 1997; the Tolkien illustrators Alan Lee and John Howe worked as conceptual artists throughout the project, Lee mainly on architecture, Howe on characters such as Gandalf and the Balrog. Extensive sets were built, including the village of Hobbiton. Weta Workshop created armour, weapons, prosthetics, monsters and other creatures, and miniatures. Some of the miniatures, such as of the city of Minas Tirith, were very large and extremely detailed, becoming known as "bigatures". The work was driven by Jackson's desire for realism, to give the effect of history rather than fantasy. Animals were studied to make the creatures biologically believable; weapons and armour were based on appropriate medieval or classical era peoples. Some 48,000 pieces of armour, 10,000 arrows, 500 bows, 10,000 Orc heads, 1,800 pairs of Hobbit feet serving as shoes, and 19,000 costumes were created for the filming.

The composer Howard Shore saw the set in August 2000 and watched the assembly cuts of the first two films. He created around 100 leitmotifs to represent themes (such as the Ring), cultures, and characters, a record in the history of cinema, resulting in a long, complex and Academy Award-winning film score.

Visual effects broke new ground in filmmaking, from prosthetics to almost wholly digitally-realized creatures such as Gollum. The Hobbits are represented as 3 ft 6 in (107 cm) tall, and the Dwarves as around 4 ft 6 in (137 cm) tall, requiring sets both at normal scale for Men and Elves, and at larger scale for Hobbits and Dwarves — these were able to use the same scale of sets by virtue of the casting of shorter actors for Hobbits, taller actors for Dwarves. Monsters such as trolls, the Watcher in the Water, the Balrog, and the Ents were created entirely with computer-generated imagery, requiring months of design work from sketches to maquettes and finally computer work. Many scenes were created by filming natural scenery or miniatures, and combining these images with those of actors on a green-screen studio set.

== Development ==
=== Previous adaptations ===
Tolkien's novels The Hobbit (1937) and The Lord of the Rings (1954–55), set in Middle-earth, were the subject of many early failed attempts to bring the fictional universe to life in screen. Tolkien was skeptical of the prospects of an adaptation. While animated and live-action shorts were made in 1967 and 1971, the first commercial depiction of one of his books onscreen was an animated television special of The Hobbit, produced by Rankin/Bass in 1977. The first cinematic adaptation of the fictional setting was Ralph Bakshi's animated 1978 film The Lord of the Rings.

The rights to adapt Tolkien's works passed through the hands of several studios, having been briefly leased to Rembrandt Films before being sold perpetually to United Artists (UA), who then passed them in part to Saul Zaentz (which did business as Middle-earth Enterprises). Filmmakers and producers interested in an adaptation included Walt Disney, Al Brodax, Forrest J Ackerman, Samuel Gelfman, Denis O'Dell (who contacted David Lean, Stanley Kubrick and Michelangelo Antonioni to direct), and Heinz Edelmann.

At the time that Bakshi's film was released, a teenaged Peter Jackson had not read the book, and went to see the film: "I liked the early part – it had some quaint sequences in Hobbiton, a creepy encounter with the Black Rider on the road, and a few quite good battle scenes – but then, about half way through, the storytelling became very disjointed and disorientating and I really didn't understand what was going on. However, what it did do was to make me want to read the book – if only to find out what happened!" He then read the book, thinking it would make for a great live-action film. He assumed that Disney or filmmakers like George Lucas or Steven Spielberg would eventually produce one for him to see, but realized it would have been impossible to adapt at the time. An amateur filmmaker, he soon tried making original fantasy films inspired by Jason and the Argonauts and Conan the Barbarian. He did not revisit the books until 1997, thinking that he would be out of his depth to adapt them.

=== Early development ===
In 1995, Jackson and his partner Fran Walsh were finishing The Frighteners and considered doing an original high-fantasy film to keep their special effects company in business. With the new developments in computer-generated imagery following 1993's Jurassic Park, Jackson set about planning a "Lord of the Rings-type of story" but whenever he and Walsh tried conceiving of a story, they ended with something so similar to Tolkien's books as to be considered derivative. Jackson began wondering "why nobody else seemed to be doing anything about" adapting Tolkien to live-action, and at his request, his agent Ken Kamins tracked the rights to Saul Zaentz.

Since Heavenly Creatures, Jackson was in a contract with Miramax Films. While he and his lawyer were unsure whether he was contractually obligated to bring his pitch to Miramax Films first, Jackson decided to do so out of courtesy, only to realize upon calling Harvey Weinstein that he had recently rescued Zaentz' production of The English Patient, and could therefore leverage the rights from him. Jackson realized it would take multiple films to adapt the books properly, but pitched a single trilogy: one film based on The Hobbit and, if that were to prove successful, a two-part adaptation of The Lord of the Rings, shot back-to-back and released six months apart.

Negotiations with Zaentz were elongated due to Weinstein's intention to keep Zaentz from producing the film himself, and by the fact that the distribution rights for The Hobbit were left in UA's hands. Miramax Films tried to buy the rights from the studio in vain. By April 1996, Jackson had reread The Hobbit and commissioned WETA to produce concept art, when Weinstein suggested postponing it to a potential prequel.

Weinstein's dalliance led Jackson to take up an offer from Universal Studios to film a remake of King Kong. Weinstein was furious, but Jackson still intended to make The Lord of the Rings immediately afterwards, and had the book to hand, re-reading the prologue. Indeed, he suggested that Miramax Films and Universal co-distribute both films, to which Weinstein agreed once Universal threw Shakespeare in Love into the deal, as well.

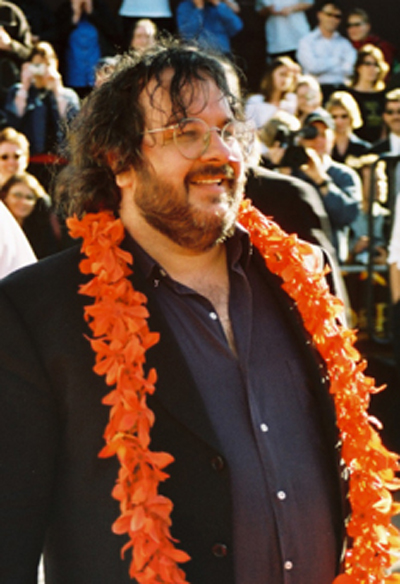
Peter Jackson in 2003, at the premiere of The Return of the King in Wellington

=== Pre-production for Miramax ===
When Universal cancelled King Kong in 1997, Jackson and Walsh immediately received support from Weinstein and began a six-week process of sorting out the rights. Jackson and Walsh asked Costa Botes to write a scene-by-scene synopsis of the book, which Jackson then rearranged as the basis for his screen treatment.

Immediately after King Kong's cancellation, Jackson clarified to Weinstein that he still intended to make two films, but concerns expressed by Miramax led him to try and write the treatment as a single film, "but by the time we had got to the end, it was clear that we were talking about two films." At the story conference at Miramax (during which the Bakshi film was screened), the Weinsteins "blanched" but accepted this. While writing the treatment, Jackson considered doing three films and "shaped our treatment into three parts" before Miramax rejected the idea.

Between the synopsis and the treatment, Jackson decided to cut Gildor, Crickhollow, the Old Forest, Tom Bombadil, the Barrow-wight, Bill Ferney, Radagast, Lothlorien and Ghan-Buri-Ghan. The final treatment divides the story into two parts: The Fellowship of the Ring (which covered the novel of that name, and The Two Towers) and The War of the Ring (which covered The Return of the King). The first opens immediately with the Battle of the Last Alliance (in what Jackson called a "James Bond" opening) and ends with Saruman's death, and Gandalf and Pippin (the latter having looked into the Palantir) going to Minas Tirith.

In this treatment, Farmer Maggot and Glorfindel are present; Gwaihir and Gandalf visit Edoras after escaping Saruman, and Eowyn and Eomer help him find Shadowfax against the wishes of a possessed Theoden. Gollum attacks Frodo when the Fellowship is still united, a struggle during which the Ring falls into the mud and is picked up by Boromir. Bilbo attends the Council of Elrond and Sam looks into Galadriel's mirror. At the end of the film, Saruman is shot by an overhead Nazgûl and, before his death, is redeemed through issuing the Palantir for Gandalf to look into. Aragorn, Legolas and Gimli are sent south to espy Sauron's forces, and Frodo and Sam are en route to the Black Gate.

The second film opens in the thick of battle, and ends with Frodo sailing to the West. It features a more pronounced romantic triangle with Arwen and Eowyn, including a scene of Aragorn and Eowyn "asleep in each other's arms"; and has Elladan, Elrohir and Erkenbrand join Aragorn on the Paths of the Dead (the latter dying in the process), which are described as though made of flesh. The Nazgul just make it into Mount Doom before they fall.

They presented this treatment to Harvey and Bob Weinstein, the latter of whom they focused on impressing with their screenwriting, as Bob had not read the book. They agreed upon two films and a total budget of $150 million across two films combined. Early discussions of casting were held, with Miramax Films wanting to "americanize" the project, and suggesting star names like Daniel Day-Lewis for Aragorn (starting "fanciful internet speculation" that Day-Lewis was allegedly approached for the part several times) and even suggested Morgan Freeman for Gandalf. Weinstein had dissuaded Jackson from considering Mira Sorvino and Ashley Judd, whom Weinstein had secretly harassed just previous to this time. Jackson compiled his own casting wishlist, which included Ian Holm for Bilbo Baggins and Cate Blanchett for Galadriel.

Meanwhile, WETA Digital developed the "MASSIVE" software and WETA Workshop began conceptual design for the films. Having used their paintings for inspiration (to the point of showing them in story conferences) Jackson suggested hiring Alan Lee and John Howe. Miramax didn't want to involve Lee, due to his association with the Tolkien Estate, but Jackson tracked the reclusive Lee through Michael Palin and convinced him and Howe to join the project. Howe, who previously mailed Lee and spoke to him on the phone once, met him on the plane. Howe brought along a collection of recreated Medieval armour for reference. A third artist, Ted Nasmith, was invited to join, but had to decline. Ralph Bakshi claimed that Jackson's company bought many of his designs.

During mid-1997, Jackson and Walsh began writing the two scripts with Stephen Sinclair. Sinclair's partner, Philippa Boyens, was a major fan of the book and joined the writing team after reading their treatment. It took 13 to 14 months to write the scripts, which were 147 and 144 pages respectively.

In this version, Farmer Maggot and Fatty Bolger appear. Gandalf is more frail and has given up pipe-smoking, and Gimli's dialogue contains several vulgarities. Sam, Merry and Pippin are all caught eavesdropping behind the door and forced to go along with Frodo. The Nazgul skewer Barliman Butterbur and Wargs attack the Hobbits near Weathertop. Gandalf's account of his time at Orthanc was pulled out of flashback and Lothlórien was cut, with Galadriel doing what she does in the story at Rivendell. Denethor attends the Council of Elrond with his son. The Watcher in the Water, absent from the treatment, is reinstated. Arwen now rescues Frodo instead of Glorfindel, and later joins the battle of Helm's Deep, where a Nazgul sweeps in, only for its fell beast slain by Gimli. Indeed, Theoden's palace is placed in Helm's Deep itself. While on the Seat of Seeing, Frodo sees the Nazgul, having killed Saruman, attack Gandalf. He puts on the Ring to draw him away and is attacked by a fell-beast, which Sam lassos to the structure. The Nazgul attacks Sam before Frodo kills it.

The second script included a sex scene between Aragorn and Arwen in the Glittering Pools, interrupted by Legolas and Gimli's sight-seeing the caves. Arwen later fends off a Nazgul that menaces Pippin and joins the Rohirrim. The writers considered having Arwen absorb Éowyn's role entirely by having her kill the Witch-king, with the resulting wound becoming the source of her illness. Faramir finds Frodo after Denethor sends him to do so, having learned the secret of the quest from Pippin. Imrahil and Forlong appear in the script, and Aragorn fights Sauron in front of the Black Gates.

Writing the scripts, Jackson and Miramax Films drew a 110-day schedule for production, beginning in April 1999, with the two films being scheduled for release in December 2000 and May 2001. In so doing, they were able to budget the films better, with Miramax Films becoming increasingly worried and asking for cost-cutting rewrites such as killing one of the four Hobbits, and sent producers to oversee the work done in New Zealand. Eventually, Marty Katz arrived to New Zealand. Spending four months there, he told Miramax Films that the films were more likely to cost $150 million; which was beyond Miramax Films' abilities.

Being a Disney-owned company at the time, Miramax Films went to chairman Joe Roth, who went to CEO Michael Eisner with a request to aid Miramax Films on budgeting the production. Eisner had recently demanded cost-cutting measures, and declined. Walsh said this was due to lack of faith in the property and concern over Jackson's proclivity to make violent films, although Eisner later claimed that he only refused because Harvey Weinstein refused to let him review the project or meet Jackson. Instead, Miramax looked for other studios like DreamWorks and Lucasfilm Ltd. to join, but were again unsuccessful, and instead consider merging the two films into one.

Bob Weinstein commissioned Jack Lechner to sketch a one-film version of the story. Lechner saw the story as too "dense" and that any two-film version would have left audiences unfulfilled since the story was only "half-told". He thought Frodo was a weak character. On 17 June 1998, he sent a memo in which he suggested cutting Bree and the Battle of Helm's Deep, "losing or using" Saruman, merging Rohan and Gondor, and making Éowyn Boromir's sister, shortening Rivendell and Moria (losing the Balrog and the fight in Balin's Tomb in the process) as well as having Ents prevent the Uruk-hai from kidnapping Merry and Pippin.

Jackson agreed that "As an exercise in reducing The Lord of the Rings to one film, it demonstrated a lot of common sense", but was upset by the idea of "cutting out half the good stuff." In the following meeting, he tried to convince Harvey Weinstein to make the first film on-budget and then make the second film, and later suggested making a one-film version under the provision that it would be four hours long. Weinstein refused, insisting on telling the whole story in a two-hour film. Jackson balked, and Miramax declared that any script or work completed by Weta Workshop was theirs, and that they would commission Hossein Amini to rewrite the script with Walsh. In fact, they had already sent the two-film script to Amini who "loved it". When Jackson and Walsh refused to co-operate, Weinstein said he had John Madden ready to direct it. In a later phone-call to Jackson's agent, Weinstein instead mentioned Quentin Tarantino. Jackson and Amini both believe this was a bluff to get Jackson to agree to make one film.

Jackson's agent later clarified to Weinstein that, should he hire other filmmakers, he could not use Jackson's scripts or designs as a basis (which would compound the cost), and that he would be better off putting the project on a turnaround, which Miramax only begrudgingly agreed to. Hoping that Jackson could be forced to make the one-film version, Miramax dictated draconian conditions for the turnaround, limiting it to just four weeks. They further demanded that the other studio repay their investment and give them 5% of the revenue of the films: half for themselves, and half for Disney.

Jackson made a 35-minute "making of" video to sell the project, and had the scripts sent out to various studios. Jackson wanted to go to New Line Cinema, where his friend Mark Ordesky was an executive. Knowing Ordesky was a fan of the books, Jackson called him with the proposition. Meanwhile, all the other studios passed. Centropolis and Sony disliked the script; 20th Century Fox was interested but declined due to Zaentz's involvement. PolyGram were also interested but were in the process of being sold to Universal. The other studios did not review the scripts.

=== Move to New Line ===
A fan of the books, New Line Cinema CEO Robert Shaye was enthusiastic about the concept ever since he heard Miramax landed it, but initially refused Mark's inquiry on account of the percentage that the Weinsteins demanded. Eventually, however, due to New Line Cinema's need for lucrative franchises, he was convinced to meet Jackson. He was still unsure, however, but Jackson feigned being busy talking to other studios to give Shaye the impression that he was "in a more competitive situation than he truly was."

Shaye had run the prospect by his head of international distribution, who said he could shore-up most of the investment from foreign distributors. He was still unsure about Jackson himself, and talked to him before the meeting, telling him that he did not like The Frighteners and that The Lord of the Rings is "probably something that we're not going to want to do." However, after viewing the video, he asked "Why would anyone want movie-goers to pay $18 when they might pay $27?". Eventually Jackson caught along that Shaye wanted to make three films, to which he responded enthusiastically. Shaye later explained he had already discussed making three films – should he decide to take the project – with his partner Michael Lynn, and went on to comment that he "would have made five if there were five books." He talked about whether they should be released within a month, two years or three.

Now Jackson, Walsh and Boyens had to write three new scripts. The expansion to three films allowed much more creative freedom, although Jackson, Walsh and Boyens had to restructure their script accordingly. The three films do not correspond exactly to the trilogy's three volumes, but rather represent a three-part adaptation. Jackson takes a more chronological approach to the story than did Tolkien. Frodo's quest is the main focus, and Aragorn is the main sub-plot. The filmmakers consulted Tolkien's biography, letters and scholarly books written on his works. They spoke with Tolkien's Estate, who decided to distance themselves from the films.

In one iteration, the film was to open in medias res with Frodo and Sam near the borders of the Shire. Farmer Maggot had a bigger role than in the finished film, and Merry and Pippin only join the quest later. Arwen follows the Fellowship to Lorien, and later rejoins them in Rohan after she rescues two refugee children from the Orcs, delivering them to Helm's Deep where a love triangle develops with Eowyn, who delivers a child while fending off Orcs in the Glittering Caves. This culminates in her riding to war with Eowyn, who saves her from the Witch-King.

Much effort was put into creating satisfactory conclusions and making sure exposition did not bog down the pacing. Along with new sequences, elements that Tolkien kept ambiguous, such as the battles and the creatures, were defined in detail. During shooting, the screenplays continued to evolve, in part as cast members explored their characters.

== Production design ==
The Lord of the Rings film series began production design in August 1997. Desiring complete realism and plausibility in his vision of Middle-earth, Jackson hired Wētā Workshop to create the armour, weapons, prosthetics and monsters seen in the trilogy.

=== Pre-visualization ===
Jackson began storyboarding the trilogy with Christian Rivers in August 1997, effectively creating a rough black and white 2-D version of the film. Jackson showed excerpts of the "animated" storyboards (filmed images with voices and a temporary soundtrack) to allow potential cast a view of the film's style.

To plan his visual effects sequences, Jackson used a lipstick camera for the models of sets and computer animatics (learned from Industrial Light & Magic), planning the battle sequences like a real general and giving a sense of direction. This often allowed room for him to improvise action sequences, such as the Moria staircase collapse (which was never in any script draft). And he bought 40,000 toy soldiers to help him visualize battle scenes. Pre-visualization continued throughout production, such as the late addition of the Ents attacking Isengard, and the siege of Minas Tirith in February 2003.

=== Art design ===
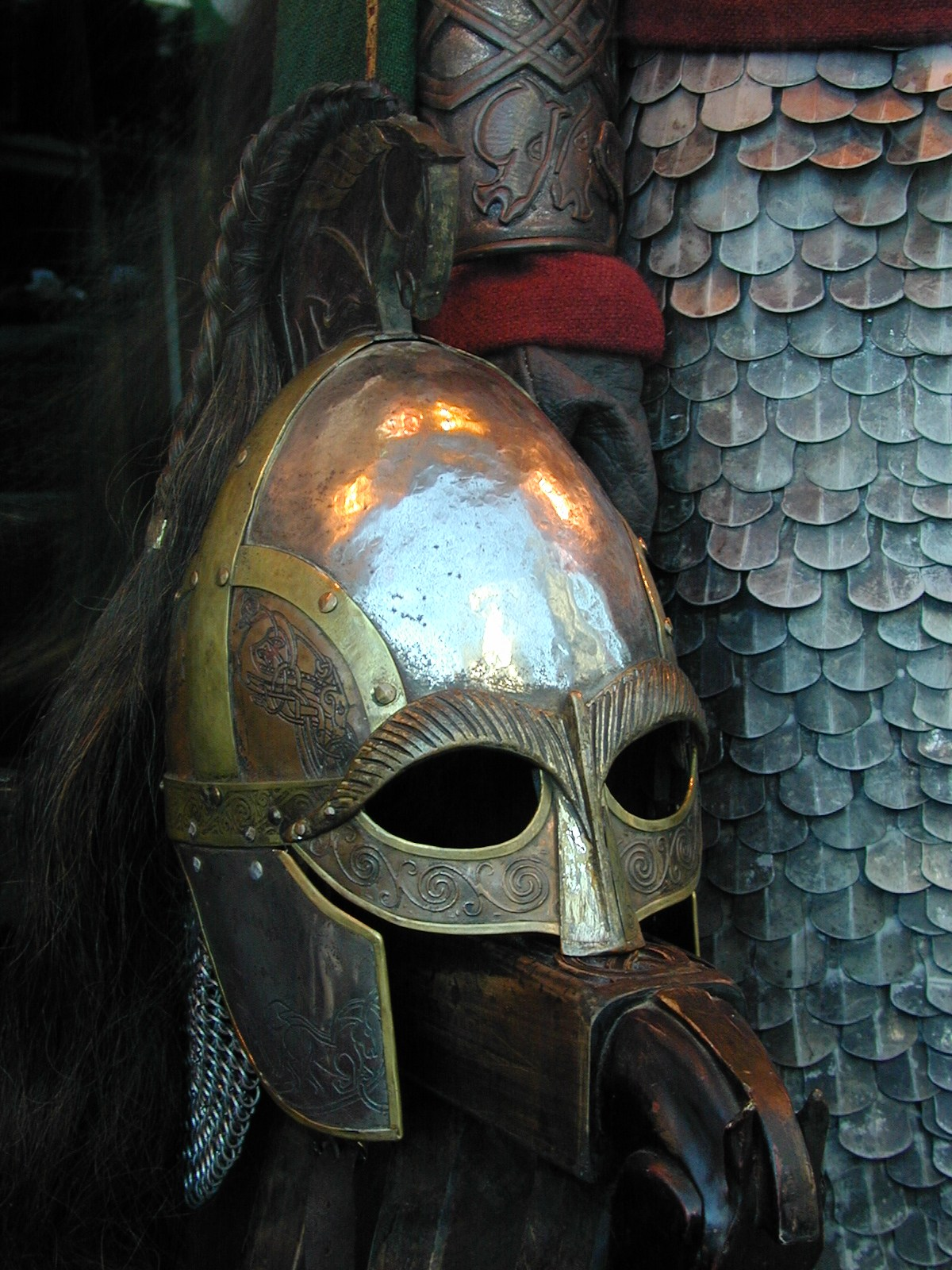
Helmet and vambrace of Rohan with interlace, spiral, and horse-motif decoration, Lord of the Rings costume and props exhibit, 2003

The design of the trilogy began in August 1997 during storyboarding. Jackson himself wanted a gritty realism and historical regard for the fantasy, repeatedly citing the 1995 historical epic Braveheart as a good example:

It might be clearer if I described it as an historical film. Something very different to Dark Crystal or Labyrinth. Imagine something like Braveheart, but with a little of the visual magic of Legend. ... It should have the historical authority of Braveheart, rather than the meaningless fantasy mumbo-jumbo of Willow.

In November 1997, the Tolkien illustrators Alan Lee and John Howe joined the project. Up until then, concept artists had primarily been influenced by Dungeons & Dragons in their designs. Some of their famous images of Bag End, Orthanc, Helm's Deep, the Black Gate, and Howe's Gandalf and the Balrog made it into the film. The last one inspired the opening sequence of The Two Towers. Jackson sometimes replicated shots from famous Tolkien illustrations as a nod to fans.

Lee worked on designs for architecture, the first being Helm's Deep, as well as the Elven realms, Moria, Edoras, and Minas Tirith, and although Howe primarily designed armour and the forces of evil, he contributed to the design of Bag End, Minas Morgul, Cirith Ungol and Barad-dûr. Lee applied a personal touch by painted imagery in Rivendell, such as of Isildur removing the One Ring from Sauron, as well as tapestries in Edoras. There are many real-life influences on the Middle-earth of the films: Rivendell is "a cross between a Japanese Temple and Frank Lloyd Wright", and Minas Tirith takes influence from Mont Saint-Michel and the Palatine Chapel in Aachen. The City of the Dead takes stylistic inspiration from Petra, Jordan, and the Grey Havens were inspired by the paintings of J. M. W. Turner.

Grant Major was charged with the task of converting Lee and Howe's designs into architecture, creating models of the sets, whilst Dan Hennah worked as art director, scouting locations and organizing the building of sets. The army often helped out, too, building Hobbiton almost a year before filming to give the impression of real growth and age, moving 5,000 cubic metres (180,000 cu ft) of earth, and creating roads to the Edoras location during six months of building. Some sets were reshaped: the caverns of Isengard became Shelob's Lair, and Helm's Deep became a Minas Tirith backlot.

The Art Department was careful to respect nature, considering its importance to Tolkien, such as taking plants from the Edoras location into a nursery. They sometimes moulded shapes from real rocks and bark, and fixed branches into a steel structure with polystyrene for more convincing prop trees. Brian Massey led the Greens Department, and even wrote a booklet on tree growth when he complained of the props "being too coney" for Lothlórien when the time came to film Fangorn Forest. The numerous props within the trilogy were all originally designed at different scales, and many craftsmen were hired, including Jens Hansen Gold & Silversmith to create 15 replicas of The One Ring.

The contemporary jeweller Jasmine Watson created pieces including the Evenstar jewel worn by Arwen, and Nenya, the ring worn by Galadriel. Statues were sculpted out of polystyrene, although some thrones seen in the trilogy were crafted from marble, stone and wood. A former bank worker, Daniel Reeve, was hired to write the numerous books, spines, documents, maps, diagrams and even Orc graffiti that appear in the trilogy.

=== Wētā Workshop ===
Elijah Wood as Frodo Baggins, holding his leaf-shaped sword Sting

Jackson hired longtime collaborator Richard Taylor to lead Wētā Workshop on five major design elements: armour, weapons, prosthetics/makeup, creatures and miniatures. John Howe was the supervisor on armour, having studied and worn it. Stu Johnson and Warren Green made 48,000 pieces of armour from the numerous moulds of plate steel. A small group of crew members spent three years linking plastic chain mail, eventually wearing their thumbprints away. Peter Lyon forged swords, each taking from three to six days, with spring steel "hero" swords for close-ups, aluminum fight swords and rubber versions. Wētā created 10,000 real arrows and 500 bows.

Wētā created numerous prosthetics and continually monitored them on set. They created 1,800 Orc body suits to go with 10,000 Orc heads, taking six days and one day respectively. Elijah Wood, who portrayed Frodo, revealed in 2021 that one of the Orcs was designed to resemble Harvey Weinstein.

Wētā spent a year creating hobbit feet to look like large, furry feet, yet act as shoes for the actors. In total, 1,800 pairs were worn by the four lead hobbit actors during production. Actors went in for face casts to create pointed ears and false noses. Most extensive was John Rhys-Davies as Gimli, whose Dwarven prosthetics required four-and-a-half hours to apply each morning.

Wētā's first completed creature was the cave troll. Production designers wanted to make the Orcs totally animalistic before the switch to prosthetics. They gave specific designs to the Moria Orcs, Uruk-hai, and Mordor Orcs, so as to make these characters visually distinct. They sought to make their creatures biologically believable: Shelob's body is based on an Australasian funnel-web spider, while the Wargs are a bear/hyena/wolf hybrid. Howe lent himself for Beswarick to study when shaping Gollum; Beswarick took inspiration from Iggy Pop due to his skin-muscle ratio.

The backstories of the cultures depicted in the films had to be shown through subliminal glimpses on screen, while for the Elves and Gondorians, fictional histories were presented by changing styles of armour. The Elves have an Art Nouveau influence that involves leaves and flowers, while the Dwarves have a preoccupation with geometry intended to remind the audience of their digging nature. The Hobbits hark back to 18th-century England, the Rohirrim feature horse and sun motifs with visual inspiration from Beowulf and the Anglo-Saxon artifacts found in the Sutton Hoo burial ship, and the Gondorians reflect 16th-century German and Italian armour and the motif of the White Tree. The evil Haradrim Men take influence from Aztecs and Kiribati after bad feedback from Phillipa Boyens over looking African. Most of the Orc armour is sharp, reflecting secateurs, and is written with runes to reflect worship of Sauron.

Several liberties were taken in adapting Tolkien's weaponry and armour to the screen. While plate armour is used in the films, it is unmentioned in the author's writings (except for vambraces), where scale and especially mail predominate. Some swords, like the broken royal sword Narsil, are interpreted as two-handed longswords. These design choices help evoke the Late Medieval and Renaissance periods, whereas Tolkien's original atmosphere is generally more akin to the Early Medieval period. In a private letter, Tolkien compared Middle-earth clothing and war gear to that of early medieval Europe and the Bayeux Tapestry. Weta invented Elvish inscriptions for weapons like the spear Aeglos and the swords Sting and Narsil. In some cases, Tolkien writes about runes on sword blades but does not give them in detail. The Elves in the film series use curved swords, whereas the author mostly assigns such swords to Orcs and enemy Men (he mentions one Elf with a curved sword in very early writings). The designers went so far as to invent new weapons, such as Arwen's Elvish sword Hadhafang; while the design is original, the name is derived from Tolkien's "Etymologies" in The Lost Road.

To develop fight and sword choreography for the series, the filmmakers employed the Hollywood sword-master Bob Anderson.

=== Costumes ===
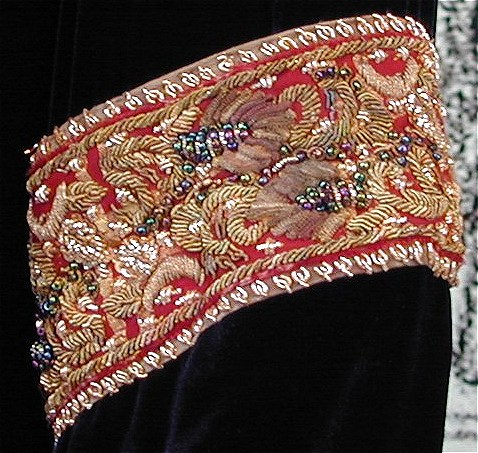
Detail of embroidery on the sleeve of Arwen's "mourning dress", 2003 costume and props exhibit

Ngila Dickson was hired to handle the numerous costumes. She and 40 seamstresses worked on over 19,000 costumes for the film series. Due to the large shooting schedule, 10 versions of each costume were made, with 30 more for stunt, scale and other doubles, all in all meaning each design had 40 versions. Due to Jackson's requirement of realism, the costumers took great pains to make costumes look "lived in", wearing away colour, stuffing pockets and dirtying costumes for the likes of Gandalf and Aragorn due to their terrain-crossing nature. As with armour, acid etching and overdyeing of colours were applied. Dickson decided to give the Hobbits shorts because of their bare feet, and worked on long sleeves for the Elves for a gliding impression. Dickson took great pains to distinguish the colours worn by the Gondorians (silver and black) and the Rohirrim (brown and green).

== Filming ==
Principal photography for The Lord of the Rings film trilogy was conducted concurrently in New Zealand for 438 days from 11 October 1999 through 22 December 2000. Pick-up shoots were conducted annually from 2001 to 2003. The trilogy was shot at many different locations, with seven different units shooting, as well as at soundstages around Wellington and Queenstown. Jackson directed the whole production, while unit directors included Alun Bollinger, John Mahaffie, Geoff Murphy, Fran Walsh, Barrie Osborne and Rick Porras. Jackson monitored these units with live satellite feeds, and with the added pressure of constant script re-writes and the multiple units handling his vision, he only got around four hours of sleep a night.

Jackson described the production as the world's largest home movie, due to the independence and sense of family. Producer Barrie Osborne saw it as a travelling circus. Fran Walsh described writing the script for the production as laying the track down in front of a moving train. Jackson described shooting as like organizing an army, with 2,400 people involved at the height of production. Due to the remoteness of some of New Zealand's untamed landscapes, the crew carried survival kits in case helicopters could not reach the locations to bring them home in time.

=== Late 1999 ===
October 11, 1999 – the first scene filmed for the trilogy was the scene in which the Hobbits hide from a Ringwraith

The first scene filmed was the "Wooded Road" sequence in The Fellowship of the Ring, where the Hobbits hide beneath a tree from a mounted Ringwraith. The focus was generally on The Fellowship of the Ring when the Hobbits try to reach Rivendell, such as a single night in Bree exteriors, to encourage the four actors playing the hobbits to bond. Second units shot the Ford of Bruinen chase and the deforestation of Isengard. Liv Tyler generally came to New Zealand for stunts, and spent five days on a barrel for Bruinen while her riding double Jane Abbott did the horseback scenes.

During the first month of filming, Stuart Townsend was deemed too young to play Aragorn; he was replaced within three days by Viggo Mortensen, just in time to film the Weathertop sequence. Mortensen, who took the role in part because his own son was a fan of the series, became a hit on set, going fishing, always taking his "hero" sword around and applying dirt to his costume to improve costume designer Ngila Dickson's makeshift look. He headbutted the stunt team as a sign of friendship, and bought himself his horse, Uraeus, as well as another horse for Abbott.

"What is amazing when you look at the finished scene in Return of the King, is to think that every time we cut to and from between Frodo and Sam we are actually jumping back and forth across a year-long gap." – Peter Jackson

The Cirith Ungol stair ledge was built as a wet weather set on a squash court in a hotel in Queenstown. On 24 November 1999, Sean Astin's close-ups on the Cirith Ungol set were shot in what became the first shots to be filmed for The Return of the King. Andy Serkis (Gollum) had not yet been cast. The set remained standing on the squash court and it was not until a year later, on 30 November 2000, that Elijah Wood's first close-ups were shot on the same ledge. This became a general failsafe measure when the weather disrupted the shooting schedule. Shooting then focused on the battle of Amon Hen. Sean Bean began filming in November.

=== 2000 ===
A Christmas break and millennium celebrations followed; filming resumed on 17 January. Ian McKellen, fresh from filming X-Men, arrived to film scenes in Hobbiton and the Grey Havens. McKellen worked mainly with the hobbits' scale doubles rather than the actual hobbit actors, but when Christopher Lee arrived in February, they became very friendly. The Grey Havens sequence at the end of The Return of the King was shot three times.

While the Hobbit leads had scenes in Hobbiton interiors and Rivendell exteriors in Kaitoke Park with new arrival Ian Holm, Mortensen, Orlando Bloom and John Rhys-Davies filmed scenes involving the Rohirrim countryside. Mortensen broke his toe kicking an Orc helmet on camera, Bloom fell off his horse and broke a rib, and Rhys-Davies' scale and stunt double Brett Beattie dislocated his knee. They spent two days injured during the "orc hunting" sequence seen in the second film. Soon after, they spent a month of day shoots at Helm's Deep and another three months of night shoots handled by Mahaffie, in Dry Creek Quarry outside Wellington, during which one of Mortensen's teeth was knocked out and Bernard Hill was hit on the ear with the flat of a sword. The extras insulted each other in Māori and improvised stunts, partially because those dressed in Uruk-hai prosthetics got extremely cold.

The production then got larger, with Wood and Astin shooting scenes in Mount Ruapehu for Emyn Muil and Mount Doom. On 13 April 2000, Andy Serkis joined the cast. In the meantime, the Battle of the Black Gate was shot, during which Sala Baker wore the Sauron armour. The Black Gate scene was filmed at a former minefield in the Rangipo Desert, and soldiers served as extras. With the return of Sean Bean, the Fellowship reunited and proceeded to shoot the Moria sequence.

In June they began shooting scenes on soundstages with Cate Blanchett for Lothlórien, as well as a week of exterior shooting for the Lothlórien farewell sequence. Other scenes shot in June were the Paths of the Dead across various locations, including Pinnacles. In July the crew shot some Shelob scenes, while another unit shot in July to August, and during September the scenes in Fangorn Forest and Isengard were developed. Dominic Monaghan and Billy Boyd tried numerous takes of their entrance, stressing the word "weed" as they smoked pipe-weed. Christopher Lee spent his part of his scene mostly alone, though McKellen and Hill arrived on the first day for a few lines to help.

Detailed online diaries kept by McKellen during the filming of the series beginning in January 2000 titled the Gray Book and the White Book, mirroring his character's transformation, became known as an early source of information of how the concept of the prologue, the opening and the shape of the movie were in flux during production, and have been described as an early embrace of the online blogging concept.

=== 2001–2004: Pick-ups ===
Pick-up shoots were conducted from 2001 to 2003 for six weeks every year, with a Paths of the Dead scene in 2004.

=== Environmental impact ===
The filming aroused concern over the environmental impact on the many film locations within New Zealand's national parks and conservation areas. Wingnut Films were granted a concession to film within these areas. The Royal Forest and Bird Protection Society of New Zealand and the Tongariro/Taupo Conservation Board questioned the concession, as it incorrectly allowed activities, such as fantasy filming and vehicles off-roads at Tongariro National Park, inconsistent with park management plans. The ecological significance of an internationally important wetland was missed. The process was rushed through without public involvement. Considerations of visual effects and their mitigation were not rigorous. Access was granted for a large-scale operation that had nothing to do with the parks' conservation purposes. The filming in Tongariro National Park caused enough disturbance to areas including "Orc Road", that contractors had to be hired to restore the areas later.

== Post-production ==
Each film had the benefit of a full year of post-production time before its respective December release, often finishing in October or November, with the crew immediately going to work on the next film. In this period's later part, Jackson moved to London to supervise the scoring and to continue editing, while having a computer feed for discussions to The Dorchester Hotel, and a "fat pipe" of Internet connections from Pinewood Studios to look at the visual effects. He had a video link and 5.1 surround sound to organize meetings and listen to new music and sound effects generally wherever he was. The extended editions had a tight schedule at the start of each year to complete special effects and music.

=== Editing ===
Jackson initially intended to edit all three films himself at once, assisted by Jamie Selkirk. This soon proved too ambitious, and Selkirk (who continued to act as the supervising editor) hired a different editor for the first two films: John Gilbert, who worked some reels to be shown to distributors during the shoot and edited the first film, while Michael J. Horton and Jabez Olssen worked on the second. Selkirk and Annie Collins edited the third. Initially, they were all intended to cut them simultaneously, but after a month, overseeing three edits became too much for Jackson, and he focused on editing the first film, while the other editors created assemblies of the other films. Daily rushes often lasted for as much as four hours, with scenes created throughout 1999 to 2002 for the rough (4½-hour) assemblies of the films. In total, 1,828 kilometres (5,997,000 ft) of film, representing 1110 hours, was edited down to the 11 hours and 26 minutes of the extended edition's running time.

The first film's editing was relatively easygoing, although after a screening to New Line they had to re-edit the beginning for a prologue. The Two Towers was always acknowledged by the crew as the most difficult film to make, as "it had no beginning or end", with the additional problem of inter-cutting storylines appropriately. Jackson continued editing when that part of the schedule officially ended, resulting in some scenes, including the reforging of Andúril, Gollum's backstory, and Saruman's demise, being moved to The Return of the King. Later, Saruman's demise was cut from the theatrical edition (but included in the extended edition) when Jackson felt it was not starting the third film effectively enough. As with all parts of the third film's post-production, editing was chaotic. The first time Jackson actually saw the completed film was the day before the Wellington premiere.

Many filmed scenes remained unused, even in the extended editions. Promotional material for The Fellowship of the Ring contained an attack by Orcs from Moria on Lothlórien after the Fellowship leaves Moria, replaced with a more suspenseful entrance for the Fellowship. Also cut were scenes from the book, including Frodo seeing more of Middle-earth at Parth Galen, an extended Council of Elrond and new scenes with an attack upon Frodo and Sam at the river Anduin by an Uruk-hai.

A major cut from The Two Towers featured Arwen and Elrond visiting Galadriel at Lothlórien, with Arwen then leading the Elven reinforcements to Helm's Deep. This scene, and a flashback to Arwen and Aragorn's first meeting, was cut during a revision of the film's plot; the Elves' appearance was explained with a telepathic communication between Elrond and Galadriel. Éowyn was to have a greater role in defending the refugees in the Glittering Caves from Uruk-hai intruders, while in Osgiliath, Faramir was to have a vision of Frodo becoming like Gollum, with Frodo and Sam having an extended fight sequence.

Filmed for The Return of the King were two scenes present in the book: Sam using the Phial of Galadriel to pass the Watchers at Cirith Ungol, and further epilogue footage, with endings for Legolas and Gimli, Éowyn and Faramir's wedding and Aragorn's death and funeral. Sauron was to fight Aragorn at the Black Gate, but with Jackson deciding the scene was inappropriate, a computer-generated troll was used instead. To give context for Wormtongue killing Saruman, and Legolas in turn killing Wormtongue, it was to be revealed that Wormtongue poisoned Théodred. The final scene cut was Aragorn having his armour fitted for the Battle of the Black Gate by the trilogy's armourers, which was the final scene filmed during principal photography.

=== Music ===
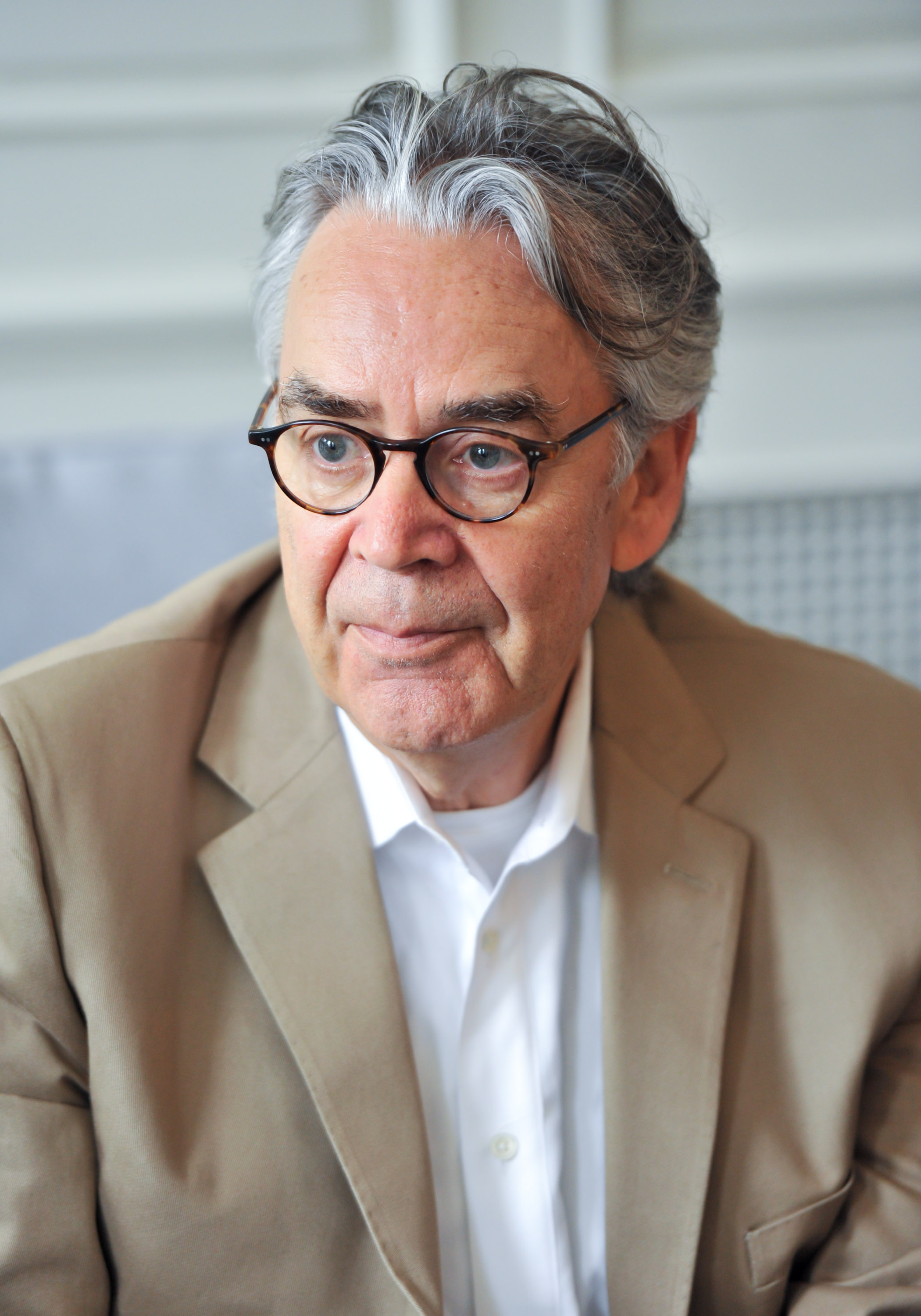
Howard Shore composed, orchestrated, conducted and produced the trilogy's music

Canadian composer Howard Shore composed, orchestrated, conducted and arranged the trilogy's music. He was hired in August 2000 and visited the set, and then watched the assembly cuts of The Fellowship of the Ring and The Return of the King. In the music, Shore included many (85 to 110) leitmotifs to represent various characters, cultures, and places – the largest catalogue of leitmotifs in the history of cinema, surpassing that of the entire Star Wars film series. For example, there are multiple leitmotifs just for the hobbits and the Shire. Although the first film had some of its score recorded in Wellington, virtually all of the trilogy's score was recorded in Watford Town Hall and mixed at Abbey Road Studios. Jackson planned to advise the score for six weeks each year in London, though for The Two Towers he stayed for twelve.

The three scores were primarily played by the London Philharmonic Orchestra (ranging from 93 to 120 players throughout the recording), London Voices, and London Oratory School Schola boy choir; many other artists, such as Ben Del Maestro, Enya, Renée Fleming, James Galway, Annie Lennox and Emilíana Torrini, contributed. Even the actors Billy Boyd, Viggo Mortensen, Liv Tyler, Miranda Otto (extended cuts only for the latter two) and Peter Jackson (for a single gong sound in the second film) contributed to the score. Fran Walsh and Philippa Boyens served as librettists, writing lyrics to various music and songs, which David Salo translated into Tolkien's languages. The third film's end song, "Into the West", was a tribute to a young filmmaker Jackson and Walsh befriended named Cameron Duncan, who died of cancer in 2003.

Shore composed a main theme for The Fellowship of the Ring rather than many different character themes, and its strengths and weaknesses in volume are depicted at different points in the series. On top of that, individual themes were composed to represent different cultures. Infamously, the amount of music Shore had to write every day for the third film increased dramatically to around seven minutes. The music for the series turned out to be a success and has been voted best movie soundtrack of all time for six years running, passing Schindler's List (1993), Gladiator (2000), Star Wars (1977), and Out of Africa (1985) respectively.

=== Sound ===
Sound technicians spent the early part of each year trying to find the right sounds. Fran Walsh contributed to the Nazgûl scream and David Farmer the Warg howls. Other sounds were unexpected: the fell beast's screech is taken from that of a donkey, and the mûmakil's bellow comes from the beginning and end of a lion's roar. In addition, automated dialogue replacement (ADR) was used for most of the dialogue. The technicians worked with New Zealand locals to get many of the sounds. They re-recorded sounds in abandoned tunnels for an echo-like effect in the Moria sequence. 20,000 New Zealand cricket fans provided the sound of the Uruk-hai army in The Two Towers, with Jackson acting as conductor during the innings break of a one-day international cricket match between England and New Zealand at Westpac Stadium. They spent time recording sounds in a graveyard at night, and also had construction workers drop stone blocks for the sounds of boulders firing and landing in The Return of the King. Mixing took place between August and November at "The Film Mix", before Jackson commissioned the building of a new studio in 2003. The building, however, had not yet been fully completed when they started mixing for The Return of the King.

== Visual effects ==
The film series used many practical and digital visual effects that were unheard of in the film industry. Ranging from prosthetics and props to creatures almost entirely made through computer graphics, the process of making the film series has been praised as having advanced the field of cinematic visual effects. Wētā Workshop was the major stylistic force behind the films, working on concepts, sets and digital effects years before the first scenes were even shot. The series was also briefly aided by Digital Domain in the first movie. Props, sets, prosthetics and locations were given the utmost concentration and detail to achieve a look that was as realistic as possible.

=== Scale ===
Production was complicated by the use of scale doubles (of sets) and forced perspective on a level never seen before in the film industry. In the Middle-earth storyverse, Hobbits are 3 ft 6 in (107 cm) tall, Dwarves are a foot taller at about 4 ft 6 in (137 cm), and Men and Elves are average human height, about 5 ft (150 cm) to 6 ft (180 cm). However, the films used two scale sets instead of three by casting taller than average actors to play Dwarves, then combining Dwarves and Hobbits into one size scale. Elijah Wood is 5 ft 6 in (168 cm) tall in real life and the other three Hobbit actors are roughly only an inch taller, while John Rhys-Davies, who played the Dwarf Gimli, is 6 ft 1 in (185 cm). Thus in the ending shot of the Council of Elrond scene, when all nine members of the Fellowship of the Ring are standing together, Rhys-Davies and the four Hobbit actors were filmed together first. The human-sized characters (Gandalf, Aragorn, Boromir and Legolas) were filmed in a second take, and the two shots were composited at different scales to make one image, making the initial Dwarf/Hobbit character shot seem smaller. An unintended advantage of not creating a third scale for Dwarves is that in a scene in which only Dwarves and Hobbits interact, no scale doubles are needed.

=== Miniatures ===
An early composite of the actor Ian McKellen in the miniature of Isengard for The Lord of the Rings: The Return of the King

Weta coined the term "bigature" for the 72 large miniatures produced for the film, in reference to their extreme size. Out of around six of the shooting crews, there was one specifically devoted to filming on the miniatures, working continuously for years until the end of The Return of the King. Such miniatures include the 1:4 scale for Helm's Deep, which alongside Khazad-dûm and Osgiliath, was one of the first built. Most sets were constructed to allow compositing with the models and matte paintings, and were built in sections to make them easier to travel with. Each of these "bigatures" were required to have an extreme amount of detail, as the cameras were filming within inches of the masterpieces to make the sets look as realistic as possible. Notable examples include the Argonath, Minas Tirith, the tower and caverns of Isengard, Barad-dûr, the trees of Lothlórien and Fangorn Forest and the Black Gate. Alex Funke led the motion control camera rigs, and John Baster and Mary Maclahlan led the building of the miniatures. The miniatures unit worked more than any other special effects crew, labouring for over 900 days.

=== Animation and computer graphics visual effects ===
Creatures such as trolls, the Watcher in the Water, the Balrog, the Ents, the fell beasts, the Wargs, the mûmakil and Shelob were created entirely with computer-generated imagery. Each one went through months of creation and variation as sketches before approved designs were sculpted into five-foot maquettes and scanned into a computer. Animators then rigged skeletons and muscles before animation and final detailed colouring scanned from painted maquettes. Treebeard had a digital face composited upon the original animatronic, which was scanned for the digital model of his longshots.

Along with the creatures, Weta created realistic digital doubles for many miniature longshots, as well as numerous stunts, most notably for the acrobatic Elf Legolas. These doubles were scanned from having actors perform movements in a motion-capture suit, with additional details created using ZBrush. There are even morphs between the doubles and actors at times. Horses performed with motion capture points, though horse deaths were represented using keyframe animation.

Weta began animating Gollum (also called Sméagol) in late 1998, using a generic human muscle system, to convince New Line Cinema they could achieve it. Andy Serkis played Gollum by providing his voice and movements on set, as well as performing within the motion capture suit. His scenes were filmed twice, with and without him. Originally Gollum was set to solely be a CGI character, but Jackson was so impressed by Serkis's audition tape that they used him on set as well. A team led by Randy Cook performed the animation using both motion capture data and manual recreation of Serkis's facial reference. Gollum's CGI model was redesigned using a subdivision surface model instead of the NURBS model for Fellowship (a similar rebuild was done for the digital doubles of the lead actors) to better resemble Serkis. This allowed the filmmakers to create a shot where Serkis, made-up to resemble Gollum, is believably replaced with the CGI Gollum. The original model can still be glimpsed briefly in the first film. Over Christmas 2001, the crew proceeded to reanimate all the previous shots accordingly. Another problem was that the crew realized that the cast performed better in the versions of the film when Serkis was present. In the end, the CGI Gollum was often animated on top of these scenes, and Serkis was painted out. Shots such as his crawling with more than human skill down a sheer cliff were shot with no live reference. Serkis did motion-capture for the character to drive the body of the model, whilst animators created the finger and facial movements. Gino Acevedo supervised realistic skin tones, which for the first time used a subsurface scattering shader, taking four hours per frame to render. Render time refers to the amount of time it took the computer to process the image into a usable format; it does not include the amount of time it took the texture artists to "draw" the frame. The hair dynamics of CGI Gollum in The Two Towers were generated using Maya Cloth. Because of its technical limitations, Weta subsequently moved to the Syflex system for The Return of the King.

Because the Nazgûl or Ringwraiths were turned to wraith-like versions of their former terrible selves, they were portrayed by tall, slim actors wearing prosthetics and costumes. Filmed on a studio set, the settings and appearances of the Ringwraiths were later edited to look chaotic and terrible. Besides Weathertop, many scenes in The Lord of the Rings trilogy were shot in this way, first by filming the scenery or set miniatures, then the actors on a green-screen studio set, and merging the two. In the Mines of Moria, Gandalf has a scene combined with computer graphics as he grapples with the Balrog as they fall to their deaths.

Christoper Hery (ILM), Ken McGaugh and Joe Letteri (both Wētā and formerly ILM) received a 2003 Academy Award, Scientific or Technical for implementing the BSSRDF technique used for Gollum's skin in a production environment. Henrik Wann Jensen (Stanford University), Stephen Robert Marschner (Cornell University and previously Stanford University), and Pat Hanrahan (Stanford University) (but not the fourth coauthor Marc Levoy), who developed BSSRDF, won another the same year.

=== Software ===
Weta developed a variety of software approaches, including the MASSIVE crowd simulation for battle sequences, to create the many special effects used in the films. Stephen Regelous developed MASSIVE in 1996. It offers a large number of choices for each software agent to pick when inside a digital arena. Catherine Thiel provided the movements of each type of soldier, like the unique fighting styles (designed by Tony Wolf) or fleeing.

While Jackson insisted on using miniatures where possible, sometimes shots became too difficult for that, primarily with the digital characters. Sometimes natural elements like cloud, dust and fire (which was used as the electronic data for the Wraithworld scenes and the Balrog) were composited, as were natural environments for the Pelennor Fields. To give a "painterly" look to the films, cinematographer Peter Doyle worked on every scene within the computer to strengthen colours and add extra mood and tone to the proceedings. Gold was tinted into Hobbiton, whilst cooler colours were strengthened into Lothlórien, Moria and Helm's Deep. Such a technique took 2–3 weeks to do, and allowed some freedom with the digital source for some extra editing.

The Return of the King used RealFlow software to simulate the molten lava into which Gollum sinks inside Mount Doom.

== See also ==
- Peter Jackson's interpretation of The Lord of the Rings
- The Hobbit (film series)
- The Lord of the Rings: The Rings of Power

== Notes ==
FOTR. He only worked on The Fellowship of the Ring.
TT. He only worked on The Two Towers.
ROTK. He only worked on The Return of the King.

== Sources ==
- Sibley, Brian (2002). The Making of the Movie Trilogy. HarperCollins. ISBN 978-0-618-26022-5.
