= Maxwell Render =

- Developer(s): Next Limit Technologies
- Initial release: 26 April 2006; 18 years ago
- Stable release: 5.0 / 30 October 2019; 5 years ago
- Operating system: Linux (on x86-64); Mac OS X (on IA-32 and PowerPC); Microsoft Windows (on IA-32 and x86-64)
- Available in: English
- Type: Raytracer
- License: Proprietary commercial software
- Website: www.maxwellrender.com

Maxwell Render is an unbiased 3D render engine, developed by Next Limit Technologies in Madrid, Spain. This stand-alone software is used in the film, animation, and VFX industry, as well as in architectural and product design visualization. It offers various plug-ins for 3D/CAD and post production applications.

== Overview ==
Maxwell Render was released to the public as an early alpha in December 2004 (after two years of internal development) utilizing a global illumination (GI) algorithm based on a metropolis light transport variation. Next Limit Technologies released its latest version of Maxwell Render V4.2 in February 2018.

The physically correct rendering engine was originally used as a tool for animation and visual effects. Maxwell Render's trademark Multilight feature, which permits the changing of light intensities and colors in real time, was used in the feature film The Curious Case of Benjamin Button.

== General features ==
Physically-based advantages

- Accuracy
- Advanced Ray Tracing
- Physical Sky
- Fast scene set-up
- Layer-based materials
- Multilight

Multilight™ FIRE: Fast Interactive Rendering

- Immediate feedback to make adjustments to lighting, materials and camera settings

Materials Realistic Camera Model

- Real camera parameters: f-Stop, Focal length, Shutter speed, ISO, film size, diaphragm blades

Memory Saving Instances Accurate 3D Motion Blur Hair, Grass and Fur

- Compatible with many hair systems: Maya Shave and a Haircut, Maya hair, 3ds Max hair, CINEMA hair, Ornatrix

Volumetrics Particle Rendering

- Integration with RealFlow software
- Maxwell Sea
- Maxwell Volumetric
- Maxwell Grass
- Maxwell Scatter

Industry standard support

- Alembic
- AxF
- Deep compositing
- Pixar Open SubDiv
- Python scripting
- VDB

Network Rendering Post Production

- Post production plug-ins
- Channels
- Custom Alphas

== Interaction with other software ==
Maxwell Render for SketchUp is a simplified version of Maxwell Render, fully integrated into the SketchUp software application. Users can set the camera, lighting and environment, apply SketchUp or Maxwell MXM materials, and render and save image files. It is widely used in product design, architectural and engineering visualization.

== Plug-ins ==
3D application plug-ins

- SolidWorks
- SoftImage
- MODO
- MAYA
- Houdini
- Rhinoceros
- SketchUp
- LightWave
- Graphisoft ArchiCAD
- Bonzai 3D
- REVIT
- 3DS MAX
- CINEMA 4D
- form Z

Postproduction application plug-ins

- Photoshop
- Nuke
- After effects

Third party supported plug-ins

- solidThinking
- blender

== Version history ==
2004	Maxwell Render Alpha version
2005	Maxwell Render Beta version
2006	Maxwell Render 1.0 Maxwell Render 1.1
2007	Maxwell Render 1.5 Maxwell Render 1.6 Maxwell Render 1.6.1
2008	Maxwell Render 1.7
2009	Maxwell Render 2.0
2011	Maxwell Render Suite 2.6 Maxwell for Google SketchUp
2012	Maxwell Render 2.7 Maxwell Render Learning Edition Maxwell Render 2.7.1
2013	Maxwell for SketchUp Maxwell Render 3.0
2014	Maxwell Render 3.0.1 Maxwell Render 3.0.1.1 beta
2015	Maxwell Render 3.1 Maxwell Render 3.1.0.2 Maxwell Render 3.2
2016	Maxwell Render 4.0.0.11
2017	Maxwell Render 4.0.1.1 Maxwell Render 4.1
2018	Maxwell Render 4.2.0.2 Maxwell Render 4.2.0.3
2019	Maxwell Render 5.0

== See also ==
- Ray tracing
- Kerkythea - A free unbiased renderer
- LuxRender - An open source unbiased renderer
- Octane Render - A commercial unbiased GPU-accelerated renderer
