= Next Limit Technologies =

Company in Madrid, Spain

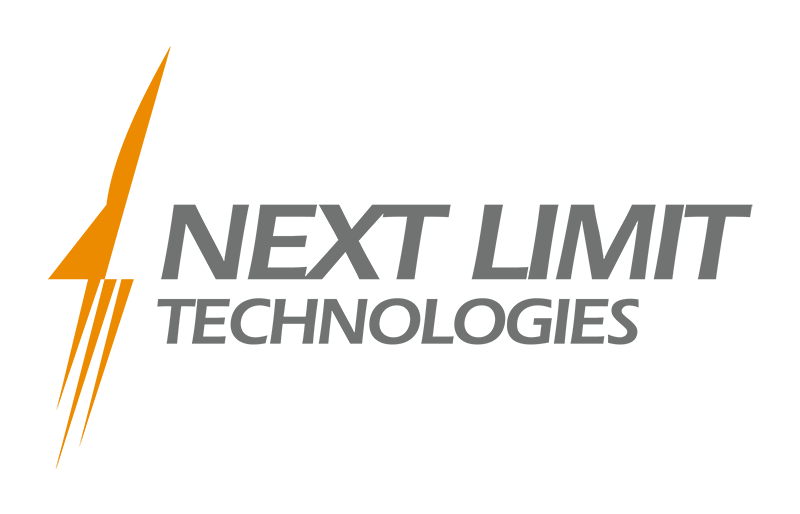
- Company type: Simulation Technologies
- Industry: Computer Software
- Founded: February 14, 1998 in Madrid, Spain
- Founders: Victor Gonzalez and Ignacio Vargas
- Headquarters: Madrid, Spain
- Products: XFlow, RealFlow, Maxwell Render, CaronteFX
- Website: http://nextlimit.com

Next Limit Technologies is a computer software company headquartered in Madrid, Spain. Founded in 1998 by engineers Victor Gonzalez and Ignacio Vargas, the firm develops various technologies in the field of digital simulation and visualization. In December 2016, the XFlow division was acquired by Dassault Systèmes.

== Products ==
- RealFlow — a dynamics and fluid simulator for film production. RealFlow has been used in the production of films such as: The Lord of the Rings: The Return of the King.
- Maxwell Render — a physically correct light simulator and render engine;
- XFlow — an engineering software for Computational fluid dynamics.
- CaronteFX — an integrated physically-based animation editor extension tool for the Unity game engine.

== Research and development ==
Next Limit has actively participated in various research projects throughout Europe as well as Spain. It is currently the leader of the European project, SAFECITI (Safe Citizen), which aims to create a simulation system for analysts that would predict the behavior of large crowds in urban environments in moments of panic, violence, or catastrophes. The system is based on serious game technology and is designed as a training platform. Other European projects that Next Limit has actively participated in are: PRISM, Skycoat and COELUX. COELUX is responsible for the production of a window with an optics system based on nanotechnology that can reproduce natural light and the appearance of solar and sky light. This technology is implemented in closed spaces that lack an exterior facing window.

In Spain, Next Limit has participated in biotechnology research to simulate the heart as a complex fluid structural system.

== Awards ==
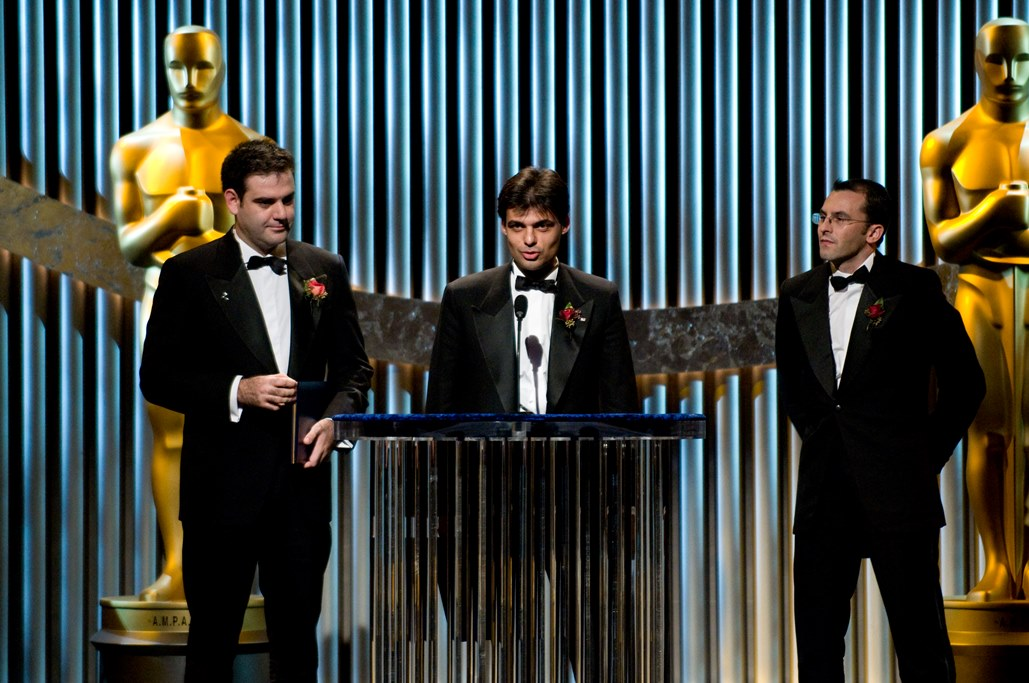
Next Limit Technologies - Academy Awards 2008

Year	Category	Awarded by	Result
2013	Mare Nostrum Award	Sociedad Científica Informática de España (SCIE) and the Congreso Nacional de Informática (CEDI)	Winner
2008	Technical Achievement Academy Award	Academy of Motion Picture Arts and Sciences	Winner
2008	Second Prize Chomón Award	Academia de las Artes y las Ciencias Cinematográficas de España	Winner
2006	Maxwell Render	Information Society Technology (IST) prize	Winner
2006	RealFlow	Information Society Technology (IST) prize	Winner

This was the second Technical Merit Oscar awarded to a Spanish person. The previous Oscar awarded to a Spanish person was Juan de la Cierva y Hoces in 1969 for his creation of the optic stabilizer Dynalens, an apparatus used to eliminate camera vibrations.

== See also ==
- Computational fluid dynamics
- Particle system
- Computer simulation
- Lattice Boltzmann methods
- 3D computer graphics
- Ray tracing
