= Jasmine Watson (jeweller) =

New Zealand jeweller

- Born: Jasmine Watson
- Education: Diploma in Jewellery Design, Unitec Auckland
- Known for: Jewellery

Jasmine Watson is a New Zealand jeweller.

== Education ==
Watson completed a Diploma in Jewellery design at Unitec Auckland in 1995, studying under jeweller Pauline Bern and glass artist Elizabeth McClure.

== Work ==
Watson's work is intricate and ornate, drawing on motifs from nature and symmetrical mandala forms. She is known for her use of Champlevé enamelling, and has won several prestigious awards, including the 'President Award' at the 44th International Exhibition of the Japan Enamelling Artist Association held at the Ueno Royal Museum, Tokyo, in 2011; and an 'Award for Excellence' at the 24th International Cloisonné Jewellery Contest, Tokyo.

Watson is also known for her work designing jewellery for film and television, including The Lion, the Witch and the Wardrobe and the Lord of the Rings trilogy. Although the titular ring for the latter films was made by Danish-born Nelson jeweller Jens Hansen, Watson created many other iconic pieces including the Evenstar pendant worn by Arwen.

Watson is associated with the Workshop 6 collective of contemporary jewellers, based in Kingsland, Auckland. Jewellers previously affiliated with this group include Octavia Cook, Areta Wilkinson, Jane Dodd, and Lisa Walker.

== Collections ==
Watson's work is held at the Auckland War Memorial Museum.
