= RealFlow =

Software

Realflow

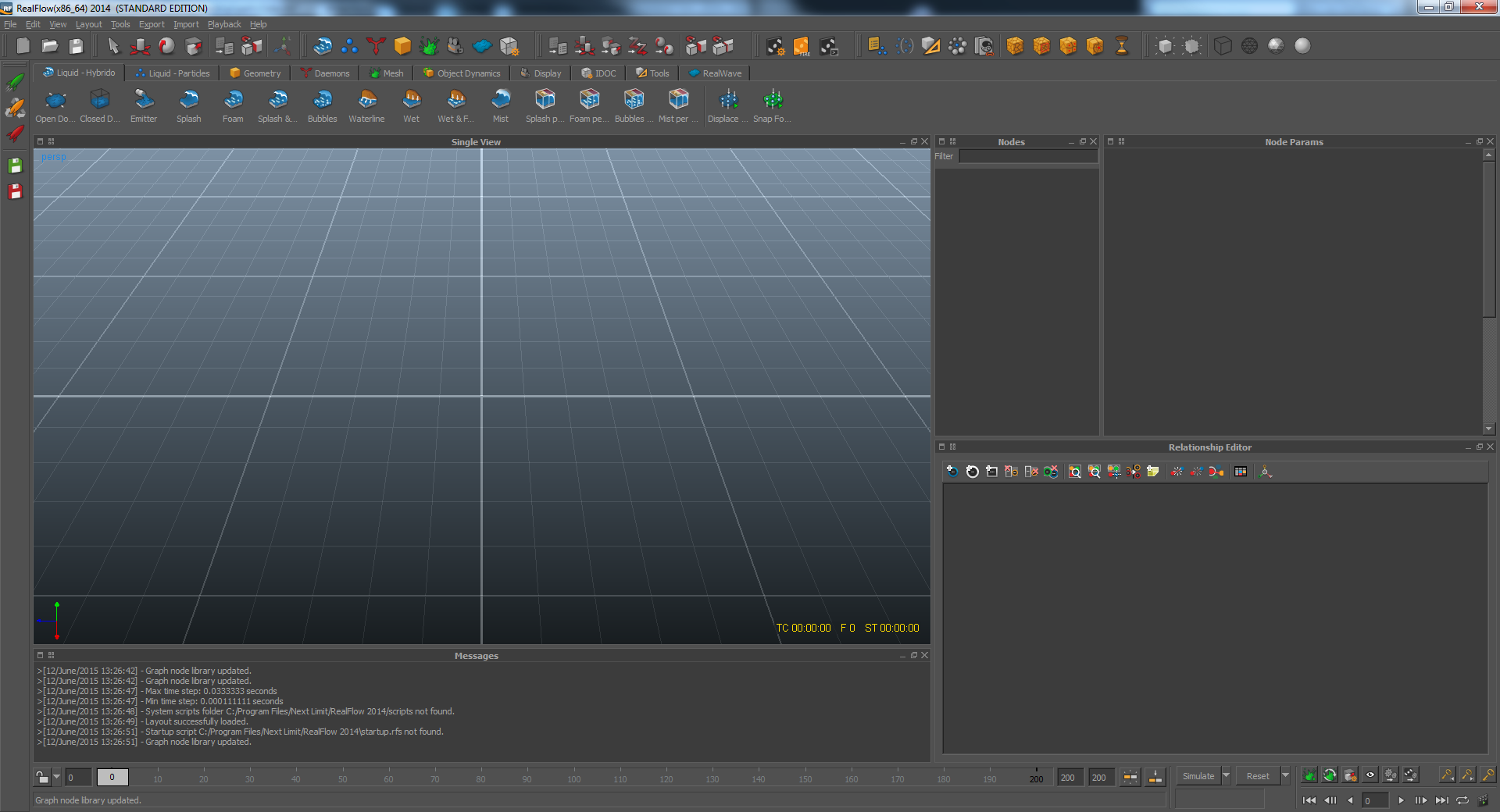
- Realflow 2014 running on Windows 7
- Developer: Next Limit Technologies
- Release: 1998
- Stable release: 10.1.2.0162
- Operating system: Windows, macOS, Linux
- Type: Fluid simulation, 3D computer graphics, computer physics engine
- Website: realflow.com

RealFlow is a fluid and dynamics simulation tool for the 3D and visual effects industry, developed by Next Limit Technologies in Madrid, Spain. This stand-alone application can be used in conjunction with other 3D programs to simulate fluids, water surfaces, fluid-solid interactions, rigid bodies, soft bodies and meshes. In 2008, Next Limit Technologies was awarded a Technical Achievement Award by the Academy of Motion Picture Arts and Sciences for their development of the RealFlow software and its contribution to the production of motion pictures. In 2015, Next Limit Technologies announced the release of RealFlow Core for Cinema 4D.

== Overview ==
RealFlow technology uses particle based simulations. These particles can be influenced in various ways by point-based nodes (daemons) which can do various tasks such as simulate gravity or recreate the vortex-like motion of a tornado. RealFlow can also simulate soft and rigid body collisions and interactions. The inclusion of Python scripting and C++ plug-ins allows users to program their own tools to improve RealFlow capabilities, adding control to most aspects of the RealFlow workflow including batch runs, events, daemons, waves, and fluids.

The RealFlow Renderkit (RFRK) is a set of tools designed to facilitate the rendering of fluids. The RFRK enables the generation of procedural geometry at render time and the rendering of individual fluid particles. With this interface, fluids can also be rendered as foam and spray.

On July 30, 2015, RealFlow 2015 was released to the public. The main features in this major release include:

- An increase in the quality of simulations.
- New DYVERSO solvers and GPU acceleration.
- Direct-to-render feature using Maxwell Render.
- Enhanced User Interface
- More controllabitlity: new splines nodes, text tools, daemons falloff, crown daemon, and spreadsheets
- DYVERSO solvers and rapid OpenVDB meshing speed up simulation times by 10x.

== Plug-ins ==
=== RFConnect ===
RFConnect is a connectivity plugin between standalone RealFlow and DCC applications. The plugin is a successor of RF Connectivity and RF RenderKit (RFRK). The plugin supports following DCC applications: 3ds Max, Maya, Cinema 4D, and Houdini. The plugin is also available for Lightwave and Softimage but the development is currently not active.

=== RFCore ===
RFCore is a plugin for bringing RealFlow functionality to the DCC applications. The plugin supports following DCC applications: 3ds Max, Maya, and Cinema 4D.

=== Third-party plug-in developers ===
Next Limit lists three 3rd party plugins for Wetwork, IoSim, and V-Motion.

== Version history ==
1998	RealFlow 1.0; RealWave 1.0; RealFlow 1.2
1999	RealFlow 1.3
2000	RealWave 2.0
2001	RealFlow 2.0
2002	RealFlow 2.5
2004	RealFlow 3.0
2006	RealFlow 4.0
2010	RealFlow 5.0
2012	RealFlow 2012
2013	RealFlow 2013
2014	RealFlow 2014
2015	RealFlow 2015
2016	Cinema4D
2017	Cinema4D 2.0
2018	Cinema4D 2.5; RealFlow | Maya; RealFlow | 3ds Max
2019	Cinema 4D 3.0; RealFlow 10.5

== Features ==
=== RealFlow ===
- Particle based solver (liquid, gas, elastic and particles)
- Interaction bitmaps
- Custom particle behaviour
- UV data and weight maps
- UV texture mapping
- Automatic mesh generator
- Force fields
- Python / C++ plugins
- Direct-to-render feature
- OpenVDB meshing

=== Hybrido ===
- Hybrid fluid solver technology to simulate large bodies of water with secondary effects such as splashes, foam, and mist

=== Caronte ===
- Rigid/soft body dynamics solver
- Mix animation and dynamics

=== RealWave ===
- Physically accurate water surfaces

=== Python scripting / C++ plugins ===
- Daemons
- Waves
- Fluids
- Events
- Batch runs

=== Dyverso Solvers ===
- Drastic speed-up on simulations
- Smooth layered meshes,

== Use in industry ==
Motion pictures

- Watchmen
- The Curious Case of Benjamin Button
- Sweeney Todd: The Demon Barber of Fleet Street
- National Treasure: Book of Secrets
- City of Ember
- Meet the Robinsons
- 300
- Primeval
- Poseidon
- The Guardian
- Ice Age: The Meltdown
- X-Men: The Last Stand
- Slither
- The Da Vinci Code
- Chicken Little
- Robots
- The Incredibles
- Constantine
- Charlie and the Chocolate Factory
- The Matrix Reloaded
- The League of Extraordinary Gentlemen
- Spy Kids 3-D: Game Over
- The Lord of the Rings: The Return of the King
- Freddy vs. Jason
- Minority Report
- Final Fantasy: The Spirits Within
- Ice Age
- Lara Croft: Tomb Raider
- Lost in Space
- Pompeii
- Jack Ryan: Shadow Recruit
- The Great Gatsby
- The Girl with the Dragon Tattoo
- The Avengers
- Looper
- The Impossible
- Resident Evil: Retribution
- Dredd
- Ice Age: Continental Drift
- The Pirates! In an Adventure with Scientists!
- The Lorax

Television series

- Lost
- CSI: Crime Scene Investigation
- Get Ed
- Rome
- One-T video clips: "Tomorrow's War" and "Kamasutra"
- U2/Green Day video clip: "The Saints are Coming"
- Numberjacks
- Waybuloo

Direct-to-video

- Hermie and Friends

Commercials

- Kraft Mac & Cheese
- Discovery Channel
- Coca-Cola
- Harpic
- Amp'd Mobile
- Strathmore Water
- Cinnamon Toast Crunch
- Nissan GT-R
- Bacardi
- Nickelodeon
- Mercedes
- Sony Ericsson
- Renault Laguna
- Nescafe Nespresso
- Frosted Flakes
- Chase Bank
- Guinness
- Heineken
- Grand Marnier
- Ariel Washing Powder
- Biotherm
- Vichy
- Nescafe
- Pontiac
- Gatorade
- Carlsberg
- Telia Xpress/Motorola
- Martini
- BMW
- Land Rover
- World of Color

Video games

- Ryse: Son of Rome
- Crysis 2
- Uncharted 3: Drake's Deception
- God of War: Ascension
- X-Men Origins: Wolverine (video game)
- Mass Effect 3

== See also ==
- Particle system
- Smoothed particle hydrodynamics
- Computer simulation
- 3D computer graphics
