= Elizabeth McClure =

New Zealand glass artist

Elizabeth McClure (born 1957) is a New Zealand-based glass artist who was born in Lanark, Scotland.

McClure was formally educated at the Edinburgh College of Art receiving a Diploma in Art (Glass Design) in 1979 and a Post Graduate Diploma in 1980. McClure has lived, taught and exhibited internationally in Japan, UK, USA, Australasia and Iceland. After completing her studies, McCLure worked at a number of UK glassmakers and from 1985 to 1986 McClure taught glass design in Japan. During the 1990s McClure lectured at Auckland's UNITEC and between 2005 and 2009 was the MFA studio supervisor at Whitecilff College of Art, Auckland. Between 1991 and 1993 McClure held the presidents position of Ausglass, an example of her involvement within the contemporary glass movement. Helen Schamroth writes, 'McClure's glass reflects her diverse background, and reveals a broad vocabulary of skills including blowing and casting'.

== Recognition ==
- 2000–1: Inaugural Thomas Foundation Award The Dowse Art Museum, Lower Hutt NZ
- 1996–7: Awarded fellowship to the Creative Glass Centre of America for 3-month residency
- 1996: Awarded glass prize, NZ Glass and Ceramic Awards, Artex Art XPO, Auckland
- 1995: Awarded Toi Aotearoa Arts Council Grant

== Selected exhibitions ==
- 2013 Auckland Art Fair represented by FHE Galleries, Auckland
- 2013 Wheaton Glass: The Art of the Fellowship Creative Glass Centre of America's
- 2013 LANDSCAPE: Masters of Glass Sabbia Gallery, Sydney, Australia
- 2012 From Pupil to Master Solomon Fine Art Gallery, Dublin, Ireland
- 2007 The Scots in New Zealand Museum of New Zealand Te Papa Tongarewa Wellington
- 2004 Southern Exposure: NZ Glass Survey Ebeltoft Glass Museum, Denmark
- 1999 The Best of New Zealand Glass Axia Modern Gallery, Melbourne, Australia
- 1998 Pacific Light: International Movements in Glass Auckland Museum
- 1996 Venezia Aperto Vetro Museo Correr, Venice, Italy
- 1994 Little Jewels James Cook Hotel, Wellington
- 1993 World Glass Now Museum of Modern Art, Sapporo, Hokkaido, Japan
