= Brighton Open Air Theatre =

Open-air theatre in Brighton and Hove, England

- B•O•A•T
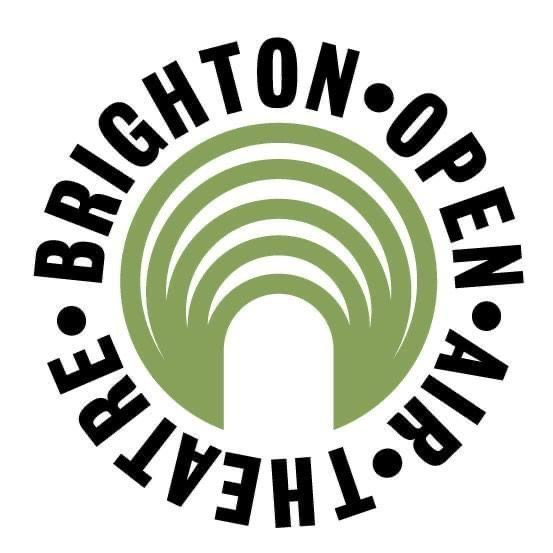

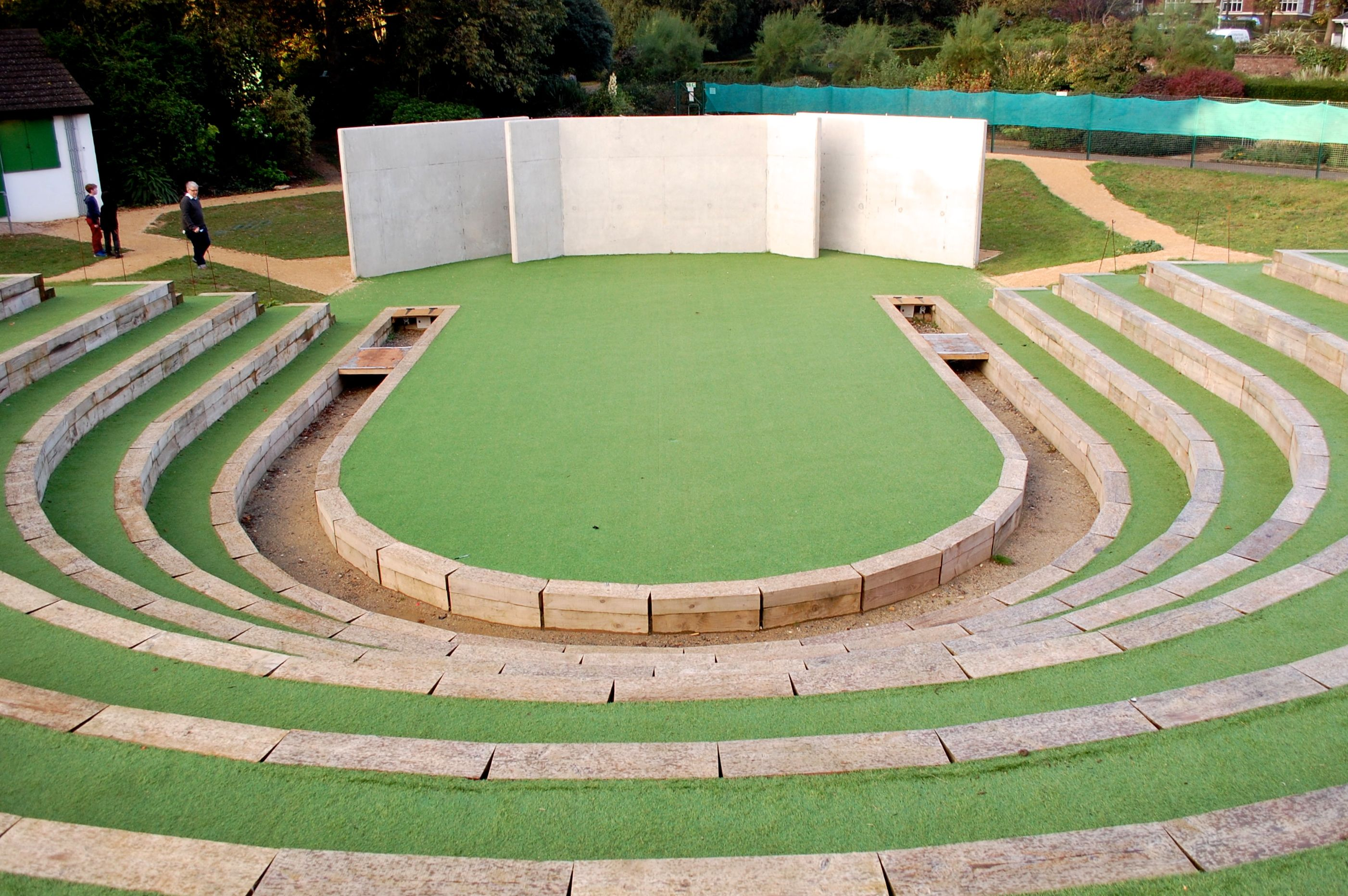
- Brighton Open Air Theatre in October 2016
- Interactive map of Brighton Open Air Theatre
- Location: Dyke Road Park, Brighton, England
- Coordinates: 50.83613°N 0.1538°W
- Capacity: 425
- Type: Outdoor theatre

Construction
- Opened: 9 May 2015

Website
- www.brightonopenairtheatre.co.uk

Brighton Open Air Theatre, also known as B•O•A•T, is a British theatre built in Dyke Road Park, Brighton, England, which opened on 9 May 2015. It has been paid for not by corporate funding or public grants, but by private donations. The theatre is the legacy of the Brighton showman and construction manager, Adrian Bunting, who died of pancreatic cancer, aged 47, in May 2013.

The theatre's radical design, conceived by Bunting, has a long thrust stage, which brings the actors out into the audience space. This has inspired the design of more recent open air theatres, including the Downlands School Theatre in Hassocks and the Thorington Theatre at Sutton Hoo in Suffolk.

In 2016, the Tatler placed the theatre in its list of the UK's six best outdoor theatres, while the Guardian included it in the 'Top 10 outdoor cinema and theatre events in the UK'. In 2017, the Brighton Open Air Theatre was number three in Curtain Call's list of the world's ten best outdoor theatres, after Shakespeare's Globe and Epidaurus. In 2019, B•O•A•T was number two in the Guardian's list of '10 great UK open-air theatres you can visit on public transport'.

== Adrian Bunting ==
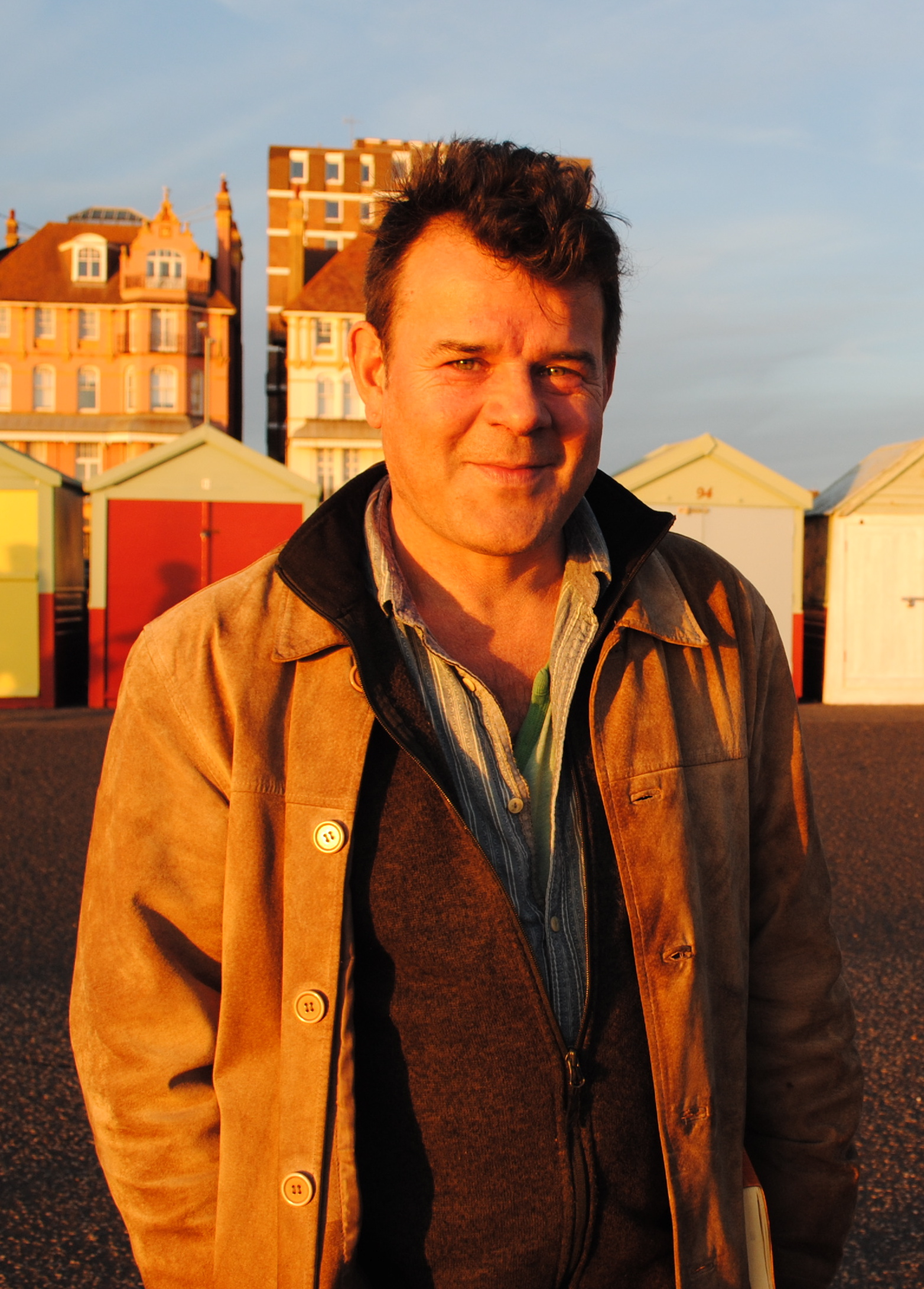
Adrian Bunting on Hove seafront in November 2012

Adrian Bunting was a buildings project manager, working on the refurbishment of the Brighton Dome and designing and project managing the construction of hotels in Africa and the Caribbean. He first became involved in theatre in the early 1990s, when he created and presided over Brighton's Zincbar Cabaret. His Guardian obituary recalls, 'The Zincbar, staged every fortnight at the Basement Club in the city, was a gloriously unpredictable crucible into which both gold and rubbish were thrown: comedians, poets and situationists alike. Adrian celebrated all, rousing the audience at the end of each act with: "Wasn't that magnificent?"

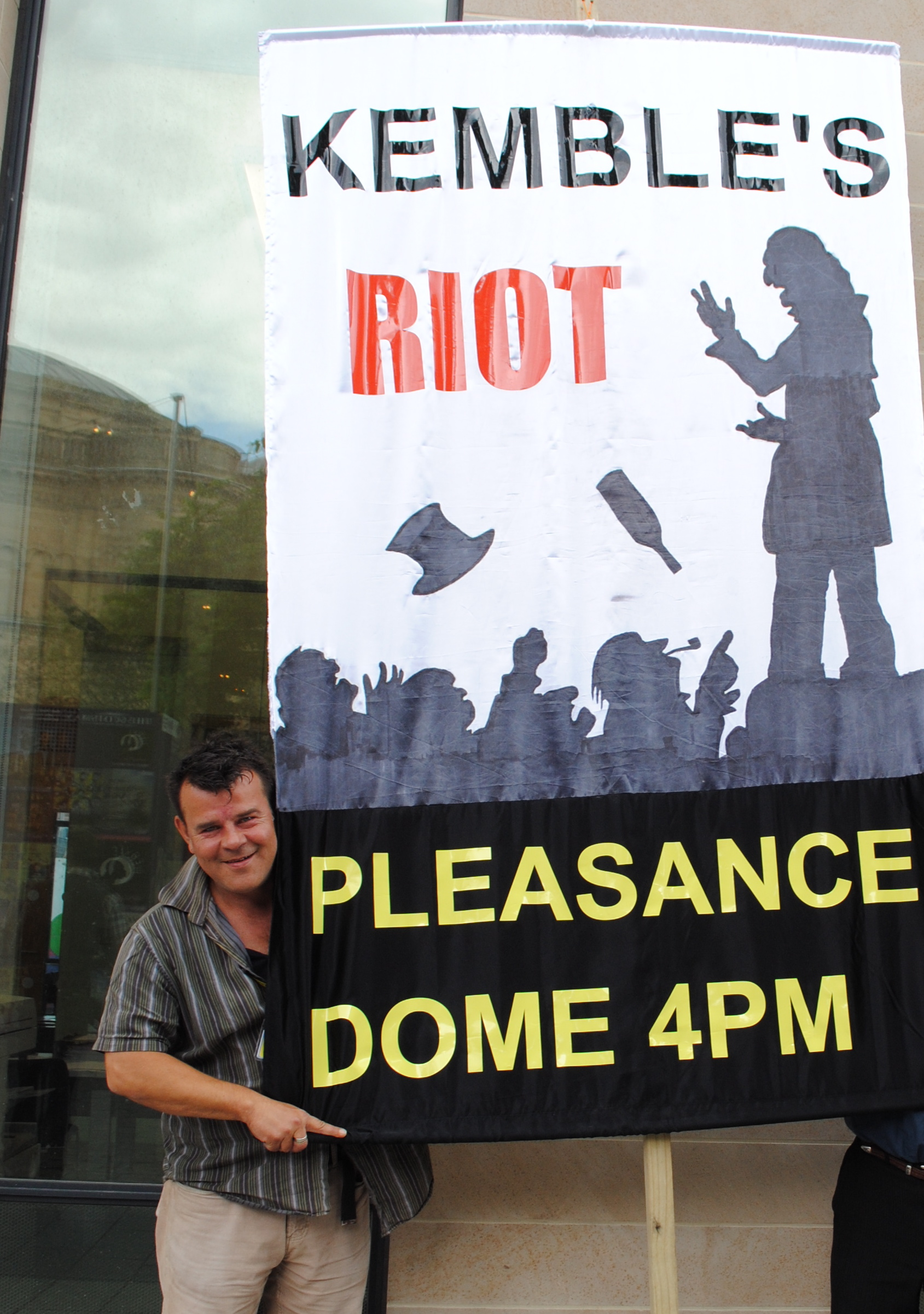
Adrian Bunting promoting Kemble's Riot in Edinburgh in August 2012

In 1996, Bunting created the street theatre installation The World's Smallest Theatre, which led to a well publicised battle with Marcel Steiner's Smallest Theatre in the World when both were programmed at the Pleasance in Edinburgh. He was one of the founding members of the Upstairs Theatre Company and a regular performer with the Festival Shakespeare Company as well as a writer and performer of comedy and theatre. In 2011, he wrote, directed and produced the play Kemble's Riot, which cast the audience as rioters taking part in the 1809 Covent Garden Theatre Old Price Riots. The play won the Best Theatre award at the Brighton Festival that year and a five star review from Fringe Guru. It went to the Edinburgh Fringe in 2012 and the New York Fringe in 2013.

Bunting had a long-held ambition to create an open-air theatre for Brighton, and had even identified the perfect location, the bowling lawn on Dyke Road Park. In April 2013, when Bunting was diagnosed with incurable pancreatic cancer, he learned that the bowling lawn was being closed by the council, which was looking for a new use for the space. Interviewed six days before his death, he said, 'The bowling lawn was always the place that I dreamed of. It's a magical place, with its own copse, hidden from the world...I always dreamed of putting it there. But of course it was a bowling lawn. You've heard about my unfortunate illness...(that) combining with the fact that the bowling green is no longer needed was too big a coincidence to think about. I really think that Brighton deserves an open-air theatre...that one of the most artistic towns in England can have a theatre that it can be proud of, alongside all the big beautiful theatres inside...And this is a chance for us to make one, and look after it, and enjoy it for the whole of the summer. This is when the tourists come, this is when people want to go outside, in June, July and August and watch great theatre.'

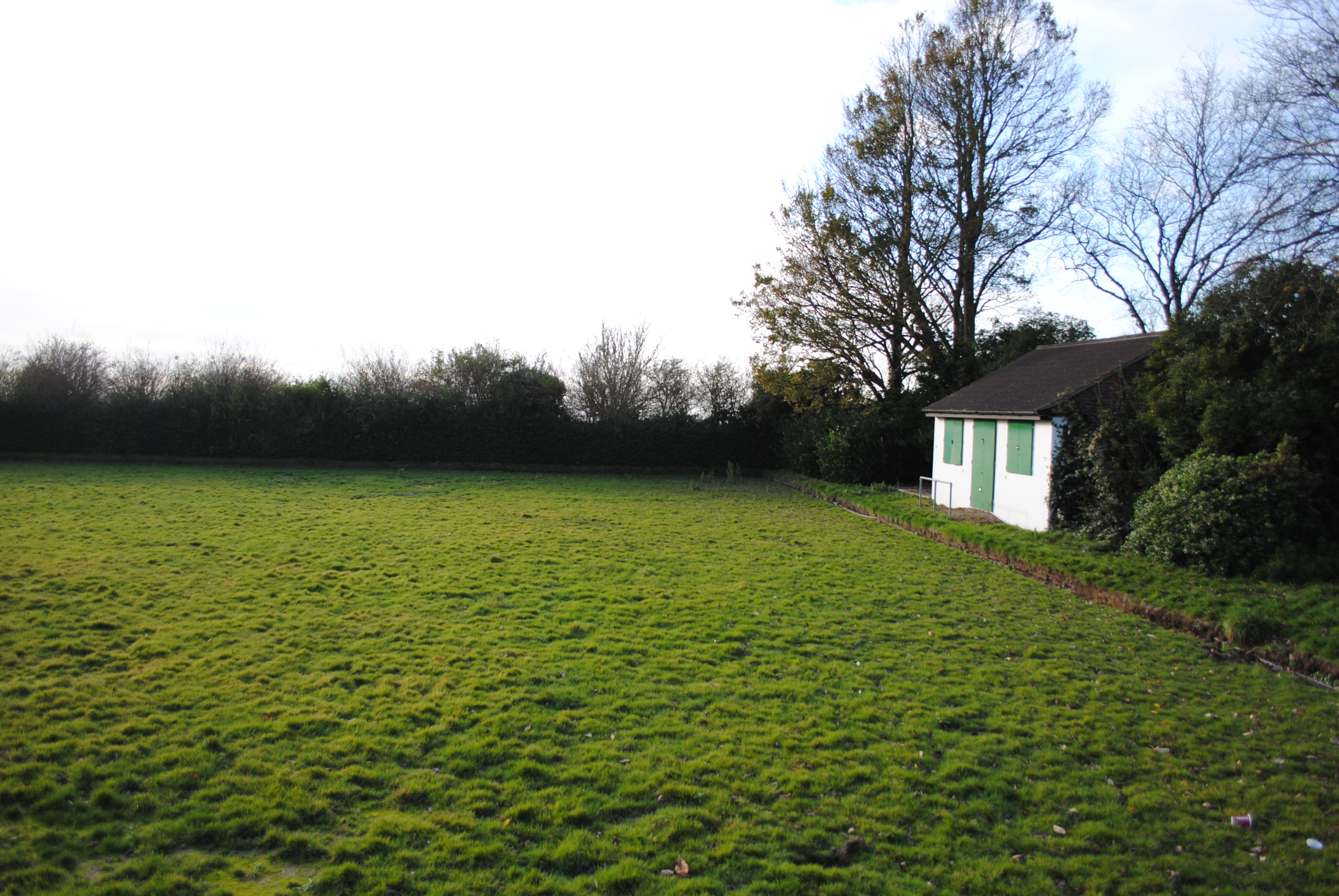
The old bowling green in November 2013

In his last weeks, Bunting initiated the theatre designs and arranged for his life's savings (£18,000) to be left to the project. He then brought together a team of five friends to help create it after his death. The BOAT team was made up of Steve Turner, construction manager, James Payne, television writer, Ross Gurney-Randall, actor and playwright, Donna Close, Arts Manager and Producer, and Claire Raftery, theatre director. James Payne told etc magazine, 'If anyone else had asked, you would have said 'we will do our best' but couldn't make any promises, but Adrian was one of those people that, if he asked, you would move heaven and earth for.'

In March 2015, Bunting was one of 24 celebrated Brightonians honoured by having their names on the front of the new bus fleet. His friend Dan Wilson said, 'There are few greater Brightonian accolades than having your name on a bus and Adrian would have been delighted.'

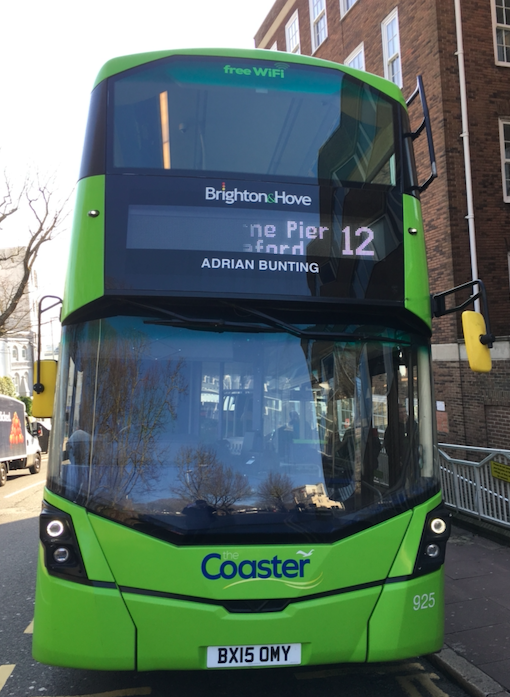
Brighton and Hove Bus: Adrian Bunting

== History ==
=== Winning Support ===
Creating a theatre was a long and difficult process. The BOAT team first had to win the backing of the local community organization, The Friends of Dyke Road Park; to register BOAT as a charity; and to secure planning permission from Brighton and Hove Council.

=== Fundraising ===
BOAT supporters organised several fundraising events. The biggest was the BOAT benefit at the Dome, on 16 June 2013, featuring Stewart Lee, Tim Vine, Simon Evans, Joanna Neary, Mark Thomas and Susan Murray as MC. James Payne told etc. magazine, 'Adrian gave such a lot when he was alive. People feel they owe him so they came and performed for free. The benefit raised over £20,000 doubling our funds over night.'

The Dome show was followed by a Zincbar Reunion evening in the Spiegeltent, as part of Brighton Fringe on 23 May 2014. Performers from the original Zincbar cabaret, many of whom had not been on stage in years, revived their old acts. A third benefit, 'Toast the Boat', was held at The Old Market, Hove, in December to celebrate the granting of planning permission. Acts included Simon Evans, Tom Binns (who first performed at Zincbar), Susan Murray and MC Guy Venables, joined by many original Zincbar performers.

In March 2015, there was an online auction, BidforBoat, in which dozens of artists donated more than 60 works to be sold for the theatre. The artists who contributed include the cartoonists Chris Riddell and Guy Venables; the comic/graphic novels illustrator Clint Langley; the designer Cressida Bell; the film director Darren Walsh; the oil painter Sam Hewitt; and the television writer Graham Duff. The auction raised £13,605.59.

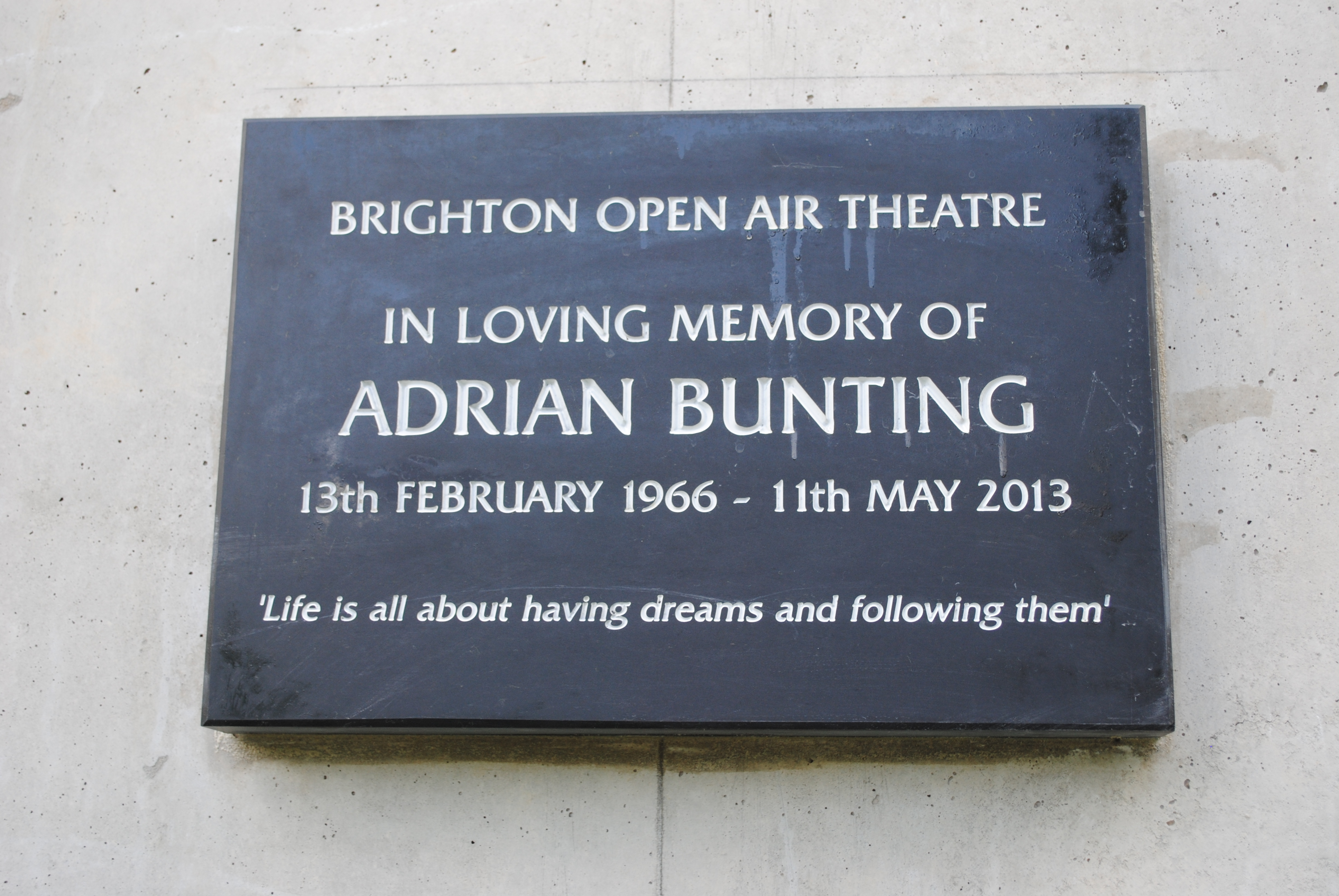
The Acoustic Wall of the theatre carries this memorial plaque

Apart from the big fundraising events, there were many other generous donations. The Crescent pub at 6 Clifton Hill raised more than £1,000 from its regular quiz for BOAT. The Crescent was Bunting's favourite pub, and he often took part in the quiz, as well as performing as occasional quizmaster.

=== The Theatre ===
The theatre's final design was the work of the architect, Graeme Hawkins, of the Miller Bourne partnership, who offered his services for free. BOAT resembles a classical Greek theatre, with semi-circular banks of seating looking down at a performance space. Its lawned terraces, with seating for 425 audience members, lead down to a sunken flat thrust lawned stage, creating an intimate connection between the actors and the audience. A concrete sound wall behind the stage provides an acoustic cushion and a back stage wall for exits and entrances.

=== Launching the BOAT ===
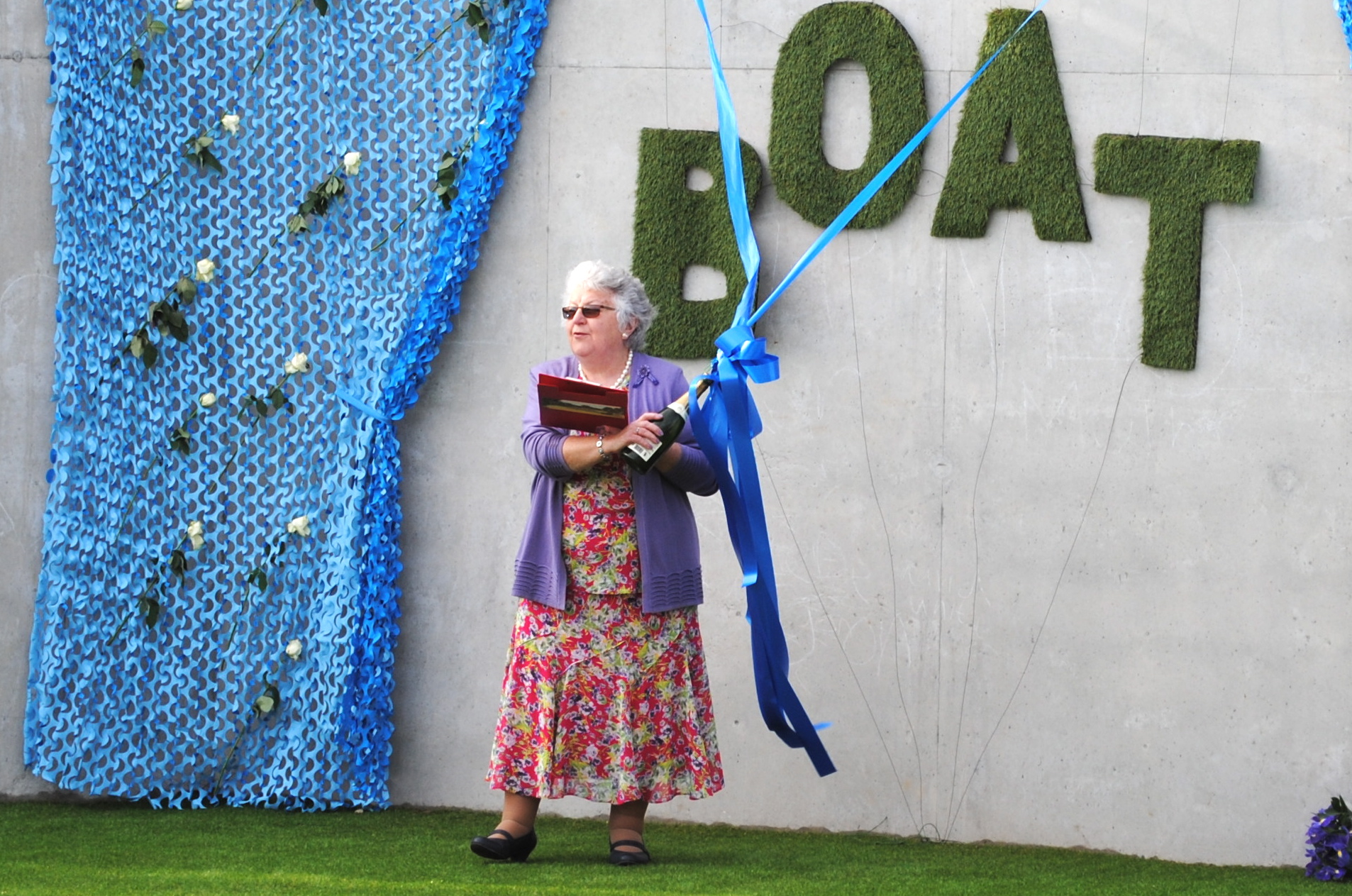
Isobelle Bunting launches the BOAT

BOAT opened on 9 May 2015, with a gala night, featuring Flick Ferdinando, Nick Pynn, Joanna Neary, Richard Durrant, Simon Evans, Steve Wrigley, Glenn Richardson, Dan Atkinson and the Brighton Early Musical Community Choir (with which Bunting sang). The theatre was formally launched by Adrian's mother, Isobelle Bunting.

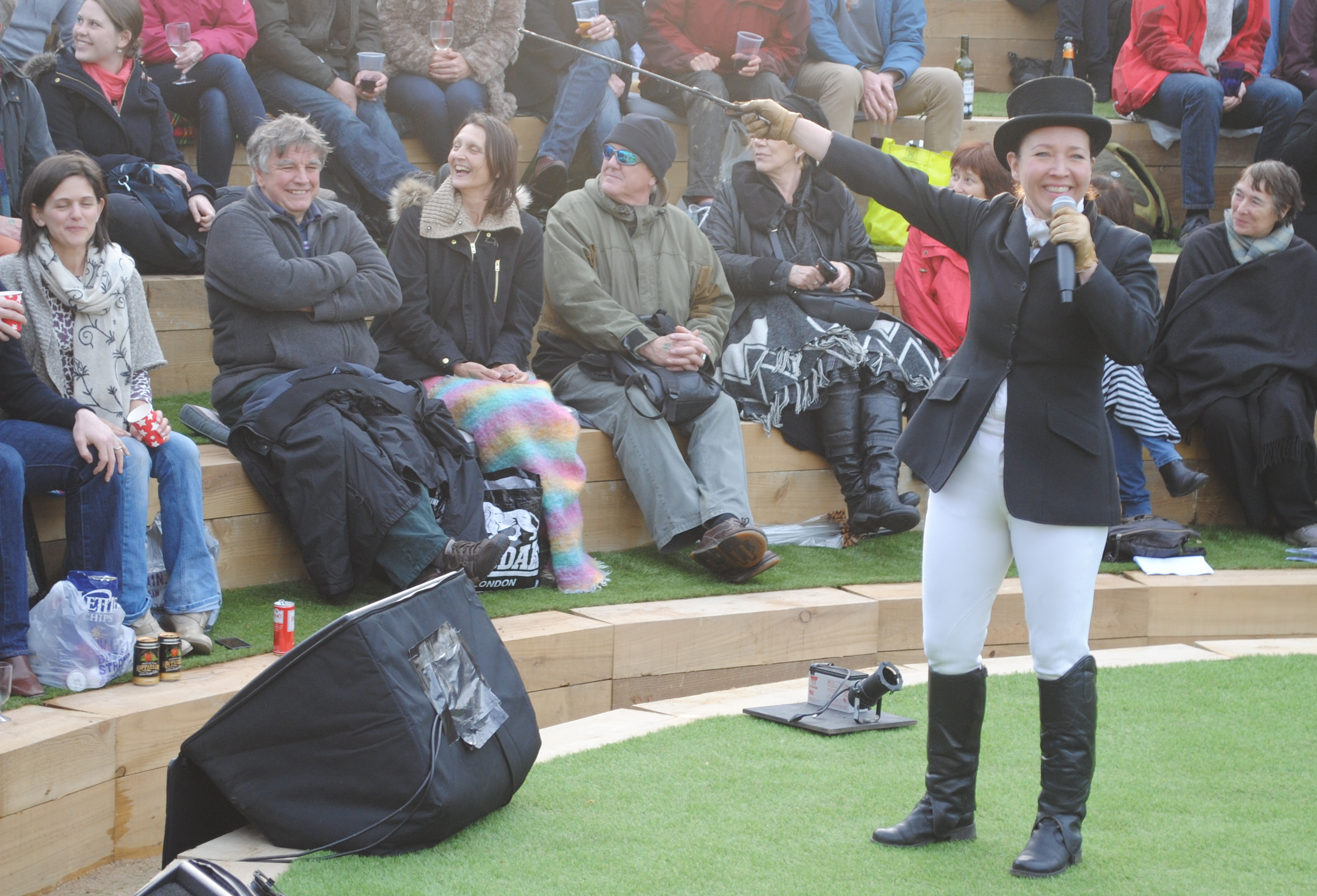
Flick Ferdinando comperes the gala opening

Since the opening of the theatre, the venue has been used to stage further fund-raising events. Boost the Boat, on 3 July 2015, was an evening of stand-up comedy, starring Tim Vine, Shane Richie, Simon Evans, Joanna Neary, and George Egg.

=== Amanda Redman ===
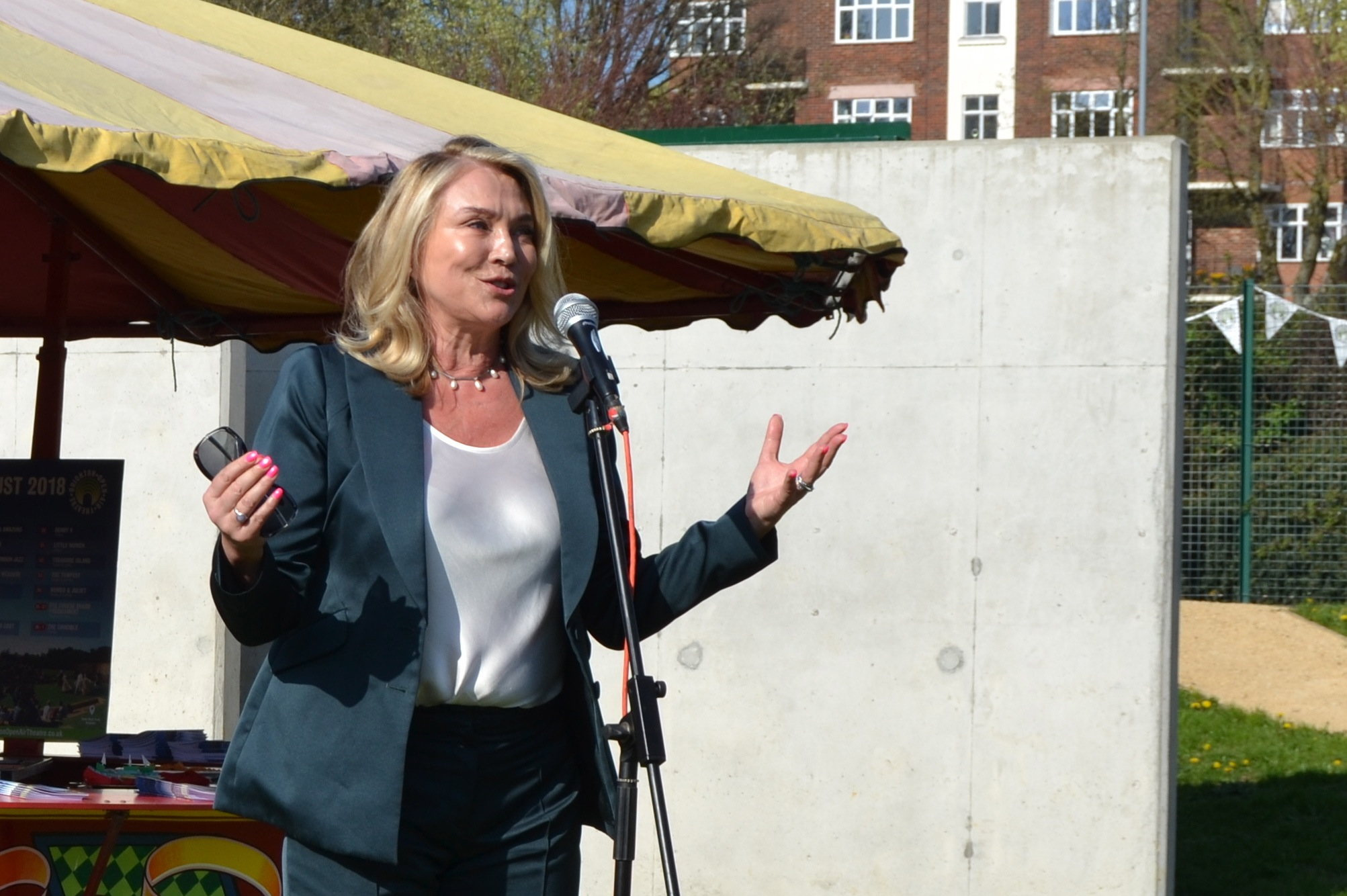
Amanda Redman at the press launch of BOAT's 2018 season

In 2018, the actress Amanda Redman, who was born in Brighton, became the theatre's new patron. She told the Argus, 'My stepfather used to bowl right here where the theatre is and my mother used to live in Dyke Road. When I was told about the history of this place I was incredibly moved. Whenever there is a venture where people are honestly trying to put something back into the community, you have to help however you can.'

== Programmes ==
=== Programming policy ===
According to the BOAT website, the theatre 'will operate from the beginning of May to the end of September each year and will provide a space for local artists alongside national touring productions. The programme will primarily be theatre and spoken word but will also include screenings and public talks. Uniquely the exact programme will be chosen by lottery to ensure that it remains accessible and open to all comers.' James Payne told Viva magazine, 'Adrian's artistic policy was that there is no artistic policy. He wanted everyone to have a chance.'

=== 2015 ===
The first production staged was Romeo and Juliet from Shakespeare's Globe, from 13 to 16 May, as part of Brighton Festival. In May, the BOAT team announced the appointment of the playwright, Brian Mitchell, a close friend of Bunting's, as Manager of the theatre. For the summer of 2015, Mitchell programmed Radio City Theatre, The Merry Wives of Windsor, Twelfth Night, Our Mutual Friend, The Eunuch, As You Like It, Madame Butterfly, Iolanthe, Hamlet, the Nettle Knickers Puppet Show, Trumpton Comes Alive!(a musical celebration of Trumpton), The Tragedian, Prodigal Theatre's trilogy about Edmund Kean, Shakespeare in a Day, The Brighton Beach Boys, and Kemble's Riot.

The Merry Wives of Windsor, 15 July 2015, with David Mounfield as Falstaff

In September, as the season drew to a close, the BOAT team reported on its Facebook page, 'Some rough number crunching reveals the combined audience across Brighton Open Air Theatre's inaugural season exceeds 7,000. With limited funds for marketing it's a remarkable figure.'

=== 2016 ===
In 2016, Anne-Marie Williams took over from Mitchell as the new manager of BOAT. The 2016 programme, running from May to September, included Dr Faustus, Medea, Antigone, Don Giovanni, Heartbreak House, The Importance of Being Earnest, Tess of the D'Urbervilles, Ruddigore, Much Ado about Nothing, Hamlet, The Canterbury Tales, As You Like It, Frankenstein, The Revenger's Tragedy, Sense and Sensibility, Ros Barber'sThe Marlowe Papers, Gulliver's Travels, a musical tribute to David Bowie, Sunday in the Park with Jazz, A Midsummer Ceilidh, and a concert by the Soweto Spiritual Singers.

As part of the May Brighton Festival, Laurie Anderson, artistic director for 2016, staged the UK premiere of 'Music for Dogs' at BOAT. This was a '20-minute piece... specifically designed for the canine ear, including frequencies audible only to dogs' The show, performed to an audience of around 100 dogs and their owners, was pronounced a 'howling success' by the Argus.('Performances greeted by howls rarely receive five star reviews, but when they are accompanied by wagging tails and barks of approval the show's rating goes without saying.')

On 19 June, the theatre was the setting for Lifeboat, a family fundraiser for refugees. The money raised went to the School Bus Project, converting buses into mobile schools to provide teaching in the Calais Jungle Camp.

In July 2016, BOAT hosted the Starboard Festival, a new festival of outdoor performance by, for and with children and young people from 0 to 21. Over 16 days, 20 different shows were staged, as well as workshops in playwriting and performing. Festival founder Naomi Alexander told the Latest that she was inspired by seeing a show at BOAT: 'I wanted to do something that would enable children and young people in the city to discover this magic for themselves and for BOAT to become part of their psychogeography of the city.'

=== 2017 ===
In 2017, the comedian Simon Evans joined BOAT as a patron, and also hosted BARKING! a stand-up comedy show for dogs. The 2017 programme included The Comedy of Errors, The Plain Dealer, The Tempest, The Wind in the Willows, Othello, Blue Remembered Hills, The Merry Wives of Windsor, She Stoops to Conquer, A Midsummer Night's Dream, Peter Pan, The Mikado, The Lost World, Richard III, Pride and Prejudice, Three Men in a Boat, Romeo and Juliet, Macbeth, Twelfth Night, Cosi Fan Tutte, and Earthquakes in London.

=== 2018-19 ===
Each year, BOAT's programme expanded. In 2018, there were more than 130 performances running from May to September. Genres included theatre, comedy, dance, rock, jazz, opera, world music, cabaret, and children's shows. The Globe players on tour offered a choice of three plays: The Merchant of Venice, The Taming of the Shrew and Twelfth Night, to be selected by an audience vote. The canine theme from previous years was continued with The Great Houndini, Brighton's first dog-friendly magic show.

The 2019 programme was bigger still, with 140 performances from 70 different companies. The Globe players returned bringing a choice of three plays exploring the themes of refuge and displacement:The Comedy of Errors, Twelfth Night and the rarely performed Pericles Prince of Tyre. Dog lovers were offered a Pop Bingo Disco - Doggy Style, billed as the world's first bingo for dogs'.

In 2020, Anne-Marie Williams left to manage Shoreham's Ropetackle Arts Centre. According to the Brighton and Hove Independent, in the four years she managed BOAT its audience rose from 4,000 to 25,000 per year.

In January 2020, Will Mytum took over as BOAT's new manager. Mytum, previously theatre programme coordinator at London's Actors Centre, told the press, 'Living five minutes from the venue, I fully appreciate the positive impact BOAT has had in its short history on the local community as well as the wider arts sector, and it will be a real honour to help continue the legacy as we look to break new ground in 2020.'

=== 2020 ===
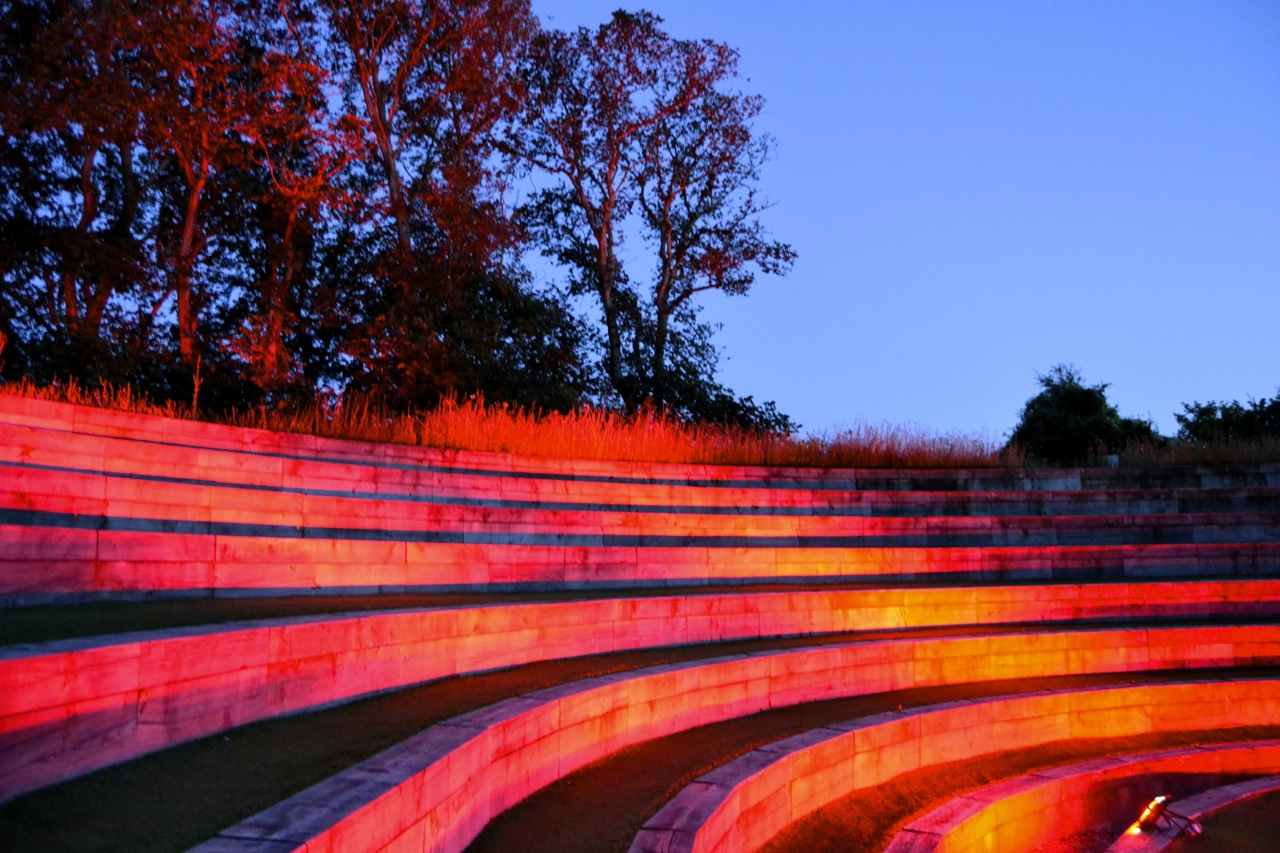
BOAT takes part in #LightItinRed on 6 July 2020

For 2020, BOAT's planned programme comprised 141 shows from 62 companies, due to run from May to September. However, due to the COVID-19 pandemic, all theatres were closed as part of a national lockdown, from March until July. The lockdown was relaxed in July, when pubs were allowed to open. Interviewed in The Stage, Will Mytum said, 'If pubs are able to open from July 4, it stands to reason that open-air theatres should be able to as well. The risk of virus transmission is lowered exponentially in an outdoor environment and with the relevant Covid-secure measures in place, open-air venues would be far safer than any beer garden.'

On 6 July, BOAT took part in #LightItinRed, a national action in which hundreds of venues were lit up in 'emergency red', drawing attention to the plight of the UK's live event and entertainment industry.

Three days later, the culture secretary Oliver Dowden announced that outdoor performances, with a limited and socially distanced audience, could resume from 11 July. The first show of the season was 'BOAT Unlocked', a cabaret performance on 25 July.

In 2020, the programme extended into the winter for the first time, with productions of Hansel and Gretel (A Postmodern Pantomime) and The Snow Queen

=== 2022 ===
After two years of disruption, BOAT returned in 2022, with a new box office and toilet building, with a crew room for volunteers, and a full programme of 119 shows, beginning, for the first time, on 8 April and lasting until 25 September.
