= The Ministry of Biscuits =

Musical Comedy

The Ministry of Biscuits is a musical comedy, written in 1997–98 by the playwright and composer Brian Mitchell and the author and illustrator Philip Reeve, with a filmed section directed by Ben Rivers. It mixes Ealing comedy and the light music of the 1940s with a dystopian setting inspired by George Orwell's Nineteen Eighty-Four.

== Writing ==
According to Mitchell, in the mid 1990s, the two writers were working on a different project, when Reeve handed him a chocolate ginger nut, 'sparking a quip about the 'ministry of biscuit ideas' from which the entire musical was born.'. From the first draft, Mitchell knew that the plot was so absurd that it could only be staged as a musical. He told Daily Brighton that, though he had studied music at University, he had a piano that he hadn't touched for seven years, but as soon as he began working on The Ministry of Biscuits, "music started to bubble out of me". Mitchell's score was inspired by British Light Music and the Ealing comedy scores. The overall effect, Mitchell says, 'is as if Georges Auric, after writing the score for Passport to Pimlico, 'had not stopped and had written a load of songs'.

Philip Reeve has written on his blog that 'The Ministry of Biscuits was the moment when I found my feet as a writer. I knew while we were working on it that it was better than anything I'd done before. I suppose I could say that I had finally "found my own voice".'

== Plot ==
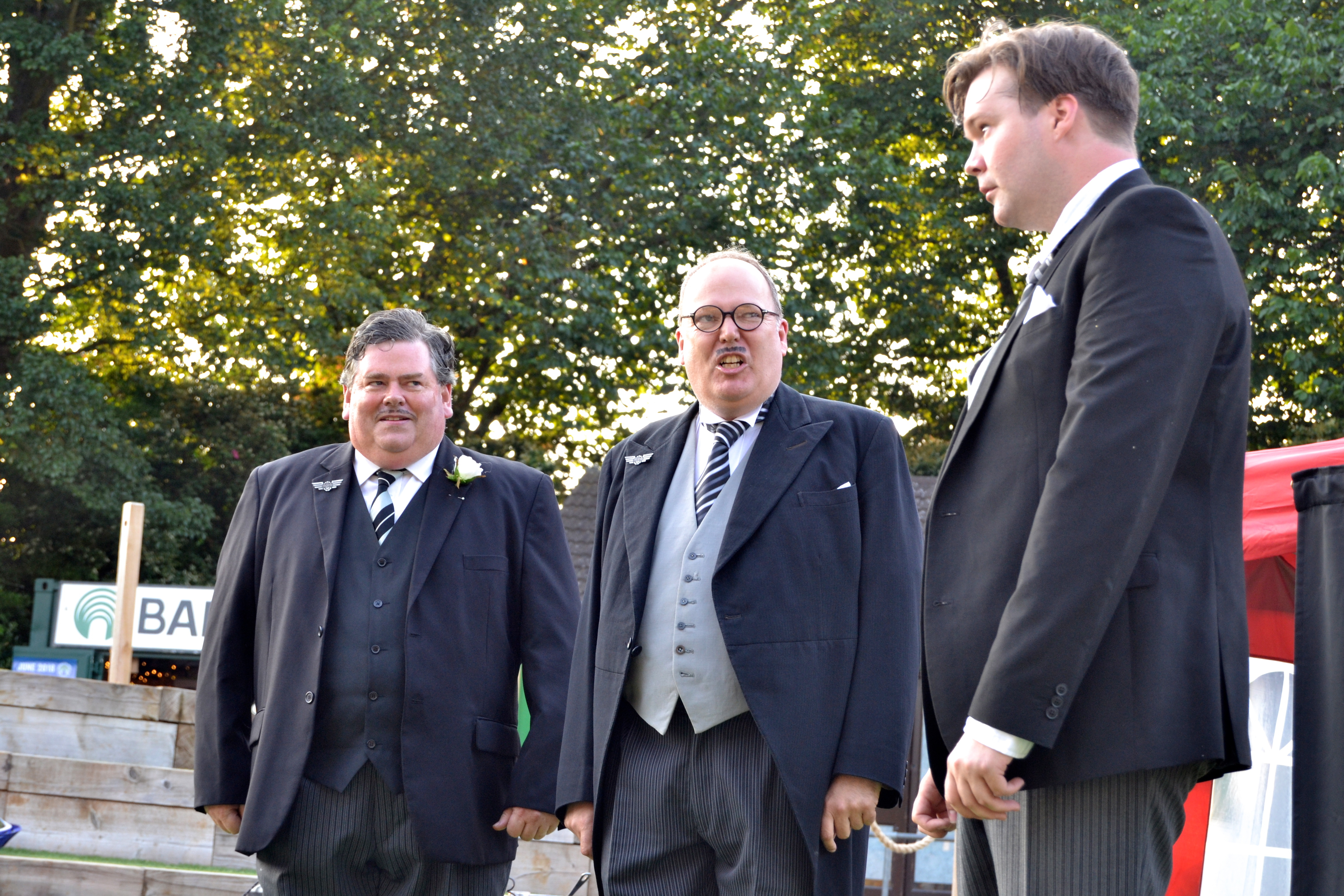
David Mounfield, Brian Mitchell and Murray Simon in The Ministry of Biscuits at Brighton Open Air Theatre, 6 July 2018

The story is set in a parallel grim post-war Britain of the late 1940s, where The Ministry of Biscuits aims to 'control biscuits, and to control the idea of biscuits.' It prohibits decadent sweetmeats, such as the Gypsy Cream and the Jaffa Cake. The hero, Cedric Hobson, a meek junior biscuit designer working on the recipe for a thinner, drier Rich Tea Finger, falls in love with his new French secretary, Françoise Celestine Courvoisier. He resolves to win her heart by creating a biscuit 'to shake confectionery to its very foundations'.

== Production and reception ==
The musical was first produced by Quirk Theatre and Film during the 1998 Brighton Fringe Festival, where it was staged at the Pavilion Theatre. The cast comprised Nicholas Quirke (the Minister), Sam Hewitt (Cedric Hobson), Joanna Neary (Francoise Courvoisier), David Mounfield (Babbington) and Claire Raftery (Dr Wischwinge/Radio Announcer). The live score was performed by the Janski String Quartet under the direction of Jason Pegg. Clea Smith and Briony McIlroy appeared as dancing biscuits. In her review in The Stage, Jan Whitehead wrote, 'What an absolute ripping yarn - a top hole musical comedy without a sniff of Lloyd Webber anywhere....This fringe show played to full houses at the Pavilion and was a festival gem.'

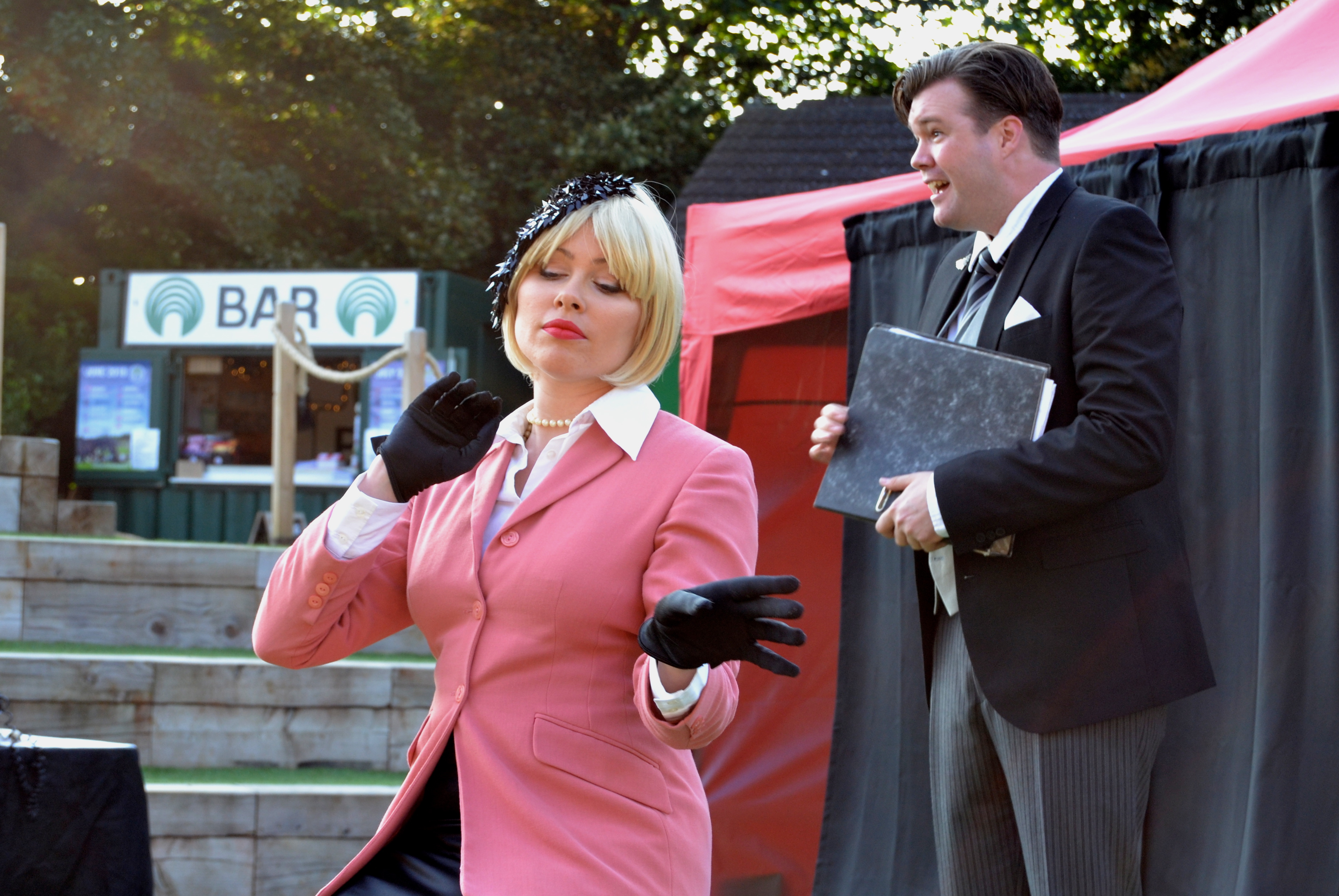
Amy Sutton and Murray Simon in The Ministry of Biscuits at Brighton Open Air Theatre, 6 July 2018

In 1999, the show went on tour to the Yvonne Arnaud Theatre, Guildford; The Miskin, Dartford; The Library Theatre, Eastbourne; The Brook Theatre, Chatham; Trinity Theatre and Arts Centre, Tunbridge Wells; Riverhouse Barn, Walton-on-Thames; and Gilded Balloon 2 for the Edinburgh Fringe Festival. In the Edinburgh Evening News, Liam Rudden reviewed an Edinburgh show: 'This musical is probably the silliest thing on the fringe. And it's the freshest comedy in years. Absolutely hilarious, it's played with complete conviction by a totally professional company in the style of an Ealing comedy.'

In a 2005 revival, at the Sallis Benney, Brighton, Ian Shaw played the Minister and Peta Taylor played Dr Wischwinge and the Radio Announcer. The music was performed by a piano quintet comprising Andy Smith, from Hot Chocolate, on piano with the Giddey Quartet. The musical director was Stephen Wrigley.

A third revival was staged at the Lantern Theatre in Brighton in November 2017. The performers in the Lantern production were Murray Simon (Cedric Hobson), Amy Sutton (Francoise Courvoisier/Dr Wischwinge), Brian Mitchell (the Minister) and David Mounfield (Babbington/Radio Announcer). Andy Smith again played the piano, accompanied by the cast on toy piano, melodica and drums. From March 2018, the revival toured the UK.
