= Jo Neary =

British comedian, writer and actress

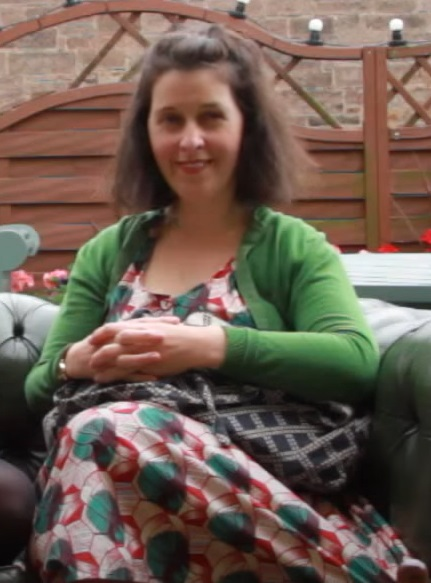
Neary interviewed in 2015

Joanna Neary is a British comedian, writer and actress. Her solo, character-based stage shows include Youth Club and Joanna Neary Is Not Feeling Herself, which received a Perrier Best Newcomer award nomination in 2004. She has also appeared in the TV shows Time Trumpet, Angelo's, That Mitchell and Webb Look, Skins, Dogface, Man Down and Ideal. Radio credits include acting as an ensemble member of the cast in the first series of the Count Arthur Strong Radio Show, as well as appearing in numerous series of the Radio 4 show Out to Lunch.

Harry Deansway, writing in The Guardian, described Neary as "a character actress par excellence; not only are her characters well observed and immaculately performed, but they are well written and, most importantly, funny. ... A Joyce Grenfell of our age".

== Education ==
Neary grew up in Redruth, Cornwall. She told The West Briton, "After leaving Pool School I did an art degree at Falmouth and became interested in performance art. I decided that people tying themselves together naked and walking across the Great Wall of China was the way to go." She went on to study visual and performing arts at the University of Brighton, where she wrote plays and performed her first character-based comedy shows. As well as writing her own material, she also acted in plays and sketches written by Brian Mitchell and Joseph Nixon. Many of the songs in her shows are written by Mitchell. Neary has said, "I don't like comic songs particularly but I do love singing and dancing about."

== Early career ==
In 1998–99, Neary played the female lead, a French femme fatale, in The Ministry of Biscuits, a dystopian comic musical by Brian Mitchell and Philip Reeve. The musical was first performed in Brighton, followed by a national tour including a visit to the 1999 Edinburgh Festival Fringe. It was revived in Brighton in 2005 and again in 2017.

In 2001, Neary teamed up with fellow Brighton character comedian, Graham Darg, to create Sean Hard vs Craft Woman, which they performed at Komedia Southside in the Edinburgh Festival Fringe.

In 2003, Neary performed with David Mounfield and Brian Mitchell in the sketch show, Take This and Shove It, at the Smirnoff Underbelly, Edinburgh. The sketches, including Tarzan and Jane and The Wombles, were written by Mitchell and Nixon. Neary also performed some of her own character pieces, including Celia, based on the female protagonist in Brief Encounter.

== Solo shows ==
In Neary's debut Edinburgh solo show in 2004, she appeared as multiple characters, including Mr Timkins (a sly cat mourning the recent loss of his "dingle"), a bespectacled dolphin commenting on news stories from a soggy newspaper, and her own mother and grandmother. She told The Scotsman, "The animals all started off with a dolphin which was an inflatable toy that I found in a bargain bin in a charity shop for a pound. It was my size so I slit it down the back, made a hole for my face and climbed inside it. Then I walked around my flat doing a silly voice and imagining what a dolphin would talk like."

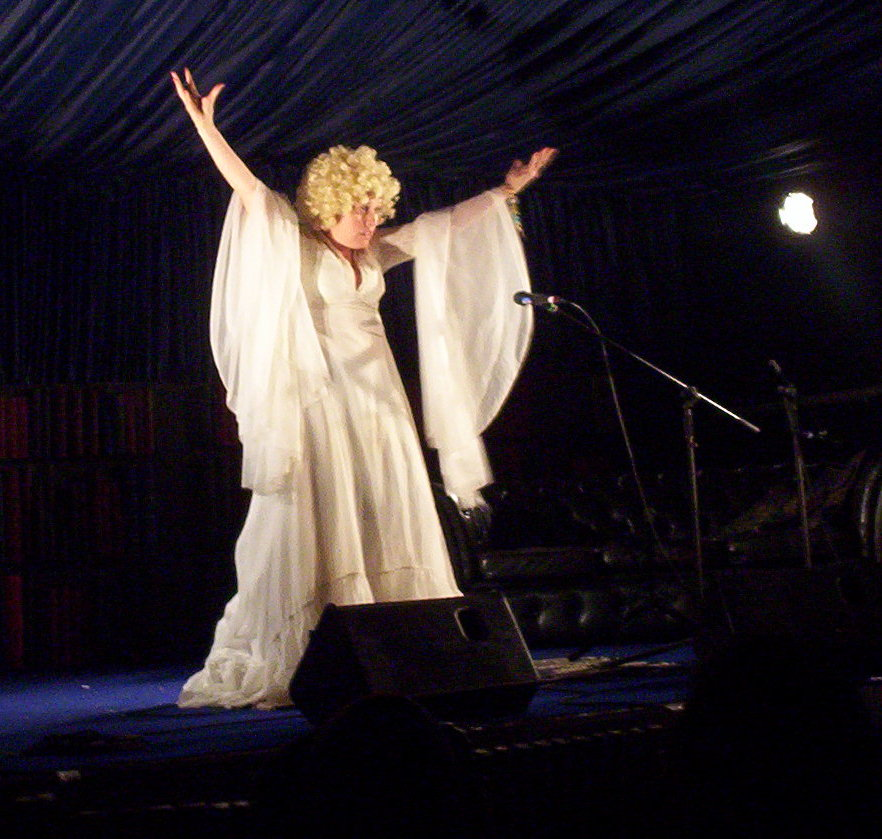
Neary performing as "Pan's Person"

According to the review in The Scotsman, "(her) Pan's People pastiche of "I Can't Live if Living Is Without You" is worth the price of the ticket alone as she rhythmically mimes her way through every method of suicide available." Brian Logan, in The Guardian, wrote, "There's one strong comic character after another in Joanna Neary's solo Fringe debut, which can feel like a one-woman Fast Show ... Neary's alter egos are the products of a highly individual imagination." The show was nominated for the Perrier Newcomer Award and won the Comedy Report Best Character Actress Award.

For her 2005 Edinburgh show, Neary was directed by David Sant of Peepolykus. She created a cast of new characters, including Les Miserables, the Aussie comic, Lee, an 11-year-old deer, who is looking forward to starting rutting even though he doesn't know quite what it entails, and Fiona, the gap-year student who likes bongos but is worried about global dimming. According to The Scotsman's review, "Her range of accents is amazing – she convincingly does no less than nine different English accents, yet the obvious choices of Brummie or Geordie are nowhere to be heard.'

Neary returned to Edinburgh in 2007 with her third solo show. Alongside the familiar characters, such as Celia Johnson, she created Chris, a swinger from Portslade, Björk singing a song about the property market, and Carol Streep, a nervous woman giving a talk on sex aids. The show was framed with readings from Neary's own teenage diaries, with stories of "life in Eighties Cornwall with a loose tooth and Lady Di haircut and the many boys that steadfastly ignored her." Stephanie Merritt reviewed the show in The Observer: "For character comedy that is glorious fun with no underlying point whatsoever, Joanna Neary's Little Moments (Pleasance) would be hard to better. Neary is a fiercely gifted actor and her short monologues are peppered with clever songs and silly dances. The real joy here is the character based on Celia Johnson in Brief Encounter, a pitch-perfect impersonation taken to its logical conclusion. This is a show that leaves you with a huge smile and a renewed sense of delight in daftness.'

Neary's fourth Edinburgh show, in 2008, was reviewed by Brian Donaldson in The List: 'Whether Neary... is being a cat or a dolphin, impersonating celebrity chefs or transforming herself into bonkers old Björk singing about the credit crunch, each scene is infused with intricate details, layered by pinpoint writing and heightened with a highly polished performance.' New characters included the celebrity chefs Heston Blumenthal and Delia Smith. In one new sketch, written by Joseph Nixon, she appeared as a Katharine Hepburn type American actress, who says "My only regret is turning down Gone with the Wind... and sleeping with Hitler." The show ended with another Pan's People dance, this time to the Charles Aznavour song "She".

For her 2011 show, Youth Club, Neary drew again on her teenage years in 1980s Cornwall, and created a completely new set of characters. These were described by Colin Bramwell in Exeunt: "There are many memorable characters on offer here: Mr. Eddy, the youth club leader who annunciates each word with a new dance move; Eva, the madrigal-adapting new-girl from exotic Birmingham; Diana, the centrepiece of the story, who enjoys singing rude songs on the toilet and making things out of Weetabix boxes, and who fancies Gary, who knows the word for kite in Swahili... To effortlessly switch between a whole ensemble of characters takes considerable skill, and Neary pulls it off with no small amount of aplomb. Her talent for physical comedy is also impressive. The simulation of a young girl attempting an impromptu dance to a destroyed tape of the latest pop hit is both sympathetic and hilarious."

== Celia ==
Neary's most popular and lasting character creation is the repressed housewife, Celia, based on Celia Johnson's character in Brief Encounter. Writing in The List, Hannah Adcock commented "she dons a period hat and a perfectly modulated voice to become Celia Johnson. 'Arthur hasn't noticed' she confides, excitement ripening in her throat. 'He just thinks I'm an ordinary woman." Bruce Dessau, writing in Metro, described Celia as encapsulating "a lost age of repressed passion, snobbery and lumpy marmalade." In the Telegraph, Dominic Cavendish declared, "Her idea of crossing Celia Johnson's character from Brief Encounter with a contemporary (trapped) housewife – relaying her diary's 1940s-styled entries to us throughout the show – is so inspired, and beautifully executed, it deserves its own Radio 4 series."

In 2007, Neary made a short film as Celia, Brief Encounter of an Ordinary Woman, with John Sackville as Trevor Howard. It was filmed by the BBC Reversioning Unit for BBC Mini Movies, and directed by Vanessa Frances.

For Neary's 2015 show Faceful of Issues, she remained in character as Celia, now the host of The Toxborough Village Hall Chat Show, in aid of the animal hospital for a kitten who needs an iron lung. The show features "topical talks, showbiz exclusives, celebrity interviews – plus a local locksmith's bawdy confessions, a recipe for air soup, and a photograph of a conker." It was nominated for Best Show at the 2016 Leicester Comedy Festival. Reviewing the show for Chortle, Steve Bennett wrote "In her compelling performance, Neary has impeccable comic instincts. The pauses are just perfect, and she knows when to ride a laugh, when to hold out for more, and when to move on swiftly. Faceful Of Issues is pretty much a Radio 4 comedy waiting to happen, both mocking and appealing to the middle-class demographic."

== Joanna Neary Does Animals and Men ==
Neary's 2016 Edinburgh show took the form of a PowerPoint presentation. Tim Wilcock described the show in Fringe Review: "art and education emerge as the twin themes of this really wacky and almost anarchic hour of character comedy from a very talented young comedienne that comes thoroughly recommended."

== Visual and performance art ==
Neary is a regular collaborator with the visual and performance artist Mel Brimfield. In 2010, she appeared as the fictional performance artist, Alex Owens, in a series of photographs, later reproduced in Brimfield's book, This is Performance Art. In 2011, Brimfield staged a live performance, Barbara Hepworth > Henry Moore, at the ICA as part of Bob and Roberta Smith's exhibition "Women Should Be in Charge". Neary gave a lecture as the sculptor, Dame Barbara Hepworth.

Brimfield's 2012 exhibition, Between Genius and Desire, at the Ceri Hand Gallery in Covent Garden, dealt with the myth of the suffering male artist. It included a film, Clement Greenberg – Lee Krasner = Jackson Pollock, in which Neary played the role of Lee Krasner. According to the Ceri Hand Gallery's website, "Lee Krasner is re-imagined as a downtrodden, dowdy Home Counties frump and Pollock reduced to a helpless feral dog-like caricature – smashing things up, pissing on carpets, chasing balls and hanging his head out of the car window with his tongue lolling – a version of Pollock's much discussed alcoholism and primitive urges. Krasner puts up a relentlessly optimistic front despite Greenberg's blatant misogyny and the art world's complete disinterest in her as anything other than Pollock's carer."

== Other work ==
In September 2016, Neary performed at the Keep Corbyn rally in Brighton in support of Jeremy Corbyn's campaign in the Labour Party leadership election.

== Television and radio appearances ==
- Miranda (2013) Soft Play Teacher, BBC One
- Comedy Showcase episode "Coma Girl" (2011) Judith, Channel 4
- How Not to Live Your Life (2011) Belinda, BBC Three
- The Bleak Old Shop of Stuff (2011) Hooped Skirt Lady, BBC Two
- Sarah Millican's Support Group (2010) Marie, BBC Radio 4
- Brave Young Men (2009) Miss Violet, BBC Three
- Comic Relief sketch with Katy Brand (2009) Sadie Frost, BBC One
- Ketch! And HIRO-PON Get It On (2009) Love Interest, BBC Three
- 28 Acts in 28 Minutes (2008) stand-up, BBC Radio 4
- Katy Brand's Big Ass Show (2008) various characters, ITV2
- MeeBOX (2008) various characters, BBC Three
- No Heroics (2008) various characters, ITV2
- Angelo's (2007) Fan of Paul, Channel 5
- Biffovision (2007) Ruth de Deux, BBC Three
- That Mitchell and Webb Look series 2 (2007) various characters, BBC Two
- Out to Lunch series 2–4 (2006–7) Celia/various characters, BBC Radio 2
- Ideal series 2–7; 2006–11) Judith, BBC3
- Green Wing (2006) Florist, Channel 4
- Time Trumpet (2006) BBC Two
- Count Arthur Strong's Radio Show! (2005–6), various characters, BBC Radio 4
- Last Chancers (2004) Channel 4
- Man Down (2017) Milky Sue (s4 ep5), Channel 4
- How Are You? It's Alan (Partridge) (2025), Susan (s1 ep 2), BBC One
