= Brian Mitchell and Joseph Nixon =

British comedy writing duo

Brian Mitchell and Joseph Nixon are a British comedy writing team. They were head sketch writers on BBC Radio 4's Jo Caulfield Won't Shut Up and BBC1's Live and Kicking, and also wrote the TV comedy shows Slightly Filthy (LWT) and The Ornate Johnsons' Edwardian Spectacular (BBC4). Yet their main work is in the theatre. Their plays include Spy, Moonlight over India, Writ in Water, Metronome, Eurovision, Seven Studies in Salesmanship, The Opinion Makers, Those Magnificent Men and the multiple award-winning Big Daddy Vs Giant Haystacks.

The author and illustrator Philip Reeve, a friend and collaborator, has written: 'Two of the best writers I know are friends of mine from my Brighton days; Brian Mitchell and Joseph Nixon. Their expertly wrought comedy sketches decorate many an Edinburgh Festival and improve a few otherwise lacklustre Radio 4 comedy shows, but to see them at their finest you need to seek out their plays.'

Each has also worked with other writers. Mitchell has co-written three musicals, The Ministry of Biscuits, and Lord God, both with Philip Reeve, and Whaddya Know We're in Love with Jerry Rulf. Nixon is co-author, with Ian Shaw, of The Shark is Broken, a hit play of the 2019 Edinburgh Fringe.

== The Ornate Johnsons ==
A flyer/programme, designed by Philip Reeve, for the Ornate Johnsons Christmas Show at the Nightingale Theatre, Brighton, December 1993

Mitchell and Nixon met at primary school in a colliery village in Derbyshire, and started to write plays together when they were just fourteen years old. In 1988, Mitchell, a talented musician, moved to Brighton, to study composition at the University of Sussex. Nixon, following a degree in American Literature at the University of Essex, also moved to Brighton in the early 90s. It was in Brighton, in 1992, that they founded The Ornate Johnsons, a sketch troupe named after a character they had created in a Damon Runyonesque play set in 1920s USA. Mitchell told Time Out that their aim was 'to bring back energy, drama and extravagant performances to the world of sketch comedy; and to do stuff that wasn't political or PC. People forget how oppressively right-on everything was around 1989. All the shows have tended to be a collection of loosely linked songs and sketches that make no point beyond raising a laugh.'

The original members of the Ornate Johnsons were Brian Mitchell, David Mounfield and Laurence Relton, and they first performed at the Marlborough Theatre Brighton, in January 1992. They were later joined, at various times, by Glen Richardson, Paul Putner, Louise Law (née Judkins), Beth Fitzgerald, Jo Neary and Clea Smith. Nixon, familiarly known as 'the unseen Johnson', does not perform, 'although he makes an occasional Terry Gilliam-like appearance in a show.'

For BBC Southern Counties, Matt McGuire reviewed an Ornate Johnsons show at Brighton Festival in 2007: 'The OJs did what they always do: deliver genuinely fantastic, original, playful, surreal and dynamic comedy sketches, including bribery on the Starship Enterprise; football commentators' on the drama of a man stuffing a pie down his face in seconds; Only Fools And Horses, the opera; and a man who always finishes his girlfriend's sentences.'

In 2007, BBC4 broadcast the Ornate Johnsons' Edwardian Spectacular, recorded at Wilton's Music Hall. This was followed by a two-week run at the London Arts Theatre, where audiences were 'invited to follow the troupe through the pages of Edwardian history and join The Pankhurst Sisters on Tour, marvel at the devilish magicks of Aleister Crowley and gasp at Charles Rennie Mackintosh – Superhero! This one-hour show brings together the great events and discoveries of the day – from the exploration of the Polar Regions, via Pavlov's dogs, to the sinking of the Titanic. Not even the Great Houdini can escape. And there's a man with a wooden arse.'

== Three Short Plays about Shops and Love ==
A flyer/programme, designed by Philip Reeve, for Moonlight over India at the Nightingale Theatre, Brighton, 1994

In 1994, Mitchell and Nixon gave up sketch comedy to write a dramatic trilogy: Three Short Plays about Shops and Love. The first was Moonlight over India, a romantic comedy, in the style of Guys and Dolls, set in a 1950s New York drug store. The store is run by Harry, an artist at the soda fountain, whose greatest creation, which he calls 'Moonlight over India' is a 'Triple Chocolate – white, milk AND plain – Double Fudge, Chopped Walnut, Four Scoop Sundae.' The central character, Ed the Bean, is a chocoholic whose girlfriend, Myrtle, thinks it's childish for a man to be interested in candy. Ed is saved from Myrtle by Lara, a tough dame who also loves chocolate. They find love by sharing a 'Moonlight over India'.

A flyer/programme, designed by Philip Reeve, for The Bargain at the Nightingale Theatre, Brighton, 1994

The second play was The Bargain, a farce set in the 19th century Russia of Gogol and Chekhov. The central character is the pawnbroker, Riskin, a conceited, indecisive, half-wit who is planning a wedding proposal. Riskin lives with his disapproving mother, and the pair have a comic double act reminiscent of Galton and Simpson.

MOTHER: Dullard! Clod! Pinhead!

RISKIN: Ow!

MOTHER: Mental defective! Dimwit! Jackass!

RISKIN: Mother! One day you will run out of insults to level at me!

TATIANA: She has a book of them.

The plot has many comic twists and turns, commented on in soliloquy by Riskin: 'Oh, this is like the plot of some terrible novel! What's going on? Right – I must tackle this logically – I'm good at logic. Was it not I who recognised, in my early twenties, the important link between over-eating and obesity?'

The third play Metronome, took its setting, Paris in the 1960s, from Nouvelle Vague cinema. But the style was that of Terence Rattigan, as a sophisticated English couple, in the act of breaking up, visit a music store where the man buys a piano. Much is left unsaid. The woman says, 'If I think about it, my one real regret is that I shall leave here without you and I ever having had what might be termed a 'blazing row'.' The man replies, 'I understand these sort of public histrionics are currently very fashionable, in the theatre, anyway. One only has to walk past the Royal Court to risk being struck on the back of the head by a flat-iron.'

The reference to the Royal Court was an acknowledgement of how unusual such plays were in the early 1990s, when British theatre was dominated by experimental companies, like Théâtre de Complicité, and the extreme 'In-yer-face theatre' of the Royal Court. Rattigan was deeply unfashionable in the 1990s. But the Rattigan revival of 2011 suggests that Mitchell and Nixon may have been ahead of their time.

The three plays are very different in style, yet they share similar themes. The central male characters are indecisive ineffectual dreamers. Ed the Bean and Riskin are both overgrown children. The women are practical, decisive, and adult, and it is their decisions which shape the course of events.

Although conceived as a trilogy, only the first two plays were originally staged together, at the Nightingale Theatre Brighton, transferring to Komedia, Brighton, in 1995. The plays were both directed by Nicholas Quirke, who also played Riskin. Peta Taylor played Riskin's mother. In Moonlight over India Ed and Lara were played by Simon Merrells and Beth Fitzgerald, and Harry, the drug store owner, was played by Ross-Gurney-Randall.

The complete trilogy was finally staged in May 2004 at the Sallis Benney Theatre in Brighton. The production, directed by Brian Mitchell, had Ian Shaw as Ed the Bean and Duncan Henderson as Riskin. The man and woman in Metronome were played by Duncan Henderson and Beth Fitzgerald.

Moonlight over India was revived again in May 2019, at the Brighton Latest Music Bar, with a cast of Ross Gurney-Randall, Ian Shaw, Joshua Crisp, Amy Sutton, Penny Scott-Andrews and Nick Bartlett.

== Spy ==
Mitchell and Nixon's next play, Spy, was inspired by 1960s British spy films and TV series, including The Ipcress File, James Bond, The Saint, The Prisoner and The Avengers, with one scene echoing Alain Resnais's Last Year in Marienbad. The central characters are Stroud, another naive male, and Miss Eve, a femme fatale, who breaks into his office one day dressed like Miss Peel from The Avengers. She reveals to him that, for the previous fifteen years, he has been working for 'the largest intelligence organization in Chingford.'

The play was originally performed at the Nightingale Theatre, Brighton, in 1995, with Mitchell as Stroud and Clea Smith as Miss Eve. Mitchell and Nixon revived and revised it, in 2006, for the East Anglian Pulse Festival, with Duncan Henderson and Beth Fitzgerald in the lead roles. Lynne Mortimer reviewed the production in the East Anglian Times: 'This was a fabulously convoluted story about a Chingford based intelligence organisation and it required any number of paralyzing, knock-out and truth inducing drugs to be administered in the course of the action....Duncan Henderson is magnificent as Stroud, the hapless employee who has spent 15 years trying to avoid being noticed because he doesn't actually do any work. One day, he finds another woman has taken the place of his indisposed secretary – a woman who has a habit of kissing him....Probably no one is who they appear to be and, just when the audience imagines it may have worked out what is going on, it is tossed a googly as one twist in the tale is succeeded by another and then another....There have been many imitators and spoofs of the spy story, but none I think as clever and laughter-provoking as this one'.

== Those Magnificent Men ==
In 2010, New Perspectives produced Those Magnificent Men, Mitchell and Nixon's comedy about the first ever non-stop Transatlantic flight of Alcock and Brown. The play, directed by Daniel Buckroyd, originally had C.P.Hallam as Alcock and Richard Earl as Brown. Philip Reeve reviewed the play: 'Without ever being disrespectful to the real Alcock and Brown, they manage to turn their heroes into a classic British comedy duo in the tradition of Morecambe and Wise, with CP Hallam's Alcock the long-suffering straight man and Richard Earl's Brown the buffoon. And as if history and comedy were not enough, there are points where the characters step out of the action and era of the play to discuss the whole notion of biographical dramas, and shoot down in flames the recent trend for plays and films based on the lives of politicians, comedians and celebrities; works which twist the facts to make the story more interesting....This is a superb piece of theatre, beautifully written and engagingly acted, and it deserves to be widely seen. '

Julie Watterson, in The Stage, wrote, 'The production is full of laughter, pathos and ingenuity, with strong direction from Daniel Buckroyd and creative design by Helen Fownes-Davies, who uses basic trunks for a variety of clever purposes and facilitates the quirky construction of an amusingly credible version of the Vickers-Vimy-Roils aeroplane.'

When the play went to the 2011 Edinburgh Festival, Ian Shaw took over the role of Alcock.

In 2015, the play was revived with Mitchell in the role of Alcock and David Mounfield playing Brown. Richard Perry, reviewing a Leicester performance in the Western Park Gazette, said 'If you ever want to see the Charge of the Light Brigade performed in your living room, Brian Mitchell and David Mountfield [sic] could probably do it with sticks, a cushion and a flared nostril apiece....It's a very funny, hands on hips, chin jutting out into the sunset look at old fashioned British heroism and epic boys' own daring do in the face of insurmountable odds and near certain death.'

Ross Gurney-Randall and David Mounfield as Big Daddy and Giant Haystacks at the Brighton Media Centre, 2 March 2012 (photograph by Peter Chrisp)

== Big Daddy Vs Giant Haystacks ==
Mitchell and Nixon's 2011 play, Big Daddy Vs Giant Haystacks, is a comedy about the world of British wrestling, written for the actors Ross Gurney-Randall and David Mounfield. Gurney-Randall played Big Daddy, the 26 stone 9 lb wrestler famous for his feud with the 6 ft 11 inch tall Giant Haystacks, played by Mounfield.

Writing about real people usually means there is a wealth of material to draw on. Not in this case. Apart from mentions in a few ghosted autobiographies and tabloid newspaper interviews there was virtually nothing. This meant we had to look in some odd places for our data. We had our memories of course; we both remembered Big Daddy on 'Tiswas' and Kendo Nagasaki being unmasked. We remembered the spectacle of seemingly thousands of old ladies at a fever pitch of excitement by the ringside, waving their umbrellas in the air and chanting 'Easy easy!' It was this excitement we wished to transmit by translating wrestling into theatre. Which, of course, is what it always was.

The play was a big hit at the 2011 Brighton Festival, where it won a best actor award for Ross-Gurney Randall. At Buxton Festival, it won the Fringe Awards for Best Theatre Production and Best New Writing. In 2013, it went to the Assembly Rooms for the Edinburgh Festival, where Michael Coveney hailed it as 'a sharp and funny sketch show about the heyday (and Haystacks) of television wrestling, with some astute popular cultural referencing and more physical theatre than the entire dance programme at Summerhall (this year's seriously trending, and trendy, venue).'

Philip Reeve reviewed the play for The Solitary Bee:'Actors Ross Gurney-Randall and David Mounfield don't just portray Big Daddy and Giant Haystacks, but an immense supporting cast of lesser wrestlers, managers, and TV executives; there are even walk-on parts for Paul McCartney, Frank Sinatra and Princess Margaret....It's all as funny as we've come to expect from Mitchell and Nixon, but it's never just funny: they have a deep sympathy for the people they write about. Ross Gurney Randall's Big Daddy is particularly impressive; reluctant at first, then half believing his own publicity; his unease at having to visit the bedsides of dying children as part of his brother's publicity schemes, and his grief and guilt about the death of an opponent, are exceptionally well-drawn; he's almost a tragic figure (albeit a 26 stone tragic figure in a spangly leotard)'

Scenes from the play were included in the recent BBC4 documentary 'When Wrestling Was Golden'.

== Seven Studies in Salesmanship ==
In 2013, Mitchell and Nixon's Seven Studies in Salesmanship was staged at the Brighton and Buxton Festivals. The piece, featuring David Mounfield, Heather Urquhart, Jenny Rowe and Daniel Beales, was made up of seven short plays linked by the theme of selling. Graham Duff, writer of Ideal and Hebburn, reviewed the Brighton show: 'Matching big laugh-out-loud gags with touching moments of genuine poignancy, Seven Studies in Salesmanship is a beautifully crafted portmanteau production. Much more than just a satire of selling techniques, the show also grapples with narcissism, betrayal and obsession. From urban romantic entanglements to sci-fi vignettes and skewed Roald Dahl-esque morality tales, these stories frequently take unexpected twists and turns.'

== The Opinion Makers ==
Mitchell and Nixon's The Opinion Makers is a musical comedy about a market research company in Swinging Sixties London. The play, directed by Daniel Buckroyd, opened in October 2013 at the Mercury Theatre, Colchester, with a cast including Mel Giedroyc, David Mounfield and Julie Atherton. The Mercury Theatre website, which describes the play as 'Mad Men meets Carry On', provides this synopsis: 'When the utterly incompetent team at Fernsby Market Research find themselves facing the stiffest challenge of their professional lives – to report what the British Public really think of world famous 'Doctor Campbell's Lotion' in readiness for a re-launch – there's only one thing for it; make it all up! After all, that's what market research companies do, isn't it?'

The Colchester production received mixed reviews. Revived for the Brighton Festival in May 2014, with Mitchell himself directing, it was more successful, winning an Evening Argus Angel award. Tom Locke, reviewing it in the Argus, wrote, 'Whether there will be a wittier, better crafted or more entertaining show at the Fringe this year remains to be seen, but Brighton boys Brian Mitchell and Joseph Nixon have set the bar high....This performance was sold out and the reaction at the end was unanimous – a hit!'

== Gilbert (No Sullivan) ==
In 2016, for the 180th anniversary of the birth of W. S. Gilbert, Mitchell and Nixon wrote a stage adaptation of some of the 'Tall Tales and Bonkers Ballads' he contributed to Punch and Fun magazines. Gilbert (No Sullivan) includes three stories (The Finger of Fate, The Burglar's Story and Foggerty's Fairy) and two Bab Ballads (Annie Protheroe and The Yarn of the Nancy Bell). The show, performed by Mitchell and David Mounfield, toured in Autumn 2016. According to Louise Schweitzer, in the Argus, 'Mounfield and Mitchell romped with minimum props and maximum gusto through Gilbertiana....It was a very clever show from two enormously talented and very funny actors.'

== The Ingoldsby Legends ==
In 2019, Mitchell and Nixon adapted Richard Harris Barham's The Ingoldsby Legends, supposedly written by Thomas Ingoldsby of Tappington Manor. The play has two actors, playing the moralising cleric Barham and the immoral Ingoldsby, who retell four legends: 'The Smuggler's Leap', 'Sir Rupert the Fearless', 'The Hand of Glory' and 'Look at the Clock!'. In December 2019, BBC South East Today broadcast a piece on the show, with interviews with the authors and clips in which Brian Mitchell played Barham and David Mounfield played Ingoldsby. It was first performed at the Rialto, Brighton, on 15 December 2019, with Brian Mitchell as Barham and Ross Gurney-Randall as Ingoldsby. The play was then revived in February 2024, with performances at Presuming Ed's in Brighton and the Sheppey Little Theatre in Kent. Murray Simon now played Barham while Mitchell took over the role of Ingoldsby. In her Broadway Baby review, Susanne Crosby described the show as "fabulously fast-paced, jam-packed full of content and brim full of hilarity...It’s as if someone put The Woman in Black in a blender with Morecambe and Wise and this is the result." Mike Aiken, writing in Brighton Source, said that it was "a wild, accessible, crazy performance."

== Underdogs ==
in 2022, Mitchell and Nixon wrote Underdogs, a comedy staged at the Rialto Theatre Brighton as part of the May fringe festival. The play told the story of Mansfield's 'human mole', Geoff Smith, who in 1998 was buried alive in a pub beer garden as an attempt to get into the Guinness Book of Records. Brian Butler in G Scene described the play as "an enchanting comedy, based on a true story, presented by three actors playing all the characters and an ingenious set that gives us a downward porthole view of the human mole." In Fringe Review, Lisa Wolfe wrote, "What starts out as broad comedy, in even broader Mansfield dialect...is subtly layered with universal themes of love and loss. As with the Foundry Group's earlier plays, Big Daddy vs Giant Haystacks and Those Magnificent Men, the shoddy morals and devious practices of news media has a profound impact on the real life characters being portrayed. Here it's Geoffrey, in a warm and heartfelt performance by Murray Simon, who is hounded by the press but doesn't have the skin tough enough to bear it...Duncan Henderson's Spike commands the stage; a beady-eyed chancer who narrates direct to the audience....Emma Wingrove, formidable as landlady Pearl, shows her comedy chops across six female roles."

Brian Mitchell directed, and the pub set was designed by Henderson.

Underdogs won the 2022 OffFest award for theatre at Brighton Fringe.

== Who is Number 1? ==
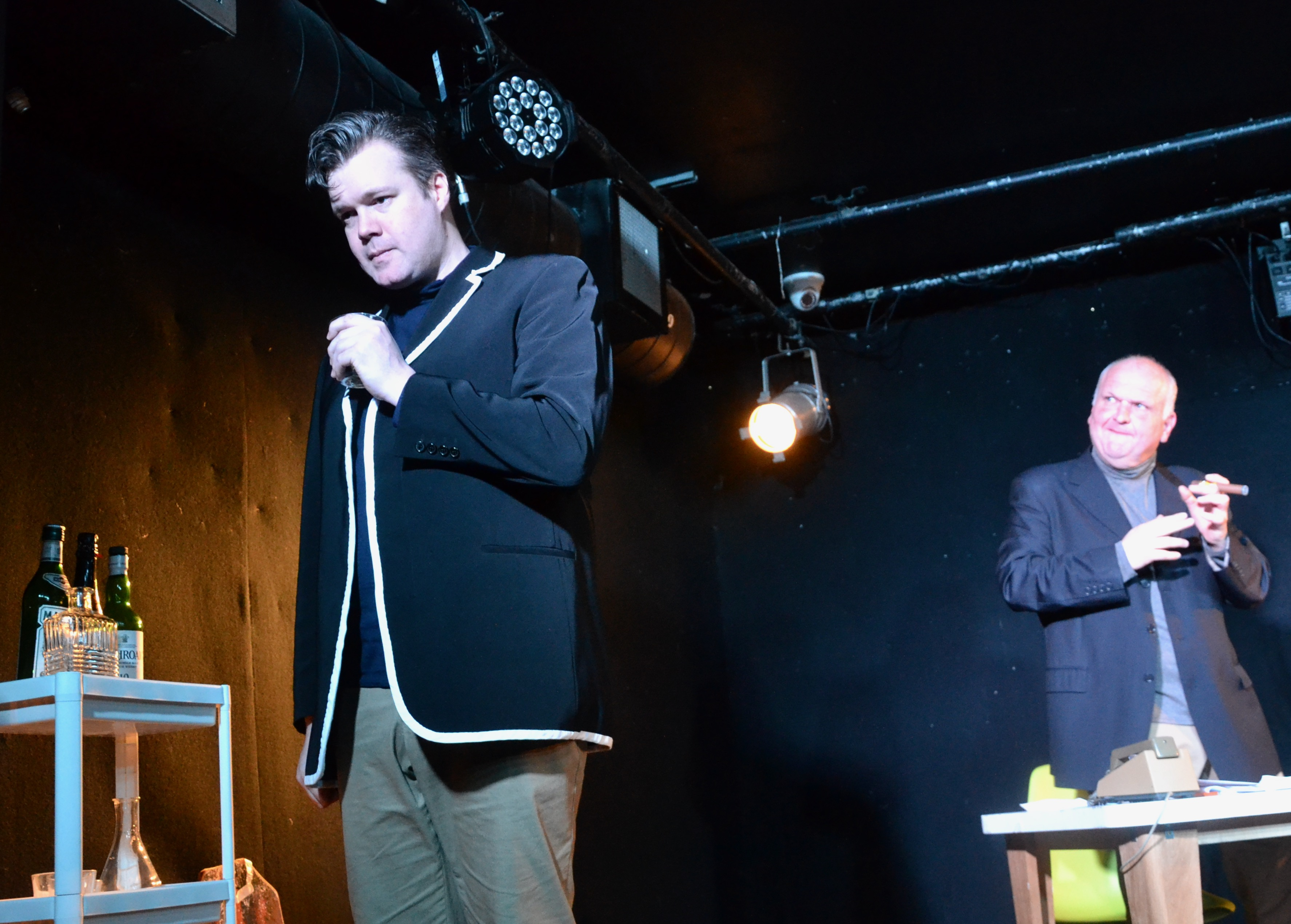
Murray Simon as Patrick McGoohan and Ross Gurney-Randall as Lew Grade in Who is Number 1, at the Latest Music Bar, Brighton, 9 May 2023. Photograph by Peter Chrisp

Mitchell and Nixon's Who is Number 1?, first performed in Brighton Fringe in 2023, is a comedy about the making of Patrick McGoohan's cult TV series, The Prisoner. The play "explores the age-old tensions between artist and patron, prophet and king, telling the truth and pleasing the crowd, and why artists sometimes risk everything for their vision". It was first performed at the Latest Music Bar, Brighton, with Murray Simon as McGoohan, Ross Gurney-Randall as Lew Grade and Nigel Stock, and Robert Cohen and Brian Mitchell in multiple roles. In Fringe Review, Simon Jenner described it as "an outstanding script, with consummate acting; the phenomenal Simon – and Gurney-Randall – at its core. This should evolve beyond the Fringe. It ought to make London. It deserves awards." The play transferred to the Courtyard Theatre, London, and was a finalist in the 2024 OffFest awards.

== Great Britons ==
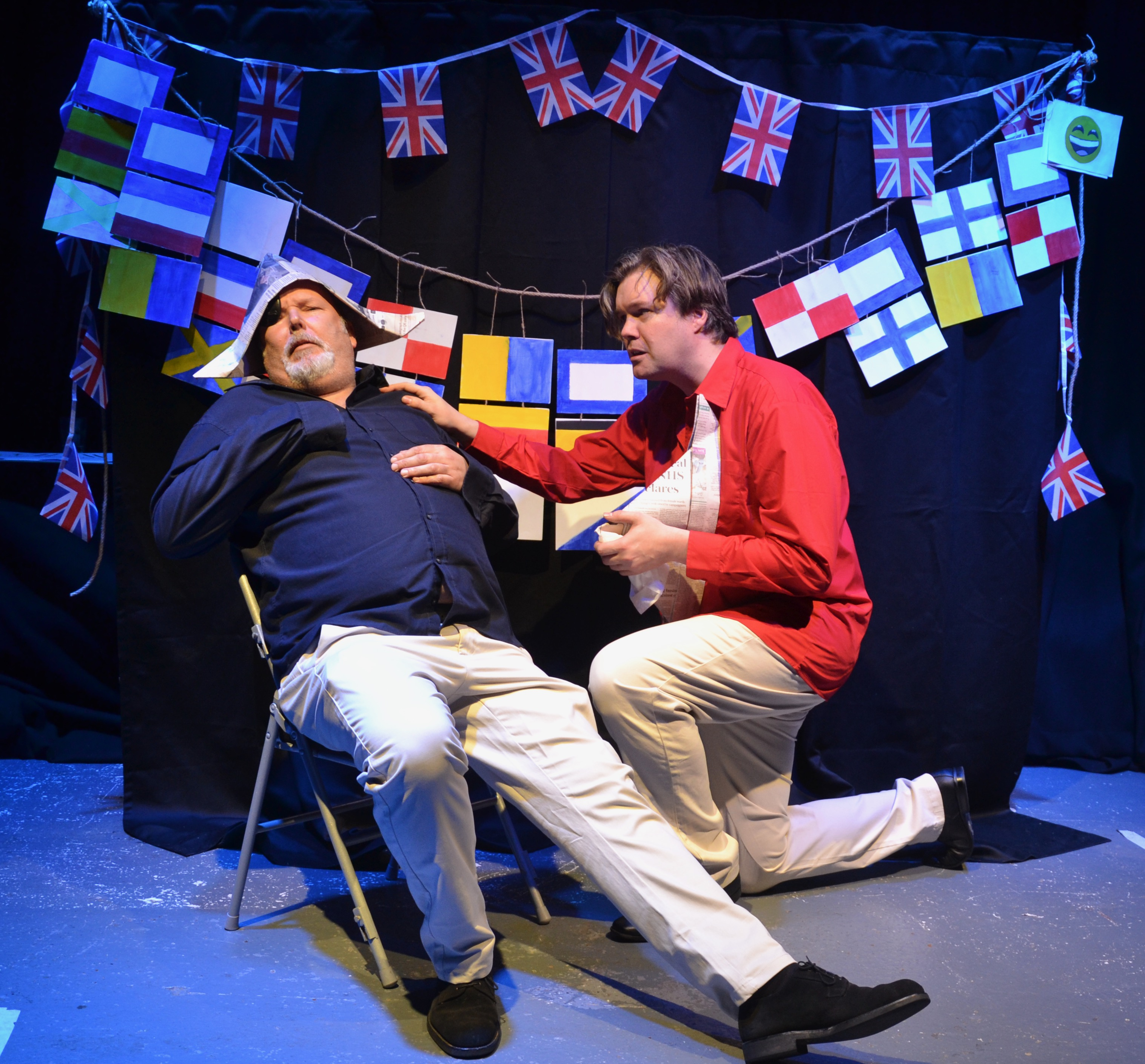
Brian Mitchell as Nelson and Murray Simon as Thomas Hardy in Great Britons, at Ironworks, Brighton, 12 May 2024. Photograph by Peter Chrisp

In 2024, Mitchell and Nixon wrote Great Britons, "a 'cut-price pageant' of the great events in the great lives of some very great Britons all done on a shoestring." The Great Britons of the title were Alfred the Great, Robert the Bruce, Francis Drake, Horatio Nelson and the Duke of Wellington, all performed by Mitchell and Murray Simon. It was first staged at Ironworks, Brighton, as part of the 2024 fringe festival. Reviewer Mike Aiken described Great Britons as "a wild and crazy romp through 10 centuries of history in, on and around these islands." For Susanne Crosby, Mitchell and Simon's double act was "an effortlessly easy partnership where the fun they are having performing is cracklingly infectious to the audience...they have succeeded in bringing classic British comedy up to date, which is an amazing feat."

== Books and Journalism ==
Mitchell and Nixon are the authors of two books in the Cheeky Guide series: The Cheeky Guide to Student Life and The Cheeky Guide to Love. Both have also contributed to David Bramwell and Tim Bick'sThe Cheeky Guide to Brighton, Nixon writing on 'Vegetarian Brighton' and Mitchell, a self-confessed 'lard lover', a 'Heartfelt Defence of the Greasy Spoon'. The guide to Brighton has gone through five editions, in which Mitchell has gradually documented the loss of the town's old fashioned caffs: 'I have felt like a latter-date Canute, trying to resist the tide of coffee chains, gastro pubs and juice bars.' In a typical review, of the Corner Cafe, Hove, Mitchell writes, 'I particularly recommend the homemade bacon pudding, which once moved my colleague David Mounfield to tears and has certainly brought me close to the condition known as Stendhal syndrome.'

Until 2015, Mitchell and Nixon wrote a regular column, Bare Cheek, in Brighton's Latest 7 listings magazine. Regular features include a surreal list of 'Fantabulous Facts About Hove' ('Hove library contains the only known copy of the Necronomicon in existence'; 'Due to some legislative anomaly, all court sessions in Hove are conducted in Jamaican patois'); Etiquette with Hetty Kwet; Edward de Bonehead's Lateral Thinking Puzzles; and 'Ask Uncle Nick', an agony column hosted by local resident, Nick Cave ('Strewth!').
