= Atlantis in popular culture =

Depictions of Atlantis in creative works

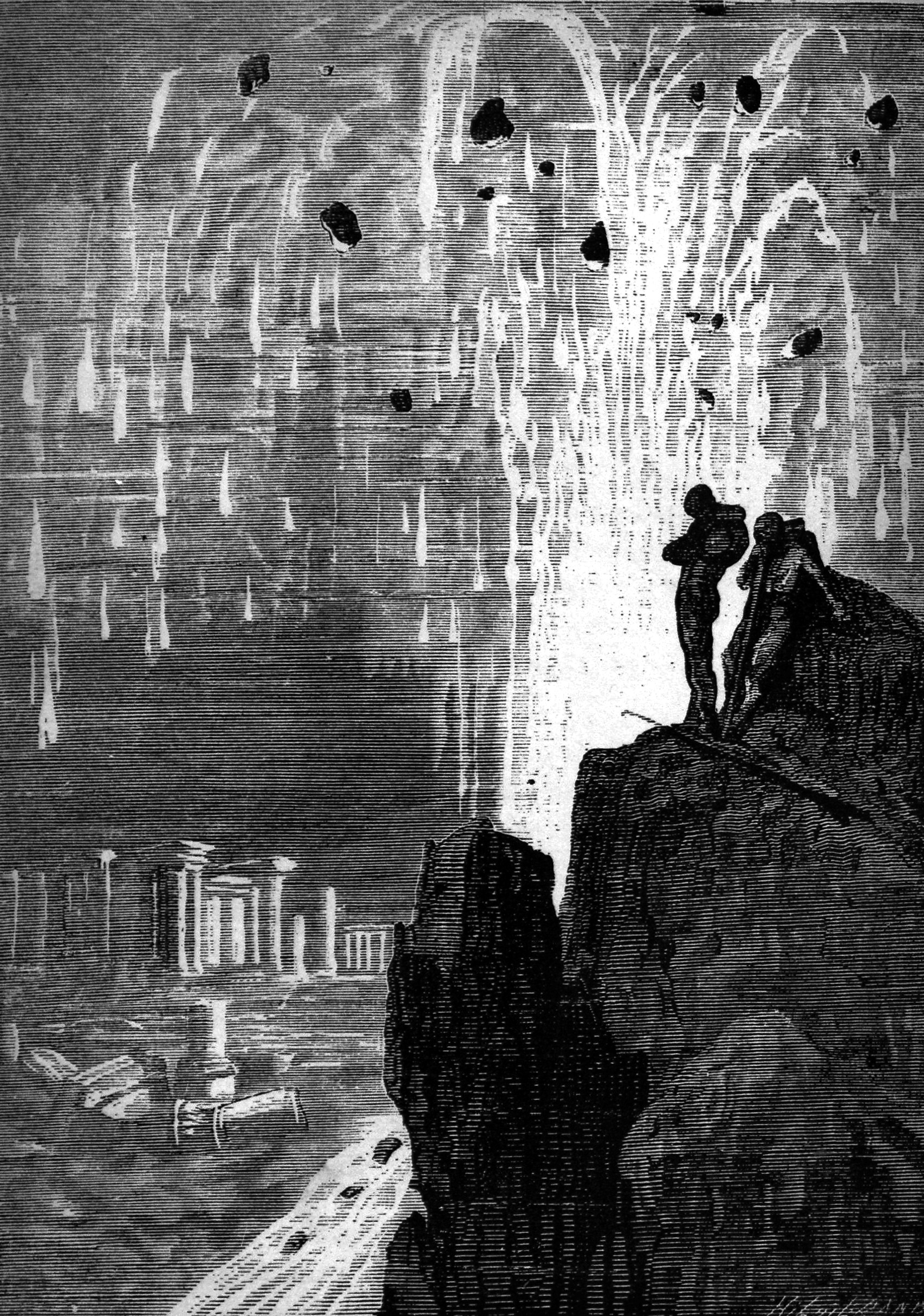
Professor Aronnax and Captain Nemo visit the remains of Atlantis in Twenty Thousand Leagues Under the Seas

The legendary island of Atlantis has often been depicted in literature, television shows, films and works of popular culture.

== Fiction ==
=== Start of genre fiction ===
Before 1900, there was an overlap between verse epics dealing with the fall of Atlantis and novels with a pretension to fine writing which are now regarded as pioneering genre fiction. Jules Verne's Twenty Thousand Leagues Under the Seas (1869/71) includes a visit to sunken Atlantis aboard Captain Nemo's submarine Nautilus – with protagonists walking for miles over the sea bottom until reaching the impressive sunken ruins, an obvious impossibility (Verne was not aware of water pressure in the ocean deeps). In Elizabeth Birkmaier's Poseidon's Paradise: the Romance of Atlantis (San Francisco 1892), the island sinks following an earthquake. C. J. Cutcliffe Hyne also depicted the end of Atlantis in his fantasy The Lost Continent: The Story of Atlantis, first published in 1899. Its main character, the soldier-priest Deucalion, is unable to prevent the tragic decline of his continent under the rule of the evil queen Phorenice. According to D. Bridgman-Metchim, the author of Atlantis, the Book of the Angels (London 1900), his account is an interpretation of the Book of Genesis covering the events immediately preceding the Flood, as recorded by one of the fallen angels.

=== After 1900 ===
(Alphabetical by author, then by title)

- In Poul Anderson's 1971 novel The Dancer from Atlantis, the Atlantis myth refers to the volcanic explosion of Thera, which is depicted as having destroyed Minoan civilization.

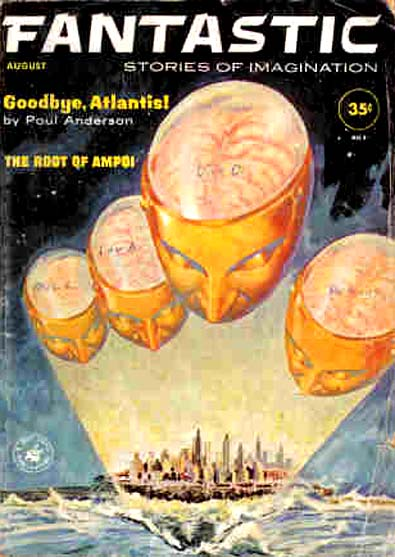
Poul Anderson's novelette "Goodbye, Atlantis!" took the cover of the August 1961 issue of Fantastic

- In Anderson's 1961 novelette "Goodbye, Atlantis!", the soon-to-be-sunken continent of Atlantis has undergone a radical social revolution, with an ideology similar to Communism. As a last-ditch effort, the diehard remnants of the old regime invoke savage old gods, which the Atlanteans have forgotten for centuries. However, the awakened vengeful deities have no interest in the Atlanteans' political and ideological struggles and destroy the continent and its inhabitants.
- In The Mutation (1999), from K. A. Applegate's series of novels Animorphs, the titular group pursue their alien enemies, the Yeerks, and discover a hostile civilization in a city at the bottom of the ocean. The civilisation, known as the Nartec, tell their own tale as to how they came to be under the sea, but although Marco jokingly suggests that the group have discovered Atlantis, the name never appears. After the Animorphs make their escape, the Nartec do not appear or are mentioned in later novels, leaving their fate unknown.
- Another series by K. A. Applegate, Everworld, depicts Atlantis as an underwater city in Everworld's oceans. The gods Poseidon and Neptune---who both seem to have their own underwater cities nearby---war over control of the city, but the politically savvy leader of the city, Jean-Claude LeMieux, manages to keep it independent.
- Alexander Beliaev, famous Russian sci-fi writer, depicted the last days of Atlantis in his 1926 novel "The Last Man From Atlantis", the highlight of the book being the love story of princess Sel and sculptor Adishirna.
- Pierre Benoit's classic L'Atlantide (1919) was a variation on a theme introduced by Henry Rider Haggard in She, and told the story of two French Officers who find the lost city of Atlantis in the midst of the Sahara, and fall in love with its beautiful queen, Antinea. It was filmed several times.
- Marion Zimmer Bradley's The Fall of Atlantis (1987) ties in to her Avalon Series, which tells the story of how the ancient druids were descendants of the survivors of Atlantis who landed in Britain.
- Bertolt Brecht's 1935 poem "Questions From a Worker Who Reads", written to emphasize the role played by the lower classes in history, includes the lines: "Even in fabled Atlantis, the night that the ocean engulfed it / The drowning still cried out for their slaves" ().
- In John Brunner's The Atlantic Abomination (1960), Atlantis was dominated by giant alien beings who had the mental power to control humans and make them into completely obedient slaves. The sinking of the continent broke their power and set the surviving humans free to eventually create the present civilization. However, American researchers in the depths of the Atlantic inadvertently awaken one of these beings from a long hibernation on the sea floor, with disastrous results.
- Fredric Brown's 1949 short story "Letter to a Phoenix" mentions Atlantis as the most recent civilization of six that the immortal narrator has lived in.
- Edgar Rice Burroughs' Tarzan series features a lost city known as Opar, said to be a colony of Atlantis. The city first appears in The Return of Tarzan (1913).
- The 1975 novel Romance of Atlantis by Taylor Caldwell.
- Atlantis is mentioned in Pastwatch: The Redemption of Christopher Columbus (1996) by Orson Scott Card; it is revealed through a machine that can look into the past that Atlantis was a 'raft city' on the banks of the Red Sea, and was completely submerged when the water from the Mediterranean and Indian Oceans came over the natural dams.
- Lincoln Child's 2007 novel Deep Storm features a supposed find of the site of sunken Atlantis. However, the reality is much more sinister.
- In Eoin Colfer's Artemis Fowl series, Atlantis is a Lower Elements city populated by Atlanteans, first appearing in Artemis Fowl: The Atlantis Complex (2010).
- In book three of Bruce Coville's Alien Adventures series, The Search for Snout (1995), Rod Albright's father is eventually revealed to be an Atlantean starfarer, from 35,000 years ago.
- The 1999 novel Atlantis Found by Clive Cussler, inspired by the non-fiction book When the Sky Fell by Rand & Rose Flem-Ath.
- Kara Dalkey's Water Trilogy (2002) is a blend of Atlantis and Arthurian legends.
- Alyssa Day's Warriors of Poseidon series is a modern-day twist combining paranormal romance novels and the myth of Atlantis.
- Arthur Conan Doyle's 1929 science fiction novel The Maracot Deep describes the discovery of the sunken remains of Atlantis by a deep-sea diving expedition, who find that it is still inhabited by a high-technology society which has adapted to life underwater.
- In The Towers of February (1973), the Dutch writer Tonke Dragt describes Atlantis as a country in the parallel world IMFEA (Inter Menses Februarium Et Aprilem).
- Diane Duane's 1985 young adult fantasy novel Deep Wizardry describes how the downfall of Atlantis was triggered by the failure of an ancient wizardry meant to preserve the balance of the earth and sea.
- Atlantis is referenced in Neverwhere (1996), by Neil Gaiman.
- Jane Gaskell's Atlan Saga features the young Atlantean princess Cija, who considers the continent's vicious Emperor Zerd to be "The most vile man alive".
- David Gemmell's fantasy novels make use of story of Atlantis in the Jon Shannow series (Wolf of Shadow, The Last Guardian and Bloodstone) and the Stones of Power series (Ghost King and Last Sword of Power).
- The 2005 novel Atlantis by David Gibbins.
- Intended to be the fifth book in its Godzilla novel series, Godzilla and the Lost Continent would have seen Godzilla encounter monsters on a landmass risen from the Pacific sea, rather than the Atlantic, which may have been Atlantis. However, the book was never published by Random House Publishing, which had produced the previous four books, for unknown reasons.
- In the novel Raising Atlantis (2005) and its sequels by Thomas Greanias, Atlantis is depicted as being buried beneath the ice of Antarctica, suggesting a large climate shift took place and covered up the ancient city.
- In Traci Harding's An Echo in Time: Atlantis (1997), Tory Alexander travels back in time to visit the lost city paradise of Atlantis and its superior civilization, where she is taught of the mind sciences and expands her psychic capabilities, and is inspired of a city plan which features in later books.
- Robert A. Heinlein's 1941 novella Lost Legacy imagined Atlantis as a colony of Mu. In a war for independence both lands sank.
- In the short stories of Robert E. Howard, the character Kull was an Atlantean – this version of Atlantis being inhabited by Barbarian tribes – and eventually became King of the civilized Valusia. His more famous character, Conan the Cimmerian, was descended from these Atlanteans.
- John Jakes' 1972 novel Mention My Name in Atlantis takes a humorous and satirical look at the Atlantis myth, being narrated by an Atlantean con-man whose account is manifestly unreliable.
- William Joyce's Guardians of Childhood series mentions the wizard Ombric Shalazar as being the last survivor of Atlantis.
- In Sherrilyn Kenyon's Dark-Hunter series, the leader of the Dark-Hunters is an Atlantean god.
- Henry Kuttner's Atlantis stories feature the sword-and-sorcery adventures of the hero Elak.
- Henry Kuttner's Hogben series feature a family of mutants originating in Atlantis, which was destroyed in a nuclear catastrophe.
- Mercedes Lackey's Dragon Jousters series is loosely based on the myth of Atlantis, as well as on the predynastic period of Ancient Egypt.
- In the Pendragon Cycle of Stephen R. Lawhead, the survivors of Atlantis settle in Britain.
- In C. S. Lewis's The Magician's Nephew (1955), Digory Kirke's uncle Andrew received a box with Atlantean symbols from his dying godmother that contained dust from another world, which he used to make the magic rings that sent Digory and his friend Polly Plummer to the worlds of Charn and Narnia.
- In C.S. Lewis's That Hideous Strength (1945), it is debated by two of the villains that the character of Merlin may be from Numinor or, as it is more commonly known, Atlantis. Other characters in the book believe that Merlin was not himself from Atlantis/Numenor, but was rather the last in a long-lasting magical tradition which was started by refugees from the sunken continent, who brought magical knowledge to prehistoric Britain.
- H. P. Lovecraft's "The Temple" (1920) tells the story of a German naval submarine sinking to the bottom of the ocean after a World War I battle and ultimately settling on the lost city of Atlantis.

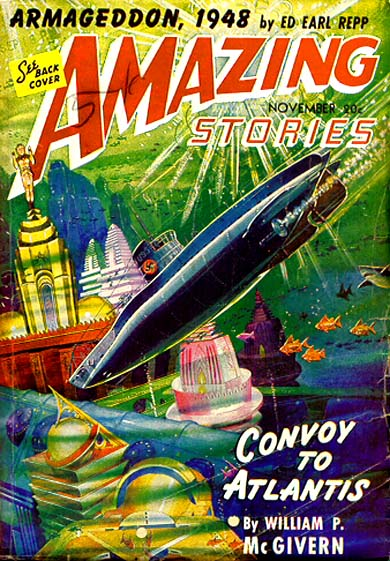
Atlantis depicted on the cover of Amazing Stories, 1941

- The 2007 novel The Hunt For Atlantis by Andy McDermott revolves around the main character's searching for the last location of the survivors of Atlantis using a recovered piece of Orichalcum.
- Walter Moers' 1999 novel The 13½ Lives of Captain Bluebear bases several chapters in Atlantis, a megacity and capital of Zamonia. It is described as having every civilization in time occupying it, since sailors came there from every period and stayed. The tale includes some real creatures, as well as a myriad of fantasy ones which make up the citizenry.
- Talbot Mundy's King of the World (1930–31) featured Jimgrim, the dashing adventurer appearing in several of Mundy's books, battling the antagonist Dorje, who has discovered the scientific secrets of Atlantis and seeks to use them to conquer the world.
- Edith Nesbit's The Story of the Amulet (1906) contains a chapter describing the fall of Atlantis.
- Stories in Larry Niven's The Magic Goes Away series often mention Atlantis or feature Atlantean characters. The Burning City (2000), a novel by Niven and Jerry Pournelle set in the same fictional universe, features an Atlantean wizard. Within the novel the wizard briefly tells the story of how waste and misuse of mana, the scarce "magic energy" resource, had caused the sinking of Atlantis.
- David Maclean Parry's The Scarlet Empire (1906) is a political satire set in Atlantis.
- Stel Pavlou places Atlantis two miles under the ice in Antarctica in the adventure novel Decipher (2001). He also suggests orichalcum was pure C_{60}.
- Diana L. Paxson wrote Ancestors of Avalon (2004), a book linking Bradley's Fall of Atlantis with the rest of Avalon Series.
- Charles Portis's comic novel Masters of Atlantis concerns the establishment, and problems thereafter, of a cult dedicated to exploring the secrets and wisdom of Atlantis, gleaned from a short text supposedly recovered from Atlantis.
- In Ayn Rand's 1957 novel Atlas Shrugged, Dagny Taggart searches for a technologically advanced city which other characters refer to as Atlantis. One of the stories told of the novel's major character John Galt was that he had devoted his life to sailing the oceans and searching for Atlantis and finally saw its lights on the sea bottom – though this is a metaphor rather than a literal depiction of the character's life.
- In Mothstorm (2008), the final book of Philip Reeve's Larklight trilogy, it is claimed that Atlantis was a lost continent on which the Mercurians had a colony before they left the Solar System thousands of years ago.
- In Matthew Reilly's 2018 novel The Secret Cities, Atlantis (Atlas) is one of the secret cities.
- In A. G. Riddle's Origin series, the Atlantians are a species of human on a separate planet. The 'city' of Atlantis is actually a crashed spaceship, with a larger ship on the moon. The human race has had its genetic evolution accelerated by these crashed Atlantians in their pursuit of science and military domination.
- In his Sigma Force novel The Bone Labyrinth (2015), James Rollins depicts an elaborately decorated and protected, hidden city of Atlantis, located in Ecuador, which the maps and writings by Kircher and his followers lead the characters to. A skirmish there, between the protagonists and antagonists, leads to the destruction of the city and its artifacts. Rollins describes Atlantis' creators as Watchers, a superior hybrid species of humans who disseminated knowledge and possibly interbred with people throughout the world.
- In Samuel Sagan's four-volume Atlantean Secrets epic, the events take place in the ancient land of Atlantis.
- In M. Sasinowski's Blood of Ra series, the Rathadi and Pureans are two ancient races that inhabited Atlantis.
- Michael Scott's series The Secrets of the Immortal Nicholas Flamel centers much of the storyline around Atlantis, referred to as 'Danu Talis", which the magical 'elders' and their Shadow Realms originate from.
- Darren Shan's Dark Calling (2009) features a destroyed planet that is said to be Atlantis. The myths about the place seemingly originated from visits that the Atlanteans made to Earth.
- In Robert Shea and Robert Anton Wilson's The Illuminatus! Trilogy (1975) Hagbard Celine and crew travel to sites in submerged Atlantis. A portion of Atlantean history is also included in the book, and it is suggested that the island of Fernando Pó, part of Equatorial Guinea, is the last surviving remnant of the continent. Shea and Wilson's story suggests that the Illuminati has its origins in Atlantis.
- Robert Sheckley's short story "King's Wishes" (1953) features a genie who travels through time from the past in order to get advanced technology from the 20th century. When the people he attempts to buy it from express concern it might cause a temporal paradox, the genie states he is from Atlantis, which will be destroyed along with the technology within a few years.
- Heart of The Dragon, Jewel of Atlantis, The Nymph King, and The Vampire's Bride are a series of books by paranormal romance author Gena Showalter. They depict the magical hidden underwater land of Atlantis, where the Greek gods banished the horrible races of beings that were the product of the Titans.
- E. E. "Doc" Smith mentions Atlantis in Triplanetary (1934) as an advanced society ultimately destroyed by nuclear weapons which extinguished civilisation before it could get too powerful.
- In Neal Stephenson's 1995 far-future novel The Diamond Age Atlantis is an Anglo-Saxon Great Phyle, mainly based on artificial islands but with enclaves elsewhere.
- B.D.Stockman's 2025 novel Atlantis: Children of the Gods places Atlantis at the Azores and depicts the mythical beginnings of Plato's lost continent with a supernatural romance between Cleito, a native of Atlantis, and 'Aatlae', later known as the god Poseidon.
- Jonathan Stroud's novel The Amulet of Samarkand mentions Atlantis as a former Greek colony on the island of Santorini in the Mediterranean
- Christia Sylf's Markosamo le Sage (1973) takes place during the Atlantean age.
- J. R. R. Tolkien's The Silmarillion contains the Akallabêth, the tale of the drowning of the proud island realm of Númenor. In his constructed language of Quenya, its name was Atalantë, lit. 'the Downfallen'; he wrote of Númenor as Atlantis in several of his letters. Scholars have noted multiple parallels between the two islands.
- In Aleksey Nikolayevich Tolstoy's novel Aelita (1923), Soviet engineer Mstislav Los' and retired soldier Alexei Gusev arrive on Mars and find a civilization of Atlantis survivors.
- The novella in the December 2005 issue of Analog Science Fiction and Fact titled "Audubon in Atlantis" by Harry Turtledove. In the story, which is an alternate history tale, Atlantis is not mythical, but is the result of the eastern portion of the North American continent, consisting of the present day Eastern Coast of the United States, extreme Southern Canada, Cuba and various Caribbean islands, breaking off from the rest of North America around 85 million years ago. This was followed by several more Turtledove stories and novels detailing various times and incidents in the history of this Atlantis.
- Dennis Wheatley's novel They Found Atlantis (1936) describes a scientific expedition which ends up stranded on the ocean floor before being saved by Atlantean descendants, who live in an utopian society.

== Manga and anime ==
- Dartz, the main antagonist of the Yu-Gi-Oh! story arc "Waking the Dragons", is from an Atlantis that was destroyed when its inhabitants became their "True" evil selves after being exposed to a miracle substance known as "orichalcos". In addition, Yugi, Joey, and Kaiba all possess legendary dragons by the names of Timaeus, Hermos, and Critias, respectively, after Dartz stole the Pharaoh's Egyptian God Card Monsters; this is in reference to the dialogues of Plato by the same name that account the events of the cataclysm.
- The 1989–1990 Gainax series Nadia: The Secret of Blue Water is based on Jules Verne's 1870 science fiction novel Twenty Thousand Leagues Under the Seas, as well as Atlantis. It has been speculated that multiple ideas from the Disney film Atlantis: The Lost Empire came from the series, leading Nadia fans to accuse the film of plagiarism. The main character, Nadia, is a descendant of the Atlanteans and the lost princess of Atlantis, while the series' main villains, the Neo-Atlantean empire, pretend to recover the lost Blue Water stones of Atlantis and use them to rule the world.
- In episode 16 of Night Head Genesis, the continents of Atlantis, Lemuria, and Mu are mentioned, as highly advanced civilizations capable of space and time travel that fell due to the impact the Minus Energy had on the Earth.
- イリヤッド ～入矢堂見聞録～ A manga series created by Uoto Osamu and Toshusa Garaku and published by Shogakukan Inc., about a former archaeologist from Japan and his search for the legendary city of Atlantis. The story combines modern and ancient theories of the location of Atlantis and the civilizations that are said to be influenced by it.
- In the anime/manga series Ōgon Bat, the main character is a hero from Atlantis who is accidentally resurrected.
- In the anime/manga series Doraemon, A Long Story is based on Atlantis, which was later adapted into a Doraemon feature film. In the story, Doraemon, Nobita, and their friends go underwater camping. After they are kidnapped by the Soldiers of Mu Federation, they befriend Eru, one of its members. Atlantis was the Sunk City, which was controlled by a malfunctioned but powerful computer named Poseidon.
- In Saint Seiya, the sunken Island of Atlantis is the sanctuary and base for the god Poseidon.
- In the anime Super Atragon and Super Atragon part II, Earth finds itself at war with a civilization far more advanced than their own, which is potentially either Atlantis, Mu, or Lemuria.
- In The Mysterious Cities of Gold, Atlantis goes to war with the Empire of Mu over a trivial misunderstanding, and both become sunken continents after using powerful superweapons to destroy one another.
- The manga (and the subsequent anime television series) The Vision of Escaflowne takes place in Gaea, a mystical world mirrored to Earth where Atlanteans were a race of winged people who fell in a catastrophic event. The technology of flying ships on Gaea is borrowed heavily from Edgar Cayce, who had psychic visions of flying ships powered by magical crystals. One of the main characters, Van, is said to have descended from the people of Atlantis. The people of Atlantis, also referred to as the Draconians or Dragon People (ryū-jin), were responsible for creating the world of Gaea using the power of wishes as Atlantis was sinking, and the story revolves largely around Emperor Dornkirk's attempts to regain that power.
- Transformers: Cybertron, an animated series based on the popular toyline, featured the lost continent of Atlantis as an ancient Cybertronian starship which, instead of floating in the water, floated in the atmosphere close to the ground. The location of Atlantis and an ancient Cybertronian artifact, the Omega Lock, was a major focus of the series' initial thirteen-episode arc. In Transformers: Armada, humans were shown to have colonized it at some point in the past.
- In One Piece, an island called Fishman Island is located at the bottom of the sea, inhabited by mermaids and fishmen, and a possible nod to Atlantis.
- In Seiichi Takayama's light novel series The Master of Ragnarok & Blesser of Einherjar's ninth volume's epilogue, Takao Saya reveals a prediction of what exactly the world of Yggdrasil is to Yuuto Suoh, who had returned to that world with Mitsuki Shimoya, predicting Yggdrasil to have a high chance of being Atlantis prior to its inevitable destruction. This was a conclusion she had drawn from putting all the clues, stories, and theories that Yuuto had brought back from Yggdrasil to modern Earth together, as Yuuto had already proved that Yggdrasil is a location on Earth at somewhere between 50 and 52 degrees latitude in the Northern Hemisphere sometime between 2000 and 1300 BC, the Late Bronze Age.
- In the 2010 anime movie, Metal Fight Beyblade vs the Sun: Sol Blaze, the Scorching Hot Invader, Atlantis was a glorious ancient civilization that ruled the world a long time ago. Its source of energy, guaranteeing prosperity, was the legendary Sol Blaze. Bakim unlocked Sol Blaze V145 AS with his Beyblade, Dark Poseidon 145 WD, and gave it to his grandson, Helios in order to create unstable weather patterns across Earth. The fused powers from both Sol Blaze and Galaxy Pegasus was used to position Asteroid Adonis crashing onto Earth, attempting to rebuild the world and resurrect Atlantis back to its former glory.

== Motion pictures ==
=== Live-action films ===
- 1921: L'Atlantide (1921 film)
- 1936: Undersea Kingdom, Unga Khan seeks to conquer Atlantis and the surface world.
- 1949: Siren of Atlantis
- 1959: Journey to the Center of the Earth features the explorers who are trying to reach the core of the earth coming upon the remains of Atlantis far below the earth's surface.
- 1961: Atlantis, the Lost Continent, a science fiction film in which Atlantis is ruled by King Cronus (Kronos), who is manipulated by the wicked sorcerer. The storyline concerns the events leading up to the total destruction of the fictional continent of Atlantis during the time of Ancient Greece.
- 1961: Hercules and the Conquest of Atlantis, starring Reg Park and Fay Spain.
- 1978: Warlords of Atlantis posits that there is not just one, but seven cities of Atlantis.
- 1979: Island of Mutations starring Barbara Bach featured the lost city of Atlantis hidden beneath the sea.
- 1985: Cocoon, a small group of aliens returns to Earth to find twenty of their species who were left behind when Atlantis was abandoned 10,000 years before.
- 1988: Alien from L.A., in which Wanda Saknussemm finds herself in an underground world that was once Atlantis.
- 1994: In MacGyver: Lost Treasure of Atlantis, MacGyver is searching for the lost continent.
- 1995: Atlantis is responsible for the creation of both Gamera and Gyaos in the 1995 film Gamera: Guardian of the Universe, and may have ties to the kaiju Irys, who is believed to be a mutated form of Gyaos.
- 2008: 10,000 BC, in which the ancient Egyptian-esque race that commands the construction of pyramids are believed by the slaves to have originated from a civilization that sank into the sea. Their king, called The Almighty, is believed to be a god. According to The Almighty's escaped servant, presumably an Atlantean himself, there are once three kings and his former master is the only one who remains. The other two are presumably deceased, thus explaining the pyramids' construction. Another scene in the film briefly shows a map depicting a large island in the middle of the Atlantic Ocean and near the ending, the priests attempt to escape from the rebels by a large ship, presumably the one they once used to escape the sinking of Atlantis.
- 2012: Journey 2: The Mysterious Island, where characters travel to a mysterious island, and Ice Age: Continental Drift, where Scrat arrives at Scratlantis, the scrat version of Atlantis
- 2018: The story of Aquaman, based on the DC Comics superhero of the same name, revolved around his quest to become the king in an attempt to thwart his half-brother King Orm's plan to unify the seven Atlantean nations against the surface world. In the film, Atlantis is depicted as an ancient lost civilization with technologically advanced society that had existed for more than 50,000 years, which fell as a consequence of Atlantean King Atlan's attempt to weaponize the powerful Poseidon's Trident. As Atlantis sunk beneath the waves, the technology that caused its destruction eventually helped them adapt to their new underwater home. However, the kingdom was later fragmented into seven underwater nations, and its survivors have adapted to different environments, consisting of the original Atlantis, Xebel, Fishermen Kingdom, The Brine, The Deserters, The Trench, and The Missing Kingdom.

=== Animated films ===
- 1983: Doraemon: Nobita and the Castle of the Undersea Devil, the Japanese animation film and fourth installment of the Doraemon film series. It is based on Lost city of Atlantis and Mu Federation.
- 2001: Atlantis: The Lost Empire is a Disney animated film which featured some of the ideas of Edgar Cayce, in which ships and aircraft were powered by a form of energy crystal from the Heart of Atlantis, which powers Atlantis. This version of Atlantis looks different than what the explorers believed it to look like, as it is more similar to an Aztec city than a Greek polis. Protagonist Milo Thatch is obsessed with finding Atlantis and is recruited for an expedition there by Preston B. Whitmore, a friend of Milo's grandfather who uncovered the Shepherd's Journal, an ancient Atlantean manuscript that contains directions to Atlantis. Milo befriends Atlantis's princess, Kida, while discovering that his teammates seek to exploit Atlantis for their own gain.
- 2003: Atlantis: Milo's Return is the sequel to Atlantis: The Lost Empire.
- 2004: The Legend of Atlantis is a Golden Films animated film. It features a brave princess named Elan who befriends Terra, an outsider, to help stop the evil adviser Beliel.
- 2018: Hotel Transylvania 3 depicts Atlantis as an ancient civilization of monsters, which sunk but was rediscovered after monsters came out of hiding.

=== Animation television ===
- In an episode of American Dragon: Jake Long, Fu recalls going to Atlantis during his time-traveling misadventures, having caused its sinking after unclogging a drain there.
- In the second season of Jackie Chan Adventures, it is revealed that one of Shendu's siblings, Bai Tza, sank Atlantis to form an undersea empire. After discovering the city in ruins, Bai Tza tries to sink San Francisco to form a new empire.
- In Centurions: Power Xtreme, Atlantis appeared as an underwater city in the two-part episodes "Atlantis Adventure" and "Hole in the Ocean".
- In the DuckTales episode "Aqua Ducks", Scrooge, Launchpad, Gyro, and Doofus go looking for Scrooge's fortune underwater and discover The Lost City of Atlantis, bringing it to the surface with an invention of a gaseous solution by Gyro. In the next episode, "Working for Scales", they hook helium balloons to it and make it fly in the sky. Huey, Dewey, and Louie discover The Lost Treasure of Atlantis inside it as well.
- In the Hercules episode "Hercules and the Big Sink", Atlantis is reigned by the wealthy king Croesus, who bribes several people. When Cassandra, pressed to show off her powers of prophecy, says that Atlantis will sink, the Fates bring out their tapestry to prove that it will not. However, Atropos accidentally slips and cuts Atlantis off of the tapestry, causing it to sink.
- In the animated TV series Justice League and related series, Atlantis is the home of Aquaman.
- In the Phineas and Ferb episode "Atlantis", the titular characters, Phineas Flynn and Ferb Fletcher, and their friends find Atlantis off the coast of Danville.
- The Prince of Atlantis is a short-lived computer animated series based on the legend of Atlantis.
- In the SpongeBob SquarePants special "Atlantis SquarePantis", SpongeBob, Patrick, Sandy, Mr. Krabs, Squidward and Plankton travel to the lost city of Atlantis to find the world's oldest soap bubble, along the way seeing Atlantic technology, treasure, arts, and weaponry.
- Teenage Mutant Ninja Turtles (1987) deals with the topic twice. In "The Lost Queen of Atlantis", the island temporarily arises from the sea outside the coast of Greece. In "Atlantis Awakes", the turtles help a merman find his way back to a very different version of Atlantis than the version previously featured on the show.
- In Teenage Mutant Ninja Turtles (2003), the Turtles discover an ancient underground city which is later revealed to be a colony of the long-lost Atlantis, known as Y'Lyntia. The city is revisited in various episodes throughout the series and the history of its rise and fall is gradually revealed. The Y'lyntians are also responsible for various races, such as the Avians, Mermen, and Beasts of Burden which appear sporadically throughout the series.
- In "Atlantis, Arise!", a second-season episode of The Transformers, modern-day inhabitants of long-submerged Atlantis forge an alliance with Megatron and attempt to conquer Washington, DC.
- In the Transformers: Armada episode "Ruin", the Transformers follow a hologram left by an ancient girl to her underwater city, which is depicted with vast modern technologies. It is stated that the misuse of the mini-cons led to the fall of multiple Greek colonies, and this one is most likely connected to Atlantis.
- In The Fairly OddParents episode "Something's Fishy!", Cosmo becomes known as "The Accursed One" after having the Lost City of Atlantis nine times. When Timmy Turner, as a merboy with the powers of Wet Willie, a parody of Aquaman, Cosmo, and Wanda explore underwater, they discover Atlantis, where its people are now merpeople. When Cosmo is spotted, their leader King Greg plans to sentence Cosmo to be eaten by one of the Kraken that Atlantis owns. After showing King Greg the reasons why they should be happy underwater and he is persuaded by the Wet Willie movie, Cosmo is no longer "The Accursed One". Unfortunately, a giant squid that Timmy tried to call to prove to the Atlanteans it existed appeared and demolished Atlantis, causing the Atlanteans to target Timmy as "The New Accursed One", and the group escapes with fish to "Clevelandlantis".
- In The Godzilla Power Hour episode "The Colossus of Atlantis", it was featured as a giant UFO that blasted off of Earth after Godzilla defeated the security droid guarding Atlantis.
- In The Simpsons episode "The Monkey Suit", Homer Simpson has a To Do-list upon which the item "Find, destroy Atlantis" is already checked.
- According to an episode of the TV show Time Cracks, Atlantis was originally a town in the middle of the desert.
- In the Transformers: Cybertron episode "Deep", the Autobots are led to an underwater city in hopes of finding the mythical Omega Lock. It is revealed that Atlantis is a colonial Autobot ship that predates human evolution and which crashed on Earth, creating the legend of Atlantis. The starship Atlantis was surfaced and used multiple times in the series.
- In an episode of Xiaolin Showdown, Dojo was the cause of Atlantis sinking the last time he was released from his cage.
- In the TV series Young Justice, Atlantis was a small village on a now-sunken continent in the middle of the Atlantic Ocean, populated by metahumans who were the descendants of Atlantis' founder, Vandal Savage. It grew to be a highly advanced civilization until the entire continent was sunk by Klarion the Witch Boy. The water-breathing survivors of the cataclysm evolved to become Atlanteans, inhabiting various underwater city-states.
- In the Futurama episode "The Deep South", Fry, Farnsworth, Leela, Bender, and the others discover the lost city of Atlanta, a parody of Atlantis. It also includes Donovan singing a parody of his song "Atlantis".
- In the first episode of the 2017 reboot of DuckTales, "Woo-oo!", Huey, Dewey, Louie, Webby, Scrooge, and Launchpad venture to find Atlantis, which to their surprise is upside down. However, Flintheart Glomgold was following them, with Scrooge's nephew, Donald Duck, and ends up blowing up the city with his goonies and the others inside.
- The second half of the Laff-A-Lympics episode "Louisiana and Atlantis" features two Olympic-like events located in Atlantis: the Seahorse Race, where three players can ride on their oversized seahorses to race on, and the Mermaid Rescue, where one of the three players can swim the farthest to rescue a mermaid, portrayed by Cindy Bear.
- In episode 6 of Good Morning Today, Krish Goldstein visits Atlantis in the alternate universe where the TV series takes place. While Atlantis still sank into the ocean, it mysteriously emerged from the ocean in August 1974, the same day when Richard Nixon resigned from office, following an underwater volcanic eruption. It is now a vacation wonderland upon being auctioned off to some Florida real-estate developers.
- The Rick and Morty episode "The Ricklantis Mixup" opens with Rick and Morty making plans to visit Atlantis, although the rest of the episode takes place at the Citadel of Ricks. The episode title is a reference to the fact that the stories were "mixed up."
- In the Krapopolis episode "Prince Hippo", Atlantis is shown to be beneath the ocean somewhere off the coast of the titular city, has advanced technology, and is inhabited by fish people. The character Hippocampus is an Atlantean who was the result of a union between the unnamed Queen of Atlantis and the Mantitaur Shlub, who the Queen claims to not remember. Even though Hippocampus reunites with his mother, he soon finds out that the Atlanteans needed the knowledge of the special water-filled helmet that Hippocampus uses on land so that they can invade the surface world. Their plan is thwarted when Tyrannis uses the same anti-bird whistle that breaks the Atlanteans' water helmet the same way it previously broke Hippocampus' water-filled helmet in an earlier incident.
- In the Miraculous: Tales of Ladybug & Cat Noir episode "Style Queen", it is revealed that Plagg, the Kwami of Destruction, had been responsible for the disappearance of Atlantis after he "had too much cheese".

=== Live-action television ===
- Atlantika – Atlantika is a Philippine fantasy-drama series produced by GMA Network about the fictional undersea kingdom of Atlantika. Atlantika opens with the tale of three lovers: Haring Agat (Gardo Versoza), Reyna Celebes (Jean García) and Barracud (Ariel Rivera). Their love triangle sparks a war that divides the underwater domain and pushes Barracud to the dark side. Aquano the Senturyon (Dingdong Dantes) must fulfill his duty of saving Atlantika by searching for the two lost princesses of the kingdom. One of them will be the woman destined for him (Ruana) while the other must be defeated before she destroys Atlantika itself (Amaya). With four princess-possible candidates to choose from, Cielo (Iza Calzado), Alona (Isabel Oli), Helena (Katrina Halili) and Elisa (Valerie Concepcion), Aquano asks the help of the most skillful Senturyon in Atlantika, Camaro (Rudy Fernandez), to train him for the fight of his life.
- The British science-fiction series Doctor Who presents three versions of Atlantis' fate:
  - In The Underwater Menace (1967), the second Doctor, Ben, Polly, and Jamie discover on contemporary Earth that Atlantis still exists, near the Azores, and a reclusive scientist intends to raise it above the waves again.
  - Atlantis had also been mentioned in The Dæmons (1971), with the godlike being Azal citing its destruction as a warning of an experiment gone wrong.
  - The Time Monster (1972) concerns the plans of renegade Time Lord the Master to control Kronos, an ancient and powerful being worshipped by the Ancient Greek-style Atlanteans, while the third Doctor and Jo endeavour to stop him. Atlantis is located on Santorini.
- In "Waterworld", an episode of the 1990s Flipper series, Courtney is saved by Luke, a diver looking for Atlantis, which is revealed to be off the coast of the Florida Keys. Luke reveals to Courtney that his grandparents died while searching for Atlantis and he wants to continue their legacy. Courtney's cousin Jackie suspects that Luke is an Atlantean himself because he can stay underwater for a long time without scuba gear, can communicate with dolphins, and seemingly "morphs" into them while swimming. Later, Luke and Courtney go diving and find Atlantis during a massive undersea quake. Courtney is rescued, but not before she sees Luke and Flipper swim into a cave filled with light. At the end of the episode, everybody gives up hope of finding Luke when Flipper suddenly leaps out of the water with another dolphin who has designs on his side similar to Luke's amulet. Courtney suddenly feels peace that Luke is all right.
- The GoGo Sentai Boukenger character Morio Makino is obsessed with finding Atlantis.
- In the Hercules: The Legendary Journeys episode "Atlantis", Hercules finds himself washed ashore on the fabled land and has to contend with various crystal powered devices as well as Cassandra (Claudia Black) who has visions of impending doom for the island.
- In the mock reality series I'm with Busey, Gary Busey claims that a continent called Atlantis existed "10,556 years ago." Busey claims that the Egyptian pyramids were part of a failed Atlantean experiment to connect Earth's energy with that of other planets so that "our energy would expand and be better," but in reality warped humankind's collective DNA, shortening the average lifespan.
- Man from Atlantis was a made-for-TV film and a short-lived (1977–1978) series on NBC, created by Mayo Simon and produced by Herbert F. Solow. It starred Patrick Duffy as an amnesiac called Mark Harris, presumably an apparent survivor of the lost continent of Atlantis, who could breathe underwater and endure the high pressures of the ocean depths. Duffy later wrote a novel based on the series, also titled Man From Atlantis, without known assistance from either Simon or Solow; he intended it to provide his own solutions to the mystery, and fill in the gaps in the memories, of Mark Harris.
- The seaQuest DSV episode "Lostland" deals with Commander Ford discovering a golden helmet and sword with carvings in it, which he claims came from the lost continent of Atlantis. When Captain Bridger and Ortiz try the helmet on, they are consumed by an ancient curse held within the helmet.
- In the Star Trek: The Next Generation episode "Family", Jean-Luc Picard is asked to lead a terraformation project to create a new continent on Earth, called Atlantis, in the Atlantic Ocean, close to the Canadian coastline. Unsure of his return to Starfleet in the wake of his traumatic experience with the Borg, he nearly accepts. The mythical Atlantis is also mentioned twice elsewhere, both times as a comparison when the protagonists have discovered a utopian civilization.

Aerial view of Atlantis as depicted in Stargate Atlantis.

- In the Syfy Universal series Stargate Atlantis, Atlantis is a city-ship created by the 'Ancients' – a race of human-like beings who were much more technologically and evolutionarily advanced than ordinary humans. Several million years ago, Atlantis was moved from Earth to its final resting place in the Pegasus Galaxy, only to be submerged under a great ocean to protect it from the Ancients' enemies in Pegasus. Eventually, the inhabitants were evacuated back to Earth through Atlantis' Stargate, and their stories gave rise to the legends of Atlantis, the great city, said to slumber under the ocean. Ten thousand years later, a team of human explorers led by the civilian, Dr. Elizabeth Weir, travel to Atlantis via Earth's Stargate with a team of scientists and military personnel from all over the world to discover the secrets of the Ancients. (See Stargate)
- Atlantis, 2011 BBC One production starring Stephanie Leonidas as Pinaruti, Reece Ritchie as Yishharu, Langley Kirkwood as Rusa, and Tom Conti as the Narrator.
- Atlantis is the setting of the 2013 BBC One fantasy series of the same name.

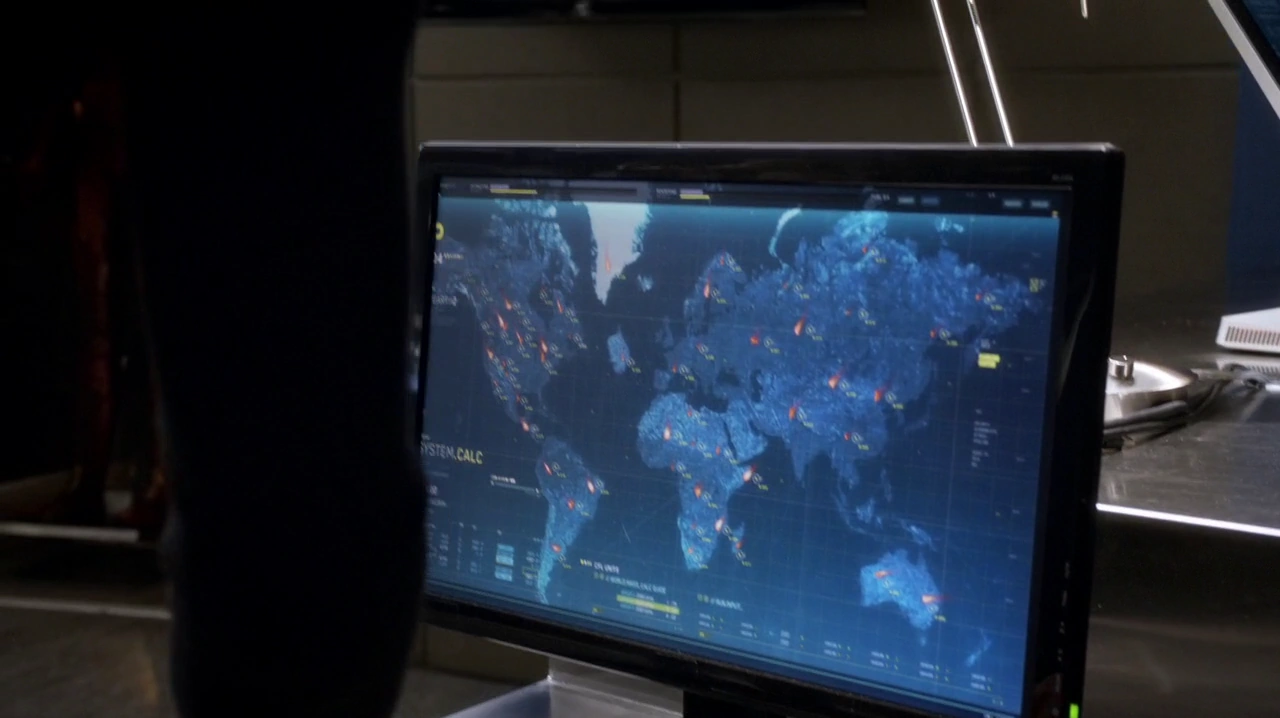
S.T.A.R. Labs screen displaying the virtual map of Earth-2 with Atlantis.

- In the second and third seasons of The Flash, Atlantis is depicted as a continent on Earth-2, which Hunter Zolomon describes as a place no one wants to leave. Located in the north of the Atlantic Ocean, west of Europe and east of the United States, Atlantis is known to produce poor-quality plastic used in 'break-up cubes'. After rescuing Jesse Quick, Barry Allen and Iris West-Allen temporarily relocate to Atlantis to stay with family members.
- Atlantis is mentioned in The Librarians episode "And the Point of Salvation". A mystical stone salvaged from the city is used to power an experimental quantum computer, resulting in the creation of both a time loop and a pocket dimension based on a video game the computer copied.
- In the Good Omens episode "Saturday Morning Funtime," Adam Young reads about things in a conspiracy magazine that Anathema also talks about, which start to come true. One of them involves the reappearance of Atlantis, which caused a cruise ship to run aground on it. The people on the cruise ship met Atlanteans, with the internet pictures of Atlantis making the news. Crowley's globe places Atlantis in between Africa and South America.

== Video games ==
- Atlantis no Nazo is a side-scrolling platform game developed and published by Sunsoft for the Family Computer in 1986.
- The 1992 game Indiana Jones and the Fate of Atlantis features the titular hero searching for the legendary city, which is located near Thera and houses technology sought after by the Nazis.
- The 1996 game Tomb Raider features Atlantis as the fourth location Lara Croft travels to in her quest to uncover the truth behind the Scion artefact that she was hired to retrieve. Atlantis also appears in the 2007 remake of Tomb Raider, titled Tomb Raider: Anniversary, and in its 2027 remake, titled Tomb Raider: Legacy of Atlantis.
- Atlantis: The Lost Tales from Cryo Interactive
- There are casual games such as "Pearls of Atlantis" from legacy games of 4 games, "Eternal Journey: New Atlantis" from Five-Bn, "Atlantis: Mysteries of Ancient Inventors, Atlantis Sky Patrol" from the big fish game, Atlantis series from playrix, Atlantis Underwater Tycoon - from Anarchy Enterprises, Jewel Legends: Atlantis from cerasus media, Escaping Atlantis from Oberon media, Bricks of Atlantis by Arcade Lab, Hidden Wonders of the Depths 3: Atlantis Adventures by ERS G-Studio, Samantha Swift and the Mystery from Atlantis By mumboJumbo, Jewel of Atlantis, Moorhuhn Jump’n run: Atlantis by alawar, Age of Atlantis by afterlab game studio, Diver: Deep Water Adventures by BiArt Company
- Atlantis plays an important role in Age of Mythology, where is displayed as a Greek civilization. Atlatis becomes its own culture in the expansion pack Age of Mythology: The Titans.
- The 2008 game Civilization Revolution features Atlantis as an ancient artifact. Players who find it will receive three free tech.
- In the 2010 video game God of War: Ghost of Sparta, Kratos travels to Atlantis to find his mother on a quest to unveil the past of his twin brother, Deimos. The city is home to the Temple of Poseidon, and near the city is a real-world location called Methana Volcano. The outskirts holds a temple to the god Thanatos, mainly the in-game location called Death's Gate that leads to Domain of Death.
- The 2018 video game Assassin's Creed Odyssey depicts Atlantis as being underneath the island of Thera, Greece. It is explorable in the 2019 expansion, The Fate of Atlantis.
- The 2020 VR game Walkabout Mini Golf by Mighty Coconut includes Atlantis as a DLC course.
- The 2024 video game Abathor tells the story of four heroes saving Atlantis from a demonic invasion.

== Music ==
=== Artists ===
- The Austrian band Visions of Atlantis.
- The English band Lower Than Atlantis.

=== Albums ===
(Alphabetical by album title)

- The 1982 song "Atlantída" by Slovak singer Miroslav Žbirka
- The 2004 album Atlantis by German Death metal band Atrocity
- The 1967 album Atlantis by Sun Ra.
- The 2004 album Atlantis: A Symphonic Journey by David Arkenstone
- The 2001 album Atlantis Ascendant by British symphonic black metal band Bal-Sagoth.
- The 2006 album Atlantis: Hymns for Disco by K-os
- The 2003 song and album Atlantis Princess by BoA.
- The 2001 album Atylantos, written and produced by Jean-Patrick Capdevielle and featuring Chiara Zeffirelli, Elena Cojocaru, Jade Laura d'Angelis, and Nikola Todorovich.
- The 1999 album Crowning of Atlantis by Therion.
- The 1977 album Ocean by Eloy.
- The 1984 album The Sentinel by the UK progressive rock band Pallas contains a series of connected songs that together make up the Atlantis Suite, a reworking of the Atlantis myth.
- The 2000 album V: The New Mythology Suite by progressive metal band Symphony X tells the story of Atlantis.

=== Songs ===
(Alphabetical by song title, then by artist)

- The 2010 song "Atlantis" from Birds and Cages by Christian influenced indie rock band Deas Vail describes the city as a utopia of trapped citizens perpetually waiting for rescue.
- The 1994 songs "Abyss" and "Atlantis" from the Dreamspace by Power metal band Stratovarius.
- The folk/pop singer Donovan scored a top 10 (Billboard Hot 100) pop hit in 1969 with "Atlantis", a song which begins with a narrative of Plato's account of Atlantis.
- The 1973 song "Atlantis" by Earth and Fire, from the album with the same name.
- The 2012 song "Atlantis" by Ellie Goulding from the album Halcyon.
- The 1993 song by Drum & Bass artist LTJ Bukem is titled "Atlantis".
- The 2021 song "Atlantis" by Noah Gundersen featuring Phoebe Bridgers.
- The 1972 song Ατλαντίς (Μαγική Πολιτεία) (Atlantis (Magical Realm)) by Greek pop-rock band Nostradamos which appeared in their album Νοστράδαμος (Nostradamos).
- The 2016 song "Atlantis" by Seafret.
- The 1963 instrumental Atlantis by The Shadows.
- The 2008 album Swim by The Whispertown 2000 includes a song titled "Atlantis".
- The 1997 songs "Atlantis I", "Atlantis II" and "Atlantis III" from the Orama album by Greek doom-death band On Thorns I Lay.
- The 1980 song "Atlantís Calling" by Flash and the Pan
- The 1997 song "Atlantis Falling" featured in the album Iron Savior by Iron Savior. In addition, a number of their songs and albums revolve around their version of the story of Atlantis.
- The 1986 song "Atlantis is calling" by Modern Talking
- The song "Atlantis to Interzone" by Klaxons, from the album Myths of the Near Future.
- The 2010 album Survival Story by the Flobots includes a song titled "Defend Atlantis", which contrasts the sinking of Atlantis in the past and climate change in the present day.
- The 2011 song "Fall of Atlantis" by US heavy metal band White Wizzard from their album Flying Tigers (White Wizzard album)
- The 1988 song "Floating City" by Y Kant Tori Read from their self titled album alludes to Atlantis.
- The 2004 song "Forsaken" from The Silent Force album by symphonic metal band Within Temptation has been described to tell the story of Atlantis.
- The 1994 song "Lament for Atlantis" from the album "The Songs of Distant Earth" by Mike Oldfield. The album is based on the book of the same name, by Arthur C. Clarke.
- The 1990 song Looking for Atlantis by the english band Prefab Sprout on the album Jordan: The Comeback
- The 2007 song "Seattlantis" by The Fall of Troy, refers to the actual city of Seattle sinking into the sea
- The 1977 song "Voyage to Atlantis" by The Isley Brothers
- The 2012 song "Dark Fate of Atlantis" from Ascending to Infinity album by Symphonic Metal band Luca Turilli's Rhapsody.
- The 2016 song "Atlantis" by Bridgit Mendler.
- The 2021 song "Atlantis" from the repackage album of the album "Don't Call Me" by SHINee.
- The song "1983… (A Merman I Should Turn to Be)" by Jimi Hendrix, mentions Atlantis as the destination for the narrator and his love "Catharina" after escaping permanent wars onland.

=== Opera ===
The opera Der Kaiser von Atlantis (The Emperor of Atlantis) was written in 1943 by Viktor Ullmann with a libretto by Peter Kien, inmates at the Nazi concentration camp of Theresienstadt. The Nazis did not allow it to be performed, assuming the opera's reference to an Emperor of Atlantis to be in fact a satire on Hitler. Both the composer and the librettist were murdered in Auschwitz, but the manuscript survived and was performed for the first time in 1975 at Amsterdam.

== Bibliography ==
- Taves, Brian, ed. (2006). Talbot Mundy, Winds From the East. Ariel Press.
- Berresford Ellis, Peter (1984). The Last Adventurer: The Life of Talbot Mundy. Donald M Grant.
