= Birkmaier =

Birkmaier is a surname. Notable people with the surname include:

- Anton Birkmaier (1869–1926), German scientific illustrator
- Elizabeth Birkmaier (1845–1912), American writer
- Emma Marie Birkmaier (1908–1985), American educator
