= Duits =

Duits is a Dutch-language surname meaning "German". People with the name include:

- Charles Duits (1925–1991), French writer of the fantastique
- Sander Duits (1983), Dutch former professional footballer
- Thimo te Duits (1962), Dutch art historian, curator, author and editor
