= Charles Duits =

French writer (1925–1991)

Charles Duits (1925–1991) was a French writer of the fantastique.

== Life ==
Born in Neuilly, Duits was the son of a Dutch father and a French mother. He emigrated to the United States in 1940.

== Works ==
Duits was a friend of André Breton and the surrealists. He wrote poetry and experimented with peyote. One Thousand and One Nights and the Indian Ramayana both influenced his work. He wrote for the Da Costa Encyclopédique from 1946; it was launched by Robert Lebel with Isabelle and Patrick Waldberg, and its anonymous contributors included leading surrealists, Georges Bataille and Jean Ferry.

As a novelist, Duits, bears comparison with Gustave Flaubert and with fellow French fantasist Christia Sylf. Ptah Hotep (1971) and Nefer (1978) together comprise a heroic fantasy take place in an Earth with two moons, one called Athenade and the other Thana. The novels take place during the time of Ancient Egypt and the Roman Empire. Ptah Hotep is the story of the ascension of a young prince to the rank of the second man of the empire, the duke of Ham. Nefer, which takes place several centuries later, tells of the adventures of a young Egyptian priest who falls in love with a sacred prostitute.

The supernatural, as featured discretely in the novels, reflects Duits spiritual "otherworld". The erotic passages contained within are integrally linked to his mysticism.

== Bibliography ==
- Le Pays de l’Éclairement (The Land of Illumination) (1967). English translation : "Peyote Dreams (Journeys in the Land of Illumination)" InnerTradition, 2013
- Ptah Hotep (1971)
- Les Miférables (The Miferables) (1971)
- La Conscience Démonique (Demonic Consciousness) (1974)
- Nefer (1978)
- Fruit sortant de l’Abîme (Fruit From The Abyss) (1993)
