= The Celestial Triad =

Book trilogy by Traci Harding

- Chronicle of Ages; Tablet of Destinies; The Cosmic Logos
- Author: Traci Harding
- Cover artist: David Harding
- Language: English
- Genre: Fantasy
- Publisher: Harper Voyager
- Media type: Print (paperback)
- Preceded by: The Ancient Future Trilogy

The Celestial Triad is a set of fantasy novels by Traci Harding. The story follows a 20th-century Australian woman who is transported to 5th century Wales in an attempt to change the future. Major themes within the series include time travel, martial arts, magic and psychic phenomenon. It is the second trilogy to feature the characters concerned, the first being The Ancient Future Trilogy.

== Plot ==
=== Book 1 – Chronicle of Ages ===
Traci Harding returns to The Ancient Future Trilogy which ended with the 'Chosen' leaving Earth for the further reaches of space. Earth must follow its own path for a time while the gods battle elsewhere. Noah, storyteller and chronicler, tutors the children born after colonization and must explore the past to fill in the gaps in his written histories. Tory, Maelgwn and Rhun recall their life and times in ancient Britain when Maelgwn reigned as High King of the Britons and Tory was a student of time travel and immortality under Taliesin. Rhun became King of Gwynedd after Maelgwn. When Vortipor, High King of the Britons, dies, there is a bloody 4-day skirmish over who should succeed him. Sir Bryce is killed in the action and Rhun is forced to abdicate. Noah finds himself on a celestial journey through the ethers, space and time as the missing years in his Chronicle of Ages unfold.

=== Book 2 – Tablet of Destinies ===
The second book in The Celestial Triad takes Tory and Maelgwn into the realms of the Devachan, the Fourth Dimension. They and their clan have had many peaceful years on the planet of Kila until Tory's new twin babies, only a few days after their birth, are switched with changelings ... the babies now exhibit all the characteristics of fairy folk and, as with all deva infants, are neither male nor female.

Tory seeks the counsel of the Tablet of Destinies and is told that the changelings are the first of the Devachan to venture into human existence, and that her twins are the first humans to choose to experience the world of the Devachan ... and all the babies are psychically linked. To reclaim their children, Tory and Maelgwyn must journey into the fourth dimension.

=== Book 3 – The Cosmic Logos ===
With the Nefilim gone, and all the human races united, it is time for Tory and Maelgwn to unite into one soul-mind and assume their rightful place among the other ascended masters of the Cosmic Logos. But first, they must address the growing problems on Gaia so that their planet of origin may join the new interstellar alliance.

On Kila, Lahmu's newly appointed council is confronted by a major threat to the peace when the Aten space station is mysteriously stolen. Now Lahmu and the young rulers of the intergalactic alliance must track down the culprits before they discover the Aten's time travel function and cast history in chaos.

Tory and Maelgwn struggle to guide their kindred, who remain on the earth plane. But will the Dragon's boys perceive the counsel of their absent parents, before intergalactic war drags humankind to the brink.

== Characters ==
- Tory Alexander - The heroine of the story, Tory is a twenty-something Australian woman who is adept at Tae Kwon Do and speaks fluent Brythonic.
- Maelgwn of Gwynedd - Former King of Gwynedd, Maelgwn is known as 'the Dragon of the Isle' or simply 'the Dragon'.
- Brian Alexander - Tory's brother. Brian is Brockwell's 21st century incarnation. Brian is one of the Chosen.
- Candace - Candace is Brian's wife. She is the Chosen incarnation of Katren, Naomi & Nin Tabitha.
- Rhun of Gwynedd - Rhun, former King of Gwynedd, is the first-born child of Tory & Maelgwn.
- Sybil - Sybil originated from Atlantis and is Rhun's wife. She is the Chosen incarnation of Bridgit.
- Rhiannon - Rhiannon is Tory & Maelgwn's first-born daughter, conceived from Maelgwn's 21st century incarnation, Miles. Rhiannon is the Chosen incarnation of Aella & Annora.
- Cadwallon - Cadwallon originated from the Dark Ages and is Rhiannon's husband. He is the Chosen incarnation of Bryce and Ray.
- Rebecca - Rebecca, also known as Pocahontus, originated from ? and is Noah's wife. She is the Chosen incarnation of Kaileah.
- Noah Purcell - Noah originated from the 21st century and is Rebecca's husband. He is the Chosen incarnation of Selwyn, Seth & Adapa.
- Boadicea - Boadicea is Floyd's wife. She is the Chosen incarnation of Ione, Kya and Nin Lilith.
- Floyd - Floyd originated from the 21st century and is Boadicea's husband. He is the Chosen incarnation of Sir Tiernan.
- Neraida - Neraida is Cadwell's wife. She is the Chosen incarnation of Cara.
- Cadwell - Cadwell originated from the Dark Ages and is Neraida's husband. He is the Chosen incarnation of Vortipor.
- Talynn - Talynn is Ethan's wife. She is the Chosen incarnation of Alma.
- Ethan - Ethan is Talynn's husband. He is the Chosen incarnation of Angus.

== Editions ==
1. — (March 29, 2000). Chronicle of Ages. The Celestial Triad. Vol. 1. Australia: Harper Voyager. ISBN 978-0-7322-6675-2.
  - — (2011). Chronicle of Ages. The Celestial Triad. Vol. 1. Australia: Harper Voyager. ISBN 978-0-7304-9973-2.
2. — (March 28, 2001). Tablet of Destinies. The Celestial Triad. Vol. 2. Australia: Harper Voyager. ISBN 978-0-7322-6683-7.
  - — (2011). Tablet of Destinies. The Celestial Triad. Vol. 2. Australia: Harper Voyager. ISBN 978-0-7304-9974-9.
3. — (February 27, 2002). The Cosmic Logos. The Celestial Triad. Vol. 3. Australia: Harper Voyager. ISBN 978-0-7322-6667-7.
  - — (2011). The Cosmic Logos. The Celestial Triad. Vol. 3. Australia: Harper Voyager. ISBN 978-0-7304-9975-6.
