= Thomas Greanias =

American author, born 1965

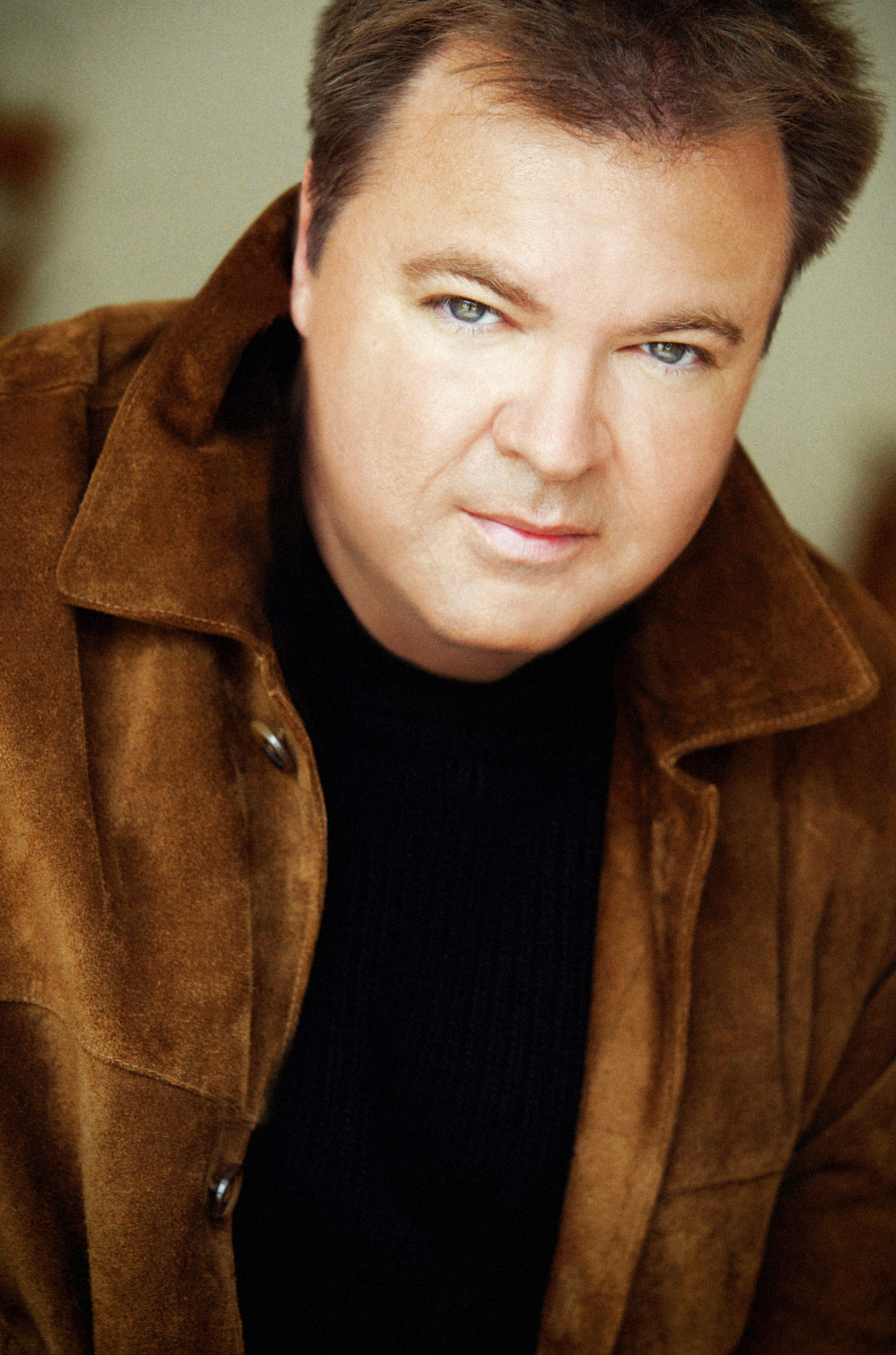
- Born: February 19, 1965 (age 61); Wilmette, Illinois, U.S.
- Occupation: Writer
- Notable work: Conrad Yeats series

Thomas Greanias (born February 19, 1965, in Wilmette, Illinois) is an American novelist known for his series of novels focusing on Conrad Yeats and Atlantis.

== Conrad Yeats series ==
The series focuses on Conrad Yeats, an archeologist tasked with discovering the origins of the human race as well as saving it from the end of the world. He is accompanied by Serena Serghetti, a brilliant linguist from the Vatican. The first novel, Raising Atlantis, was initially published through Greanias's website and was given an ebook release in 2005. Later that same year it was given a paperback release through Pocket Star.

Greanias put out two additional novels in the series, The Atlantis Prophecy (2008) and The Atlantis Revelation (2009), but has stated that it was initially intended to be made up of seven. The Atlantis Prophecy placed on The New York Times Best Seller list for mass market paperbacks for the week of May 4, 2008. Greanias continued writing about the character of Conrad Yeats with the 2007 publication of The Virgin City, set before the events of Raising Atlantis. This marked the first entry in The Virgin Mysteries series. He put out a second entry in the series, the short story The Virgin Sky, which is set chronologically between Raising Atlantis and The Atlantis Prophecy. He has also published another short story set in the series, The Virgin Sea, which follows the character of Serena Serghetti.

In 2013 he returned to the Yeats character for The Alignment series, which ties in with the ARG mobile game Ingress.

== Bibliography ==
=== Conrad Yeats ===
1. Raising Atlantis (2005)
2. The Atlantis Prophecy (2008)
3. The Atlantis Revelation (2009)

==== The Virgin Mysteries ====
- The Virgin City: The First Conrad Yeats Adventure (2007)
- The Virgin Sky: The Secret History of America's Capital (2020 - Kindle publication)
- The Virgin Sea

=== Dominus Dei ===
1. The Chiron Confession (2012)
2. Wrath of Rome (2012)
3. Rule of God (2012)

=== Sam Decker ===
1. The Promised War (2010)
2. The 34th Degree (2011)

=== The Alignment ===
1. The Alignment: Ingress (2013)
2. The Alignment: Federal City (2014)

=== Standalone novels ===
- The War Cloud (2010)
- Red Glare (2020)
