= Stel Pavlou =

British screenwriter and speculative fiction novelist

- Born: 22 November 1970 (age 55); Gillingham, Kent, England
- Occupations: Novelist, Screenwriter, Producer, Actor
- Writing career
- Genres: Thriller, speculative fiction, science fiction, adventure
- Subjects: History, mythology, anthropology, languages, genetics, outer space
- Website: www.stelpavlou.com

Stelios Grant Pavlou (born 22 November 1970) is a British screenwriter and speculative fiction novelist. He is known for writing the novel Decipher and the screenplay for the film The 51st State.

== Personal life ==
Pavlou was born in Kent, England on 22 November 1970 and went to the Chatham Grammar School for Boys. He attended the University of Liverpool in American Studies and received a degree in American Studies, which required that he spend a semester in the United States. Pavlou also served in the Cypriot army for one year.

== Career ==
After graduating from the University of Liverpool Pavlou applied to approximately six hundred media jobs without success. He wrote the script for the film The 51st State (known as Formula 51 in the United States) while he was living in Rochester, Kent, and working for a local wine shop. The film was released in 2001 and starred Samuel L. Jackson and Robert Carlyle. For the British DVD release Pavlou did the audio commentary and included a featurette titled, "Who the Hell is Stel Pavlou." In 2001 Pavlou published his debut novel, Decipher, through Simon & Schuster. The novel centers upon Atlantis and received reviews from The Independent, The Washington Post, and Cryptologia. He published a second novel, Gene, in 2005 and in 2017, released the first book in his children's fiction series Daniel Coldstar.

In 2021, Pavlou hosted a television show on the Discovery Channel titled Hunting Atlantis, which has been criticised by professional archaeologists for pseudoscience and contributing to false perceptions of history and archaeology.

== Selected works ==
Novels

- 2001 Decipher and related website Atlantipedia
- 2005 Gene
- 2017 Daniel Coldstar: The Relic War
- 2019 Daniel Coldstar: The Betrayer

Short stories

- 2006 "Checkpoint", published in Doctor Who Short Trips: The Centenarian
- 2007 "Omegamorphosis", published in Short Trips: Destination Prague
- 2007 "You Had Me at Verify User Name and Password", published in Short Trips: Snapshots

Screenplays

- 2002 Screenplay for The 51st State / Formula 51 (including the DVD extra Who the hell is Stel Pavlou?)
