= Decipher (novel) =

2001 novel by Stel Pavlou

- Author: Stel Pavlou
- Language: English
- Genre: Religion, thriller, mystery, speculative fiction
- Publisher: Simon & Schuster (UK) & St. Martin's Press (US)
- Publication date: 2001
- Publication place: United Kingdom
- Media type: Print (hardback & paperback)
- Pages: 624 (UK hardback edition) & 400 p. (US hardback edition)
- ISBN: 0-7432-0857-9 (UK hardback edition)
- OCLC: 50215869

Decipher (first published in 2001) is a speculative fiction novel by British author Stel Pavlou, published in 2001 in England by Simon & Schuster and 2002 in the United States by St. Martin's Press. The novel is about a fictional linguist, Richard Scott, and an assembled team of specialists who are in a race against time to crack a code found on ancient monuments around the world before an impending cataclysm predicted in mythology can strike. The story centers on the ancient city of Atlantis and features other mythical sites such as the Hall of Records.

Decipher was longlisted in the UK for the W.H. Smith Best New Talent Award 2002.

== Plot summary ==
Set in the year 2012, a series of seemingly unrelated events take place, which during the course of the story all become interconnected.

In Antarctica, an oil drilling venture is taking place by fictitious oil company Rola Corp. It is an unstable time in the region because the US and China are at loggerheads over mineral and oil rights, and the geopolitical landscape is dicey. The drill ship does not strike oil, but does discover a very hard form of diamond which turns out to be carbon 60. Not only that, but the samples they retrieve have hieroglyphic writing on them.

Meanwhile, the US military has been monitoring unusually high solar flare activity and is worried about its effect on their fleet of satellites. While observing Chinese military maneuvers in Antarctica, the spy satellite picks up a highly unusual energy signal emanating from two miles beneath Antarctica's ice sheet.

When the US military and Rola Corp. pool their resources it is discovered that not only is the diamond-type material reactive to the sun, but the time of the energy pulses under the ice in Antarctica match the timing of flare activity from the Sun.

A team of scientists are assembled to unravel the mystery. From Richard Scott, a linguistic anthropologist, to Jon Hackett a complexity physicist. The team soon discover that the same energy signature from Antarctica is being detected by satellites from ancient monuments all over the Earth. From the Amazon jungle to Egypt and China. Inspired by stories of the ancient flood of Noah, Scott embarks on the mammoth task of deciphering the mysterious language found on the material, and comparing what it has to say with the ancient myths and legends of floods from all around the world.

The myths all have similar themes. They talk about the Sun, the destructive power coming from the sky, a flood, and a mythical lost city, known more famously as Atlantis. More than that, the myths talk of the cyclical nature of this destruction and point to an event that happened 12,000 years ago that may well be happening all over again.

The story climaxes with the discovery of Atlantis under the ice in Antarctica and the team's expedition to reach it and find any crumb of help that may save the Earth from the impending disaster that the Sun is about to unleash as it reaches the maximum in its cycle.

== Reception ==
Critical reception to Decipher has been mixed. Kirkus Reviews praised the book, calling it a "Spellbinding mainstream science-fiction spectacular". Publishers Weekly wrote "The often ludicrous dialogue and the ham-fisted handling of human relations and motivations, however, make for an unfocused novel, one patched together like Frankenstein, with every stitching line, every unnatural feature, unblushingly exposed to the most casual glance." Nick Barrett of Blogcritics.org criticized the book's stereotypical characters, but that "Stel's sense of humour invariably steps in each time he goes right over the top."

The reviewer for The Philadelphia Inquirer was favorable, noting that it would make for a good film.
