= Emma Marie Birkmaier =

American educator

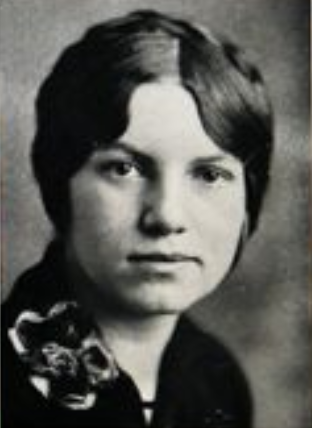
- Emma Marie Birkmaier, from the 1928 yearbook of the College of St. Catherine
- Born: June 1, 1908; Münich
- Died: November 26, 1985 (age 77); St. Paul, Minnesota, U.S.
- Other names: Emma Birkmaier Kogl
- Occupation: Educator
- Known for: First president of the American Council on the Teaching of Foreign Languages (1968)

Emma Marie Birkmaier Kogl (June 1, 1908 – November 26, 1985) was an American educator. Birkmaier taught at the University of Minnesota, and was founding president of the American Council on the Teaching of Foreign Languages (ACTFL).

== Early life and education ==
Birkmaier was born in Münich, and raised in St. Paul, Minnesota, the daughter of Joseph Birkmaier and Marie Birkmaier. Her parents were both born in Bavaria. She graduated from St. Catherine College in 1928. She completed doctoral studies at the University of Minnesota in 1949.

== Career ==
Birkmaier taught Russian at the University of Minnesota High School in 1945. She was a professor of German and language education at the University of Minnesota, until she retired in 1973. "If students can't see any relevancy between what they're learning in language and their everyday lives, they could care less," she told a 1972 interviewer about her classroom strategies.

Birkmaier was invited to speak to professional groups about education the Soviet Union during the Cold War. She was a visiting professor at the University of Nevada in 1954 and 1955, and at the University of Kansas in 1958. She was president of the Central States Modern Language Association. She was founding president of the American Council on the Teaching of Foreign Languages (ACTFL) in 1968. St. Catherine University presented her with their Alexandrine Medal in 1969.

== Publications ==
- "Needs Before We Can Teach Russian Effectively at the Ninth Grade Level" (1949)
- Illustrative Learning Experiences: University High School in Action (1952, book)
- "The Core Curriculum: A Promising Pattern for the Education of Adolescents" (1955)
- "The Teaching of Foreign Languages" (1961)
- "Modern Languages: Vehicle for the Humanities" (1962)
- "A Selective Bibliography on the Teaching of Foreign Languages, 1920–1966" (1968, with Dale L. Lange)
- Deutsch unserer Zeit (1969, with Hans Heinrich Wängler and Keith Anderson)
- Foreign language education: an overview (1976)
- Foreign language learning, today and tomorrow : essays in honor of Emma M. Birkmaier (1979, a festschrift in her honor)

== Personal life and legacy ==
Birkmaier married fellow educator Rudolph Frank Kogl; he was born in Austria. Her husband died in 1983, and she died from leukemia in 1985, at the age of 77. In 1980, the ACTFL established Emma Marie Birkmaier Award for Doctoral Dissertation Research in World Language Education.
