= Traci Harding =

Australian speculative fiction writer

- Born: 1964 (age 61–62); Carlingford, New South Wales
- Occupation: Author
- Writing career
- Genre: Science Fantasy

Traci Harding (born 1964) is an Australian novelist. Her work blends fantasy, fact, esoteric belief, time travel and quantum physics, into adventurous romps through history, alternative dimensions, universes and states of consciousness.

She was born and raised in Carlingford, a western suburb of Sydney, New South Wales. Harding states that her early interests were, "music, boys, daydreaming and storytelling". After leaving school she first pursued an interest in music, and then worked in film studio management for several years where she wrote and developed film scripts, and later began writing novels.

== Works ==
=== Novels ===
- The Ancient Future trilogy

- The Ancient Future: The Dark Age (1996)
- An Echo in Time: Atlantis (1997)
- Masters of Reality: The Gathering (1998)

- The Alchemist's Key (1999)
- The Celestial Triad

- Chronicle of Ages (2000)
- Tablet of Destinies (2001)
- Cosmic Logos (2002)

- Ghostwriting (2002) (short stories)
- The Book of Dreams (2003)
- The Mystique Trilogy

- Gene of Isis (2005)
- The Dragon Queens (2007)
- The Black Madonna (2008)

- Triad of Being Trilogy

- Being of the Field (2009)
- The Universe Parallel (2010)
- The Light-Field (2012 - February)

- The Timekeepers (trilogy)

- Dreaming of Zhou Gong (February 2013)
- The Eternity Gate (January 2014)
- AWOL (February 2015)

- The Storytellers Muse (2016)
- The Immortal Bind (2017)
- This Present Past (2018) (prequel to The Ancient Future trilogy)
- The Twelve Chapters of the Infinite Night (2022)
