= Time Cracks =

- Created by: David Gurney
- Starring: Jemma Gates; John Xintavelonis; Robyn Moore
- Country of origin: Australia
- No. of episodes: 26

Production
- Running time: 3 minutes

Original release
- Network: ABC
- Release: 2004 – 2004

Time Cracks is an Australian animated television series created by David Gurney and produced by the Tasmanian animation studio Blue Rocket. The series features three characters who travel through time to report on notable events in history. The cartoon screened on ABC in Australia from 2004 and has a duration of three minutes per episode, and is described by The Screen Guide as a "3D-animated series. Two animal reporters and their dopey sidekick travel through time in a dodgy hot-dog van in search of stories for a low budget time-travel magazine."

The characters include Emily the echidna, Milo the dog, and 58 the sheep. They serve as journalists who work for a mediocre time travel magazine. Using an unreliable time travel prototype device, the characters utilize cracks in time to travel back into history, in search of news to report on.
