= Abathor =

2024 video game

- Developer: Pow Pixel Games
- Publisher: Jandusoft
- Composers: Gatex; Daniel Teles; Soyo Oka; Gryzor87; J. A. Martín Tello
- Platforms: Windows; Nintendo Switch; PlayStation 4; PlayStation 5; Xbox One; Xbox Series X and Series S
- Release: July 25, 2024
- Genres: Platformer, Hack and slash, Action game
- Modes: Single-player, multiplayer

Abathor is a 2D hack & slash platformer video game developed by Pow Pixel Games and published by Jandusoft. It is designed as a retro game inspired by classic action titles from the 1980s and 1990s, featuring pixel art graphics that emulate the visual style of that era. The game was released for Microsoft Windows, Nintendo Switch, PlayStation 4, PlayStation 5, Xbox One, Xbox Series X and Series S in July 2024. The game supports up to four players, who take on the roles of heroes defending Atlantis from a demonic invasion originating from Abathor.

== Gameplay ==
Multiplayer mode with four players.

Abathor features 52 stages divided across 10 distinct zones, each with its own set of environments, enemies, and obstacles. The game follows a structured progression system in which players must complete each stage in sequence to advance. Every zone consists of five stages, with the final stage featuring a boss battle that must be cleared to unlock the next zone. Additionally, an extra stage is available when playing on the highest difficulty setting.

Stages in Abathor vary in design and mechanics, incorporating different gameplay elements beyond standard platforming. Some levels feature moving minecarts that require precise timing to navigate hazards, while others focus on platforming challenges with shifting or disappearing platforms. Puzzle-based stages introduce environmental interactions that players must solve to progress. The game also includes shoot-'em-up style levels, where the gameplay shifts to a side-scrolling format with different controls. Throughout the game, players encounter a variety of enemies, with more than 100 different enemy types appearing across the zones. All enemies have distinct movement patterns, attack styles, and behaviors. Each stage includes strategically placed checkpoints, allowing the players to restart from designated points within a level upon defeat rather than starting over from the beginning. The game includes three selectable difficulty levels.

== Plot ==
The Atlanteans, driven by greed, opened the gates of Abathor in search of an endless source of power. Upon opening the gates, hundreds of demons escaped, wreaking havoc and destroying everything in their path. Players control heroes who must fight their way through the continent of Atlantis, defeating demons to reach the gates of Abathor and seal them once and for all.

== Development and release ==
Abathor is inspired by Greek myths surrounding Atlantis, as well as the writings of Robert E. Howard and H.P. Lovecraft. Names, maps, and locations are influenced by the works of Plato.

The game was released in physical format in September 2024, offering both Standard and Collector's Editions, distributed by Tesura Games.

Updated version Abathor - Ultimate Edition was released on April 17, 2025. The major differences from the original are upgraded handcrafted world map, balanced difficulty modes, speedrun mode and ability for characters to run.

== Reception ==
Reception

Aggregate scores
Aggregator	Score
Metacritic	PS5: 90/100; PC: 78/100; NS: 70/100
OpenCritic	67% recommend

Review scores
Publication	Score
MeriStation	8/10
Nintendo Life	7/10 stars
The Games Machine (Italy)	7.5/10

Abathor received generally favorable reviews from critics, achieving a Metacritic score of 78/100 and an OpenCritic average of 78.

Nintendo Life awarded the game a 7/10, stating that Abathor has a "lovely pixel art and chiptune soundtrack," while praising the four-player co-op mode.

PlayStation Universe rated the game 9/10, highlighting its "exceedingly well-crafted" design, retro-inspired visuals, and soundtrack that complements the gameplay.

The Games Machine (Italy) scored Abathor 7.5/10, commending its revival of a long-dormant genre and its balanced, entertaining co-op gameplay.
