= Christia Sylf =

French novelist (1924–1980)

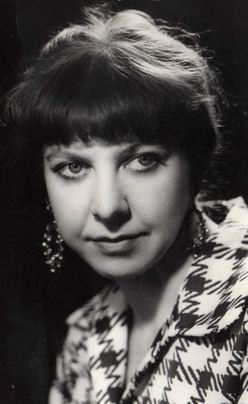
- Born: Christiane Léonie Adélaïde Richard; September 28, 1924; Paris, France
- Died: November 28, 1980 (aged 56); Entrevaux, France
- Occupation: Novelist
- Writing career
- Genre: Heroic fantasy

Christia Sylf was the pseudonym of Christiane Léonie Adélaïde Richard, born 28 September 1924 in Paris, died on 28 November 1980 in Entrevaux (Alpes-de-Haute-Provence). She was a French writer of fantasy.

== Overview ==
Christia Sylf's novels were pure heroic fantasy. Kobor Tigan't (1969) and its sequel, Le Règne de Ta [The Reign Of Ta] (1971), take place thirty thousand years ago, during the reign of the Giants, a mythical pre-Atlantean race which preceded ours.

The novel tells of the conflict between the sorcerous Queen-Mother, Abim, and her daughters Opak, who rules Kobor Tigan’t, the five-levelled City of the Giants, and her sister, Ta. The world of Kobor Tigan’t is inhabited by a race of reptilian bisexual humanoids, the T’los, who are used as sex slaves by the Giants. The novels also feature the crystal-like Elohim, messengers of occult alien powers from beyond, dragons and a host of other fantastic creatures.

The Kobor Tigan’t novels are clearly heroic fantasy, yet would be hard to compare to anything published in England or America. They contain numerous erotic scenes as well as esoteric elements that one rarely finds in the more literary worlds of J. R. R. Tolkien or Robert E. Howard. They are written in a rich, colorful prose and even include a glossary of the language of the Giants.

Sylf continued her saga with Markosamo le Sage [Markosamo The Wise] (1973), this time with a story featuring the reincarnations of all her principal characters, but taking place twenty thousand years ago, during the Age of Atlantis.

A comic strip was created to illustrate this work in 2022 by Vincent POMPETTI, who is called "The Sage of Atlantis". ( editions https://tartamudoboutique.eproshopping.fr/1773200-Le-sage-d-Atlantide-Vincent-Pompetti )

A fourth volume, La Reine au Coeur Puissant [The Strong-Hearted Queen] (1979), carried on with a tale taking place in Ancient China, two thousand years ago.

Sylf had announced the publication of five more volumes in her series: La Geste d’Amoïnen [The Saga Of Amoinen], taking place in Nordic Finland; Amiona la Courtisane [Amiona The Courtesan], taking place in Renaissance Venice; Ertulie de Fons l’Abîme [Ertulia Of Fons-The-Abyss], taking place during the reign of the French King Louis XIV; and the two-volume L’Apocalypse de Kébélé [Kebele's Apocalypse], featuring her immortal narrator and taking place in the far future. Unfortunately, these works were never published because Sylf died in the early 1980s, soon after the publication of La Reine au Coeur Puissant [The Strong-Hearted Queen] (1979). Reportedly, she was working on an additional novel, taking place in Ancient Egypt, which was left uncompleted.

== Bibliography ==
- Kobor Tigan't (1969)
- Le Règne de Ta [The Reign Of Ta] (1971)
- Markosamo le Sage [Markosamo The Wise] (1973)
- La Patte de Chat [The Cat's Paw] (coll., 1974)
- La Reine au Coeur Puissant [The Strong-Hearted Queen] (1979)
