= Elizabeth Birkmaier =

American writer

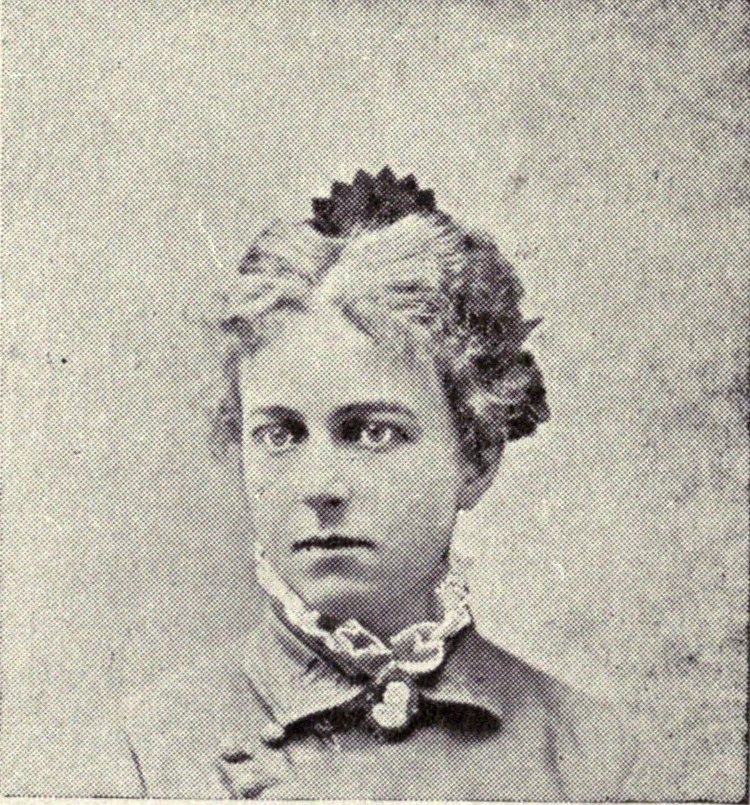
- Elizabeth Birkmaier, from an 1892 publication
- Born: Elizabeth Green Davey; March 31, 1845; Baltimore, Maryland, U.S.
- Died: December 30, 1912 (aged 67); East Orange, New Jersey, U.S.
- Occupations: Writer, clubwoman

Signature
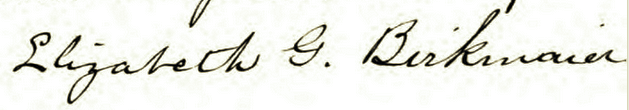

Elizabeth Green Davey Birkmaier (March 31, 1845 – December 30, 1912) was an American writer and clubwoman. She wrote a novel about Atlantis, Poseidon's Paradise (1892).

== Early life and education ==
Birkmaier was born in Baltimore, Maryland, the daughter of Hugh G. Davey and Maria W. Davey.

== Career ==
Birkmaier wrote a novel, Poseidon's Paradise (1892), and two dramas, Atlantis (1894) and Deucalion (1912), all based in the mythology of Atlantis. A review of her novel in The Overland Monthly called it "remarkable" and asked, "though we may suspect that Mrs. Birkmaier has made her ancients far too advanced in civilization in this or that particular, who shall say it was not her right to do it?" "It is evident that long and careful study has been given to the subject," noted the Alameda Daily Argus in its review, which admired her "peculiarly fresh inventive genius."

Birkmaier was founder and first president of the Tea Club of Alameda, California, and an active member of the Daughters of the American Revolution. In 1893, she and her husband were sued by the Women's Exchange and Relief Society for possession of the Women's Exchange building in Alameda, after a split in the club's membership when it was incorporated.

== Publications ==
- Poseidon's Paradise: The Romance of Atlantis (1892)
- "Lack of Harmony; Discord in the Woman's Exchange" (1893)
- "A Timely Lesson in Patriotism" (1898, a syndicated essay)

== Personal life and legacy ==
Elizabeth Davey married George Lewis Birkmaier. They lived in Alameda, California until 1898, and had three children. She died in 1912, at the age of 67, in East Orange, New Jersey.

Birkmaier's novel was one of the few works by women included in a 1959 bibliography of American science fiction from 1880 to 1915, with the note that it was "apparently the earliest American pseudo-historical romance to use the Atlantean setting." Poseidon's Paradise continues to be discussed by historians, more than a century after its publication.
