= Mothstorm =

2008 middle grade novel by Philip Reeve

- Author: Philip Reeve
- Illustrator: David Wyatt
- Language: English
- Series: Larklight
- Genre: Alternate History
- Publisher: Bloomsbury Publishing
- Publication date: October 2008
- Publication place: United Kingdom
- Media type: Print (Hardback)
- Pages: 400
- ISBN: 1-59990-303-2
- OCLC: 222663361
- LC Class: PZ7.R25576 Mot 2008
- Preceded by: Starcross

Mothstorm is a middle grade novel by Philip Reeve and released in October 2008. Illustrated by David Wyatt, it is the third book in the Larklight Trilogy, sequel to the 2007 novel Starcross.

== Plot ==
The novel begins with scientists noticing a mysterious cloud apparently nearing Earth through the Solar System. Eventually the issue comes to Mrs Mumby's ears and she manages to convince the British government to send a ship to Georgium Sidus (Uranus) to investigate. Mrs Mumby also takes her children upon the expedition, Art and Myrtle. Upon arriving to the edge of the cloud the explorers realise that the cloud consists of a great flock of giant moths, and within the cloud lies a miniature solar system inhabited by the blue lizards, called the Snilth, created and controlled by the Mothmaker, who is later revealed to be a Rogue Maker. As the ship nears, Mothstorm is attacked by Moth riders, During the ambush Art, Ulla and Sir Richard manage to evacuate and float down onto the surface of Georgium Sidus where they later come in contact with mer-people who live in the gas oceans. Jack and his crew are able to spot Art's signal flare and arrive to take them off the gas planet.

In the meantime, Myrtle and Mrs Mumby are taken along with the crew of the ship to the Mothmaker, at which point Mrs Mumby recognises the Mothmaker as a fellow maker and the Mothmaker kills her. Mrs Mumby later retakes the form of one of her old bodies when she meets up with Art and the crew of the Sophronia on the tin moon. She takes with her a small vial of essence which is able to kill a Maker.

By this time Mothstorm reaches Earth and the Snilth launch an invasion on England. In a turn of events Art, Mrs Mumby and Myrtle are able to kill the Mothmaker, and the Snilth all turn to Myrtle of all people to teach them all how to become gentle ladies, and make Sillisa their queen after they discover that she is a descendant of a long lost line of queens, the last of which had attempted to rebel against the Mothmaker.

The book ends with the Snilth leaving Earth to put their mini sun to orbit Hades (Pluto) and inhabit the planet under the rule of Sillisa. Meanwhile, as a reward for Jack's services, enough antidote is produced to turn back all the Venusian colonists.

== Characters ==
- Mrs Mumby - Art and Myrtle's mother, a Shaper who had at first created the Solar System.
- Art - Most of the book is written from his view. Art is keen on learning and exploring, and is friends with the reformed pirate Jack.
- Myrtle - Spoilt young lady, Art's sister. Extracts from her diary are used in the book.
- Jack - Previously pirate, now agent in the service of the Queen, Myrtle's lover.
- Mothmaker - Rogue Shaper, controller of Mothstorm.

== Reception ==
The Sunday Times called it "'Remarkable . . . Out of this world.'"

Kirkus Reviews said "this tale will satisfy fans in inimitably jolly fashion."
