= Moob =

Moob may refer to:

- Hmong people
- Hmong language
- A slang term for gynecomastia (portmanteau of "man" and "boob")
- A fictional alien species in Starcross (novel)
