= Philip Reeve =

English author and illustrator (born 1966)

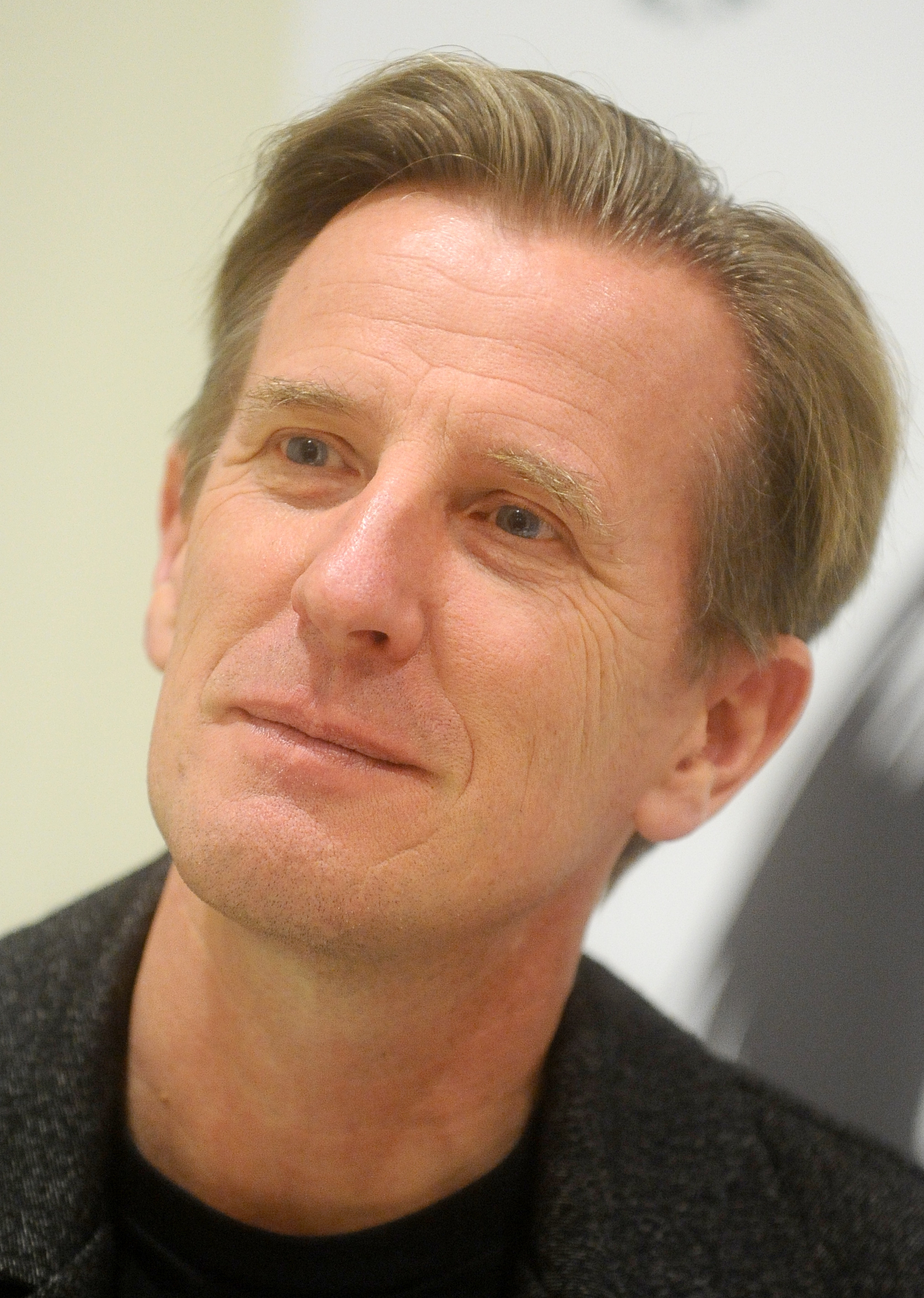
- Born: 28 February 1966 (age 60); Brighton, England
- Occupations: Writer, illustrator, author, young adult author
- Writing career
- Language: English language
- Period: 2001–present
- Genre: Science fiction
- Notable works: Mortal Engines Quartet; Larklight trilogy
- Notable awards: Guardian Prize; 2006; Carnegie Medal; 2008
- Website: philipreeve.com

Philip Reeve (born 28 February 1966) is an English author and illustrator of children's books, primarily known for the 2001 book Mortal Engines and its sequels (the 2001 to 2006 Mortal Engines Quartet). His 2007 novel, Here Lies Arthur, based on the legendary King Arthur, won the Carnegie Medal.

== Biography ==
Born on 28 February 1966 in Brighton, Reeve studied illustration, first at Cambridgeshire College of Arts and Technology (CCAT – now Anglia Ruskin University), where he contributed a comic strip to the Student Union magazine, and later at Brighton Polytechnic (now the University of Brighton). Before becoming an illustrator he worked at a bookshop in Brighton for several years. During his student years and for a few years afterwards he wrote for and performed in comedy sketch shows with a variety of collaborators under various group names, among them The Charles Atlas Sisters. He lives on Dartmoor with his wife Sarah Reeve and their son Sam.

With Brian Mitchell, Reeve is the author of a 1998 dystopian comic musical, The Ministry of Biscuits.

"Stop! Think before you eat that biscuit! Is it in any way fancy? If so, then you are a criminal! In Post-War London, The Ministry of Biscuits casts its sinister shadow over every tea-time and elevenses in the land. Established to 'control biscuits, and to control the idea of biscuits', it prohibits decadent sweetmeats, such as the Gypsy Cream."

This was performed at the Pavilion Theatre, Brighton, the Yvonne Arnaud Theatre, Guildford, and the 1999 Edinburgh Fringe Festival. It underwent a revival in 2005 at the Sallis Benney Theatre, Brighton, and began playing at Brighton's Lantern Theatre in November 2017. It has also toured to various other locations throughout the United Kingdom.

Mitchell and Reeves also wrote the musical Lord God together.

Reeve provided cartoons for books, including those in the Horrible Histories and Murderous Maths series. He wrote the Buster Bayliss series of books for young readers, which includes Night of the Living Veg, The Big Freeze, Day of the Hamster, and Custardfinger. He is the author and illustrator of a Dead Famous non-fiction book: Horatio Nelson and His Victory.

Reeve's first book for older readers was Mortal Engines, which won the Nestlé Smarties Book Prize in age category 9–11 years and made the Whitbread Book Award shortlist. Mortal Engines is the first book in a series sometimes called the Mortal Engines Quartet (2001–2006), which includes Predator's Gold, Infernal Devices and A Darkling Plain. The books feature two young adventurers, Tom Natsworthy and Hester Shaw, living in a lawless post-apocalyptic world inhabited by moving cities. For the fourth volume, Reeve won the once-in-a-lifetime 2006 Guardian Children's Fiction Prize, judged by a panel of British children's writers.

Reeve spent more than ten years on Mortal Engines, coming up with ideas in 1989 or 1990, leading to publication in 2001. He was working on it part-time between illustration jobs, but as he became sure he could complete such a project, he cut down his illustration work and devoted more time to writing.

The 2007 novel Here Lies Arthur is an alternative version of the Arthurian legend. Reeve and Arthur won the annual Carnegie Medal from the British librarians, recognizing the year's best children's book published in the UK.

The Larklight trilogy (2006–2008) is steampunk set in outer space. The first book Larklight was being developed as a film by the Indian director Shekhar Kapur, but he is no longer involved. Reeve professes that when planning out a novel, "I see it as a film that I run in my head, and I just keep running alternative versions of it until I come up with a cut I like. The future of the film is now in the hands of the Swedish director Tomas Alfredson.

Reeve began a series of Mortal Engines prequels with Fever Crumb (Scholastic UK, 2009). The first was one of eight finalists for the 2010 Carnegie Medal. In March 2020 Reeve said he did not intend to finish or publish a fourth book in the Fever Crumb series, as too much time had passed, thereby forgoing the world of Mortal Engines.

In 2013, Reeve had his first co-authored, highly illustrated book with British-American writer-illustrator Sarah McIntyre published by Oxford University Press: Oliver and the Seawigs. This went on to win the UKLA Award. Their third book, Pugs of the Frozen North, won an Independent Bookshop Week children's book award. The pair have a contract with the same publisher for a series of four more books, beginning with The Legend of Kevin.

In 2018, Reeve praised the 2018 Mortal Engines film adaptation, saying the director, Christian Rivers, had "done a fantastic job – a huge, visually awesome action movie with perfect pace and a genuine emotional core.... There are many changes to the characters, world, and story, but it's still fundamentally the same thing." In the Reevening in March 2020, he acknowledged the film's shortcomings, but thoughts of the filmmakers liking the books led him to welcome the US-New Zealand two-hour film co-production as the best "you could hope for [in your lifetime]". On November 18, 2020, upon asked whether Mortal Engines would be rebooted for the television screens, he responded that, while that would be nice, it seemed unlikely.

Most recently, while writing books, Reeve has been making independent films with his wife, Sarah Reeve, under the name Bonehill Films. Their films include Gwenevere (2023), Prairie Rascals (2025) and they are currently working on Invisible Pictures.

== Writing methods ==
Reeve claims not to be a methodical writer. He plans nothing at all, usually starting with an opening image, a closing image, and a few vague notions for the things that happen in between. This leads to thousands of words of rough draft material being abandoned – even entire novels, such as with Fever Crumb and Mortal Engines. However, he takes ideas from these abandoned drafts to build the final version. It usually takes him a year to move a novel from first idea to publication – six months actively writing it, the rest editing and thinking.

== Works ==
=== Young adult novels ===
Mortal Engines Universe

1. Mortal Engines Quartet, called Hungry City Chronicles in the United States:
  1. Mortal Engines (2001)
  2. Predator's Gold (2003)
  3. Infernal Devices (2005)
  4. A Darkling Plain (2006)
  - Traction City (World Book Day, 2011), a novella, rewritten as "Traction City Blues" short story
  - The Traction Codex: An Historian's Guide to the Era of Predator Cities (2012), with Jeremy Levett, guide
  - Night Flights: A Mortal Engines Collection (2018), illustrated by Ian McQue, prequel, collection of 3 short stories:
    "Frozen Heart", "Traction City Blues", "Teeth of the Sea"
  - The Illustrated World of Mortal Engines (2018), with Jeremy Levett, guide
2. Fever Crumb series, prequel:
  1. Fever Crumb (2009)
  2. A Web of Air (2010)
  3. Scrivener's Moon (2011)
3. Tamsin Pook, prequel:
  - Thunder City (2024)
  - Bridge of Storms (2026)

Larklight trilogy

(illustrated by David Wyatt)

1. Larklight (2006)
2. Starcross (2007)
3. Mothstorm (2008)

Railhead trilogy

1. Railhead (2015)
2. Black Light Express (2016)
3. Station Zero (2018)

Utterly Dark series

- Utterly Dark and the Face of the Deep (2021)
- Utterly Dark and the Heart of the Wild (2022)
- Utterly Dark and the Tides of Time (2023)

Stand-alones

- Here Lies Arthur (2007)
- No Such Thing As Dragons (2009)

=== Short stories ===
- "Doctor Who: The Roots of Evil" (2013), No. 4 from Doctor Who 50th Anniversary E-Shorts series

=== Children's short stories ===
- "The Exeter Riddles" (2013)

=== Children's books ===
Buster Bayliss series:

1. Night of the Living Veg (2002)
2. The Big Freeze (2002)
3. Day of the Hamster (2002)
4. Custardfinger! (2003)

Goblins series (page decorations by Dave Semple)

1. Goblins (2012)
2. Goblins vs Dwarves (2013)
3. Goblin Quest (2014)

Reeve & McIntyre Production series, published in the US as A Not-So-Impossible Tale (written together with, and illustrated by Sarah McIntyre):

1. Oliver and the Seawigs (2013), published in the US as Oliver and the Sea Monkeys
2. Cakes in Space (2014)
3. Pugs of the Frozen North (2015)
4. Jinks & O'Hare Funfair Repair (2016), published in the US as Carnival in a Fix
- Pug-a-Doodle-Do! (2017), activity book

Roly-Poly Flying Pony series with co-author Sarah McIntyre:

1. The Legend of Kevin (2018)
2. Kevin's Great Escape (2019)
3. Kevin and the Biscuit Bandit (2020)
4. Kevin vs the Unicorns (2021)

Adventuremice series with co-author Sarah McIntyre:

1. Adventuremice: Otter Chaos (2023)
2. Adventuremice: Mermouse Mystery (2023)
3. Adventuremice: Mice on the Ice (2023)
4. Adventuremice: Mice on the Moon (2024)
5. Adventuremice: The Ghostly Galleon (2024)
6. Adventuremice: Mice, Camera, Action! (2025)
7. Adventuremice: Mousehole to the Centre of the Earth (2025)
8. Adventuremice: Of Mice and Mummies (2026)
9. Adventuremice: Mini Mice Mayhem (2026)
10. Adventuremice: Those Magnificent Mice in their Flying Machines (Spring 2027)

Stand-alone:

- The Angry Aztecs And The Incredible Incas: Two Books In One (2001), with Terry Deary, from Horrible Histories Collections series

=== Non-fiction ===
- Horatio Nelson and His Victory (2003), history, from Dead Famous series

=== As illustrator ===
- Awful Art (1997), by Michael Cox
- Henry Spaloosh! (1997), by Chris d'Lacey
- Murderous Maths series (from 1997), by Kjartan Poskitt
- Isaac Newton and His Apple (1999), by Kjartan Poskitt
- The Incredible Incas (2000), by Terry Deary
- Pantsacadabra! (2006), by Kjartan Poskitt
- Urgum the Axeman (2006), by Kjartan Poskitt
- Borgon the Axeboy series (from 2014), by Kjartan Poskitt
- Gawain and the Green Knight (2016), Oxford Reading Tree series, by the Pearl Poet, retold by Philip Reeve

== Adaptation ==
- Mortal Engines (2018), film directed by Christian Rivers, based on the novel Mortal Engines
- Goblins (TBA), an upcoming Laika film directed by Mark Gustafson, Based on the novel Goblins

== Bonehill Films ==
- Gwenevere (2023)
- Prairie Rascals (2025)
- Invisible Pictures (2026)
- Bad Access to Hennock (upcoming)
