= Fever Crumb =

2009 young adult novel by Philip Reeve

- Author: Philip Reeve
- Language: English
- Series: Fever Crumb Series
- Genre: Steampunk
- Publisher: Scholastic Corporation
- Publication date: 5 May 2009
- Publication place: United Kingdom
- Media type: Print (Hardback, Paperback)
- Pages: 336
- ISBN: 978-1-4071-0242-9
- OCLC: 310156545
- Followed by: A Web of Air

Fever Crumb is a young adult post-apocalyptic science fiction novel by Philip Reeve, published in 2009. The first in a series, it is followed by A Web of Air in 2010 and Scrivener's Moon in 2011. The books of the Fever Crumb series are prequels to the Mortal Engines Quartet series of novels by the same author.

== Plot ==
Fever Crumb is a 14-year-old girl raised by engineer Dr. Giddeon Crumb. She serves as an apprentice and is a member of the Order of Engineers in the not-yet traction city of London. She leaves her sheltered life to help find archaeologist Kit Solent on a secret project.

Within a few days of working for Kit, she is recognized by Bagman Creech, the legendary killer/skinner of Scriven. He tries to kill her, forcing her to flee the city. The Scriven were a race superior to humans and were violent rulers of London until rebellion forced them out. Bagman is a hunter who wants to get rid of any evidence of Scriven. It is revealed that the mother of Fever, Wavey Godshawk, is a Scriven, and more importantly, she is the daughter of the Scriven leader Auric Godshawk. As both of them eventually leave London to join "The Movement", Kit is wounded in an attack. They make it to "The Movement" and Kit eventually dies. The body of Kit Solent is turned into a Stalker (a mechanical undead warrior) called Shrike, one of many turned into Stalkers that year. Her mother performs the transformation. Shrike does not possess the memories of his previous life, knowing only the Movement's objectives. The movement moves to attack London and Land admiral Quercus challenges the London Mayor to a fight in which he is victorious. Fever and her mother Wavey return to the vault buried beneath the former home of Auric Godshawk.

Within the vault are plans and engines constructed by Auric to move London, making it mobile. Shrike kills the other Stalkers accompanying them and leaves. Fever heads to the Solent children, hoping to protect them. Unknown, a person named Charley Shallow followed them, and uses a magneto gun, carried by Fever, to attack Shrike. It was only designed to hurt robots and shoots Fever. However, Fever does not die, and falls to the ground, having certain mechanical parts inside her. Charley, believing he killed Fever, walks away. Shrike does not hurt anyone. Fever takes the Children and escape, paddling down a river and joins a traveling group of actors, welcoming them in.

== Reception ==
Kirkus Reviews called it an "essential read for fans great entry point for newcomers to the world".

Dash Cooray of Fantasy Book Review gave Fever Crumb a 9.7 out of 10. He praised the "amazing details" that the author put into the book, and praising how Philip Reeve "has a talent for creating endearing female protagonists that are unconventional and rather deep".

The Guardian praised the "terrific read", a great prequel to the Mortal Engines Quartet, all the while crediting Philip Reeve as a fantastic author.

== Awards and recognition ==
- 2010 Shortlist for the Carnegie Medal
- 2011 American Library Association Notable Children's Book for Older Readers
