= Sarah McIntyre =

British-American illustrator

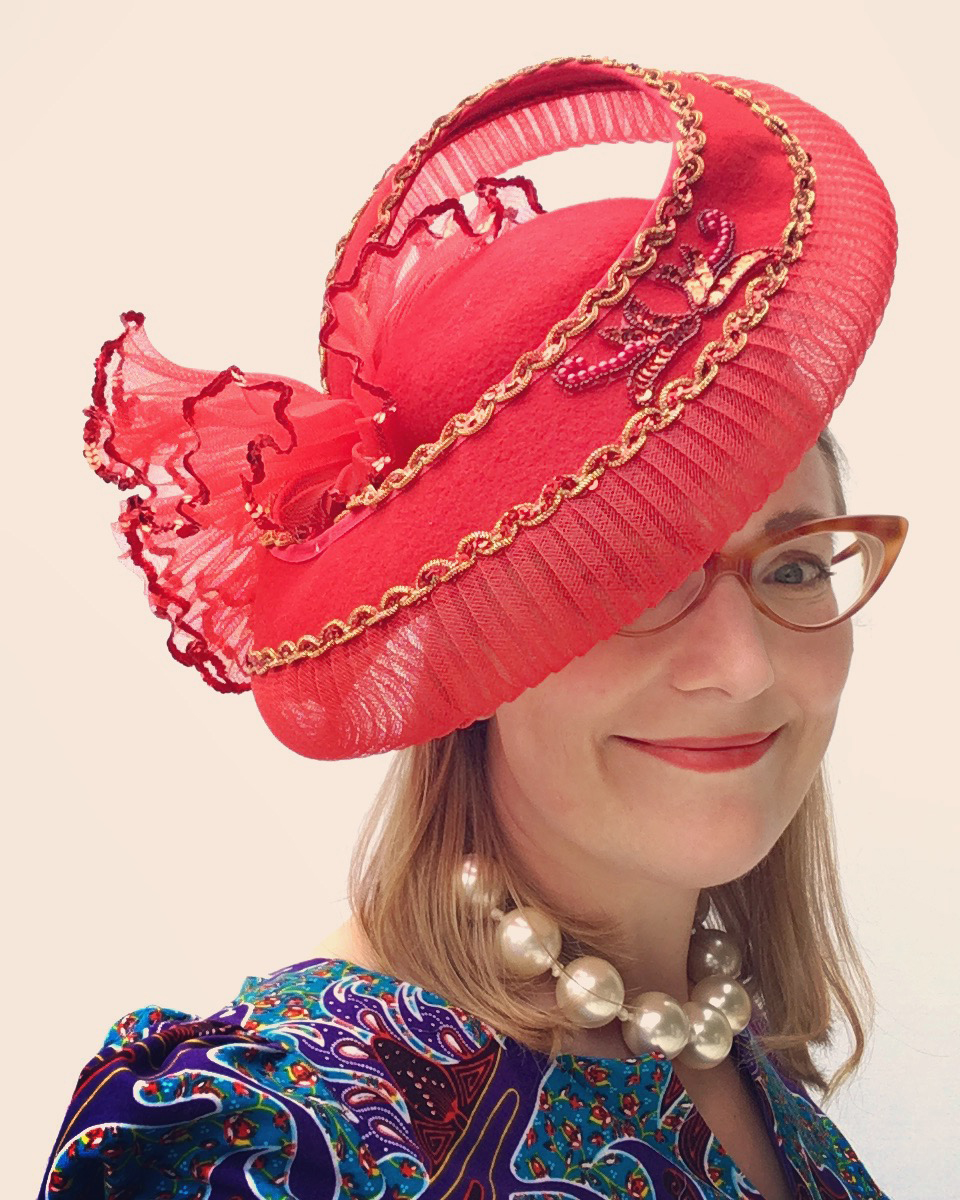
- Sarah McIntyre
- Born: Seattle, Washington, US
- Occupations: Illustrator, writer
- Writing career
- Genres: children's books, picture books
- Website: www.jabberworks.co.uk

Sarah McIntyre is a British-American illustrator and writer of children's books and comics. She graduated in 1999 from Bryn Mawr College with a degree in Russian and a minor degree in history of art and earned her master's degree in illustration at Camberwell College of Arts in 2007. She works from a studio in Bovey Tracey, Devon and lives with her husband, Stuart.

McIntyre was awarded the Sheffield Children's Book award for Best Picture Book and Overall Winner for her illustrations in the book Morris the Mankiest Monster in 2010, which also won the Bishop's Stortford Picture Book Award 2010. Her book Oliver and the Seawigs with Philip Reeve won the UKLA Book Award in 2015 in the age 7–11 category and their Pugs of the Frozen North won the Independent Bookshop Week Book Award in 2016. She also won the Leeds Graphic Novel Award 2011 for Vern and Lettuce, which ran originally as a weekly comic strip in The DFC and in The Guardian. Her comic strip Shark & Unicorn ran for three years in The Funday Times section of The Sunday Times newspaper.

Her projects include designing Monsterville at Discover Children's Story Centre in Stratford, London and participation in its online StoryCloud project. She curated The Comics Big-Top of Awesome at the 2012 Pop Up Festival in London. In 2015 she began spearheading the #Pictures Mean Business campaign, demanding greater prominence and credit for book illustrators. For her campaign efforts, The Bookseller listed her as one of their 2016 Rising Stars. She is represented by Jodie Hodges at United Agents in London.

== Books ==
=== Solo picture books ===
- Don't Call Me Grumpycorn (2020) UK: Scholastic UK
- Grumpycorn (2019) UK: Scholastic UK
- Dinosaur Firefighters (2018) UK: Scholastic UK
- The New Neighbours (2018) UK: David Fickling Books
- Dinosaur Police (2015) UK: Scholastic UK
- There's a Shark in the Bath (2014) UK: Scholastic UK

=== Reeve & McIntyre books ===
- Adventuremice: Those Magnificent Mice in their Flying Machines Adventuremice Book 10 with Philip Reeve (Spring 2027) UK: David Fickling Books
- Adventuremice: Mini Mice Mayhem Adventuremice Book 9 with Philip Reeve (2026) UK: David Fickling Books
- Adventuremice: Of Mice and Mummies Adventuremice Book 8 with Philip Reeve (2026) UK: David Fickling Books
- Adventuremice: Mousehole to the Centre of the Earth Adventuremice Book 7 with Philip Reeve (2025) UK: David Fickling Books
- Adventuremice: Mice, Camera, Action! Adventuremice Book 6 with Philip Reeve (2025) UK: David Fickling Books
- Adventuremice: The Ghostly Galleon Adventuremice Book 5 with Philip Reeve (2024) UK: David Fickling Books
- Adventuremice: Mice on the Moon Adventuremice Book 4 with Philip Reeve (2024) UK: David Fickling Books
- Adventuremice: Mice on the Ice Adventuremice Book 3 with Philip Reeve (2023) UK: David Fickling Books
- Adventuremice: Mermouse Mystery Adventuremice Book 2 with Philip Reeve (2023) UK: David Fickling Books
- Adventuremice: Otter Chaos Adventuremice Book 1 with Philip Reeve (2023) UK: David Fickling Books
- Kevin vs the Unicorns Roly-Poly Flying Pony Book 4 with Philip Reeve (2021) UK: Oxford University Press
- Kevin and the Biscuit Bandit Roly-Poly Flying Pony Book 3 with Philip Reeve (2020) UK: Oxford University Press
- Kevin's Great Escape Roly-Poly Flying Pony Book 2 with Philip Reeve (2019) UK: Oxford University Press
- The Legend of Kevin Roly-Poly Flying Pony Book 1 with Philip Reeve (2018) UK: Oxford University Press
- Pug-a-Doodle-Do! with Philip Reeve (2017) UK: Oxford University Press
- Jinks & O'Hare Funfair Repair with Philip Reeve (2016) UK: Oxford University Press
- Pugs of the Frozen North with Philip Reeve (2015) UK: Oxford University Press
- Cakes in Space with Philip Reeve (2014) UK: Oxford University Press
- Oliver and the Seawigs with Philip Reeve (2013) UK: Oxford University Press

=== Comic books ===
- 24 by 7 (contributor) comics anthology (2014) UK: LICAF Books
- Nelson (contributor) Graphic Novel (2011) UK: Blank Slate Books
- Vern and Lettuce (2010) UK: David Fickling Books

=== Picture book collaborations ===
- The Faber Book of Bedtime Stories (illustrator) with Claire Barker, Ayesha Braganza, Lucy Farfort, Kieran Larwood, Rashmi Sirdeshpande, Ingrid Persaud, Emma Carroll, Ann Jungman, Reba Khatun, Lou Kuenzler, Michael Mann, Kate Saunders, Natasha Farrant, Aisha Bushby, Pip Jones, Martyn Ford, Hannah Lee (2022) UK: Faber Childrens
- The Prince of Pants with Alan MacDonald (2016) UK: Scholastic UK
- Jampires with David O'Connell (2014) UK: David Fickling Books
- Superkid with Claire Freeman (2013) UK: Scholastic UK
- You Can't Scare a Princess! with Gillian Rogerson (2011) UK: Scholastic UK
- You Can't Eat a Princess! with Gillian Rogerson (2010) UK: Scholastic UK
- When Titus Took the Train with Anne Cottringer (2010) UK: Oxford University Press
- Morris the Mankiest Monster (2009) UK: David Fickling Books with Giles Andreae
- Adventures of Riley: Mission to Madagascar with Laura Hurwitz and Amanda Lumry (2005) USA: Scholastic Inc
- Adventures of Riley: Dolphins in Danger with Laura Hurwitz and Amanda Lumry (2005) USA: Scholastic Inc
- Adventures of Riley: Amazon River Rescue with Laura Hurwitz and Amanda Lumry (2004) USA: Scholastic Inc
- Adventures of Riley: Safari in South Africa with Laura Hurwitz and Amanda Lumry (2003) USA: Scholastic Inc
- Adventures of Riley: Tigers in Terai with Laura Hurwitz and Amanda Lumry (2003) USA: Scholastic Inc
- Adventures of Riley: Quest for Treasure in the Cayman Islands with Laura Hurwitz and Amanda Lumry (2001) USA: Eaglemont Press
- Alistair on Safari: Adventure at an African Game Reserve with Laura Hurwitz and Amanda Lumry (2000) USA: Eaglemont Press
