= Larklight =

2006 middle grade novel by Philip Reeve

- Author: Philip Reeve
- Illustrator: David Wyatt
- Language: English
- Series: Larklight Trilogy
- Genre: Steampunk
- Publisher: Bloomsbury Publishing
- Publication date: October 2006
- Publication place: United Kingdom
- Media type: Print (hardback & paperback)
- Pages: 412
- ISBN: 0-7475-8240-8
- OCLC: 255773817
- Followed by: Starcross

Larklight, or the Revenge of the White Spiders! or to Saturn's Rings and Back! is a middle grade novel written by Philip Reeve and illustrated by David Wyatt. It is the first book in the Larklight Trilogy.

Larklight is a space opera set in an alternative Victorian era, in which mankind has been exploring the Solar System for at least a century, and wherein most of the planets are inhabitable. Protagonist Art Mumby narrates an attack on the British Empire and the Solar System at large by an ancient, arachnid-like extraterrestrial race, against which he and his family play a central role, aided by the pirate Jack Havock and his crew.

== Plot summary ==
The story begins at Larklight, a house that orbits Earth's moon, where the Mumbys receive a visitor from the Royal Xenological Society, a Mr. Webster, who is revealed to be an extra-terrestrial resembling an enormous white spider. Art and his sister Myrtle escape; but their father is captured and presumed dead.

Art and Myrtle leave in an escape pod and crash-land on the Moon, where they are encased with predatory larvae of the Potter Moth and freed by pirate Jack Havock and his crew. Art is shocked to find that Jack is only fifteen years old, and that he is the only human in his crew, while Myrtle is distressed at being in the company of a pirate and demands that Jack take them to the Moon's British residence, Fort George. En route aboard the pirates' ship Sophronia, a ship of the British Navy comes alongside and orders Jack to surrender or have his ship destroyed.

Jack distracts the officers by pretending to hold Art and Myrtle hostage, giving Ssillissa, the ship's alchemist, time to activate the ship's engines and fly the Sophronia to safety. They conceal themselves on Venus, Jack Havock's old home, where Jack tells Art and Myrtle that the colonists there, including his parents and brother, were changed into trees by a sudden pollination. The white spiders take Myrtle to the Martian home of industrialist Sir Waverly Rain, whose factories cover Phobos and Deimos. She escapes with a Martian maid named Ulla and her husband, Richard, with whom she learns that Sir Waverly Rain had been captured by the spiders and replaced with a spider-controlled automaton; believing the spiders might manufacture something much more sinister, they race to London.

Jack and Art visit Jupiter's moon Io, descending into Jupiter's atmosphere to ask aid of the Thunderhead, who tells them to protect the key to Larklight. Not knowing what this is, they attempt to leave Jupiter, but are abandoned by their ferryman and escape to a broken-down harpoon ship attached to a native organism. They are rescued by the Sophronia's crew. Jack discovers that Myrtle's locket (now in Art's possession) is the key to Larklight, in that it can activate a set of complex engines capable of transforming the solar system, and leads his crew to the spiders' home on the Rings of Saturn to exchange it for Myrtle's safe return.

Upon arriving at the spiders' home, most of the crew are captured. Art is later taken before Professor Phineas Ptarmigan, formerly of the Royal Xenological Institute where Jack was imprisoned until he was twelve, who reveals that he wishes to use Larklight to destroy the Solar System, leaving the remains to the spiders whose ancestors had colonized the planetesimals. Meanwhile, Ssillissa and her crewmate Yarg free the captured crew and two additional prisoners, Sir Waverly and Art's mother Emily.

Having freed Larklight from the spiders, the protagonists visit Earth, where a gigantic mechanical spider is attacking London. There, Myrtle takes control of the machine and uses it to kill Mr. Webster, and later re-unites with her family and Jack. The epilogue reveals that the race of white spiders has not been exterminated, but subdued, and that Ptarmigan has been placed in an insane asylum. The Mumby family return to live at Larklight, which they deprive of its otherworldly machinery.

== Film adaptation ==
Warner Bros. bought the rights to Larklight in 2006. In April 2008, Shekhar Kapur announced that he was to direct, and that he and Steven Knight had been working on the screenplay for three months. He said that it would have a budget of $200 million and would be his most expensive movie. Alison Greenspan and Di Novi were to produce. The film was to be released on 1 January 2010, but after the death of the director Anthony Minghella in 2008, Kapur took over his unfinished movie New York, I Love You, and postponed Larklight.

== See also ==
- Mars in fiction
- Venus in fiction
