= Larklight trilogy =

2006-09 middle grade book series by Philip Reeve

- Larklight; Starcross; Mothstorm
- Author: Philip Reeve
- Illustrator: David Wyatt
- Country: England
- Language: English
- Genre: Steampunk
- Publisher: Bloomsbury Publishing
- Published: 2006-2009

The Larklight trilogy is a trilogy of middle grade novels by Philip Reeve, entitled Larklight, Starcross, and Mothstorm. These books are all illustrated by David Wyatt.

== Setting ==
The Larklight trilogy is set in an alternative Victorian-era universe, where mankind has been exploring the Solar System for at least a century. Earth is the same as it was in the late 19th century, but only the United Kingdom and its Empire possess the engines to travel across the Solar System. The United States, which the British consider to be rebellious colonies, and France, though not technically at war with Britain on Earth, are in a struggle to sabotage the Britons' expansive interests and develop space technology of their own. London, the centre of the universe, has many spaceports and is the base of many organisations such as the Royal Xenological Society.

== Larklight ==
Larklight is the first book in the series. The story begins in the Larklight manor where they have a visitor. However, soon, white spiders from Saturn (the first ones) invade Larklight and they have to save the known universe from a madman.

== Starcross ==
Starcross, the second book in the trilogy begins when Art Mumby and his prim older sister Myrtle, at their home (Larklight) with their mother and father, receive a strange invitation to the Starcross hotel, located in the asteroid field.

== Mothstorm ==
Mothstorm, the third book and the last book in the trilogy, was published in hardback in October 2008. The paperback was scheduled to be published on 6 July 2009. They fight giant moths, and a race of blue lizards led by a Rogue Shaper.

== Film adaptations ==
Warner Bros. had planned a $200 million adaptation of the first book Larklight, with Shekhar Kapur directing, however, the film was never released. The film was planned to be released January 1, 2010, but after the death of director Anthony Minghella, Shekhar Kapur took over his unfinished movie, New York, I Love You, and Larklight had to be postponed.
