= Buster Bayliss =

2002–03 children's book series by Philip Reeve

- Night of the Living Veg; The Big Freeze; Day of the Hamster; Custard Finger!
- Author: Philip Reeve
- Country: England
- Language: English
- Genre: Children's literature
- Publisher: Scholastic Corporation
- Published: 2002-2003
- Media type: Book

Buster Bayliss is a series of books written by British author Philip Reeve, intended for younger readers. The main character of the series is Buster Bayliss. In the stories, Buster must stop someone or something taking over the world. The catchphrase which often appears on the cover of the books is where's there's trouble, there's Buster Bayliss. So far there are four books.

== Books ==
=== Night of the Living Veg ===
Buster is a normal school kid full of mischief. When his mom leaves on a business trip Buster is forced to stay with "Fake" Auntie Pauline her husband and her daughter Polly. As time passes Buster realises something is strange about Aunt's plant "Pablo". Soon everyone in Smogley are affected by the plants' strange gas and are hypnotised into loving them. He finds out a famous gardener is responsible for all this. One night Buster is attacked by the plant and fights it way by a bug killer (produced by the gardener himself). The next day after an argument with Polly, Buster goes to meet the gardener but he tries to force Buster into loving them. Buster escapes and also finds out that the bug killer he used will only fertilise them. Later Buster calls the Quike Brothers to help him hunt the monster but after a little misfortune Polly's dad is also hypnotised by the plant. Buster and the Quirkes are saved by Polly and learns music is the plants' weakness. Later with the help of the school band Buster and co. fight the killer plants but later Buster is captured by the gardener. The gardener is revealed to be a plant himself and the original gardener was eaten by him long ago. He tells them how he came to earth on a meteor and lived with the gardener to find out how humans ate plants as food. This scared the plant and it planned to take over the world where plants can have freedom. Buster tries to play the trumpet on him but the plant had slowly grown to fight back small amounts of music. Soon Polly who had come to save Buster gets eaten by the plant and angered by this Buster puts a song on the Boom box while the plant was distracted. The power of the music kills the plant and Polly escapes. In the end everyone who were affected by the plant had forgotten everything and the whole group said goodbye and went to their homes. Buster's mum comes back and asks what has been going on. Buster knowing somethings must not be told to his mum and says "You know, boring."

=== The Big Freeze ===
Was published in 2002. They are attacked by ice freaks.

=== Day of the Hamster ===
Was published in 2002.google

=== Custardfinger! ===
The only book in the series published in 2003. The evil lunch lady plans to take over the world using custard.
