= Traction City (novella) =

2008 novella by Philip Reeve

- Author: Philip Reeve
- Language: English
- Series: Mortal Engines Quartet
- Genre: Science fiction
- Publisher: Scholastic
- Publication date: 2011
- Publication place: United Kingdom
- Media type: Print (hardback and paperback)
- Pages: 293
- ISBN: 978-1-4071-2427-8
- OCLC: 50714166

Traction City is a novella by Philip Reeve and is a prequel to the Mortal Engines Quartet. It was released as a flip book alongside Chris Priestly's teachers' tales of terror for World Book Day. The novella is set in London and introduces street urchin Smiff, policeman Anders, and a young Anna Fang.

The story was later expanded into the short story titled "Traction City Blues" as part of the Night Flights short story collection, released in July 2018.

== Plot summary ==
Smiff is depicted as an orphan who lives on the lowest tier of London and scavenges items that have fallen through the cracks from higher tiers. Whilst scavenging, he witnesses a murder where the attacker has removed the right hand.

While not a fan of the police Smiff goes to the Airdock Green police station where a teenage Anna Fang has just been arrested by corporal Nutter as an Anti-Tractionist saboteur for carrying an explosive device. Smiff explains about the murder to Sergeant Anders who alongside Nutter leaves to investigate and come across the culprit who turns out to be a stalker. Meanwhile, constable Pym searches the records for similar incidents and finds reports about accidents that have occurred within a fortnight where the right hand has been removed and concludes that they were murders by the same killer.

Anders and Nutter return to the police station where Anna Fang explains that she has been following the stalker called The Collector who she wants to recruit to the Anti-tractionist cause. When asked why she feels The Collector wouldn't just attack her she talks about Shrike, another stalker who is a bounty hunter who refuses to harm children (like her). Anders concludes that it is highly likely that this is true given the fact that Smiff survived his encounter with The Collector. He decides to use Anna as bait to give them enough time to strap the explosive device she was found with to the stalker.

Along the way they find a dead apprentice engineer with a missing right hand who is younger than Anna Fang. They are surrounded by a group of Engineers who are a powerful guild in London. The Engineers explain that they brought The Collector on to London to see if they could use stalkers as soldiers, but lost control of The Collector. Afterwards the head of the engineers orders the death of the two police officers and Anna. Smiff had followed Anders and throws a tin and shouts explosive, scattering the engineers, which gives the group time to find cover.

The engineers regroup and charge towards the, are killed by The Collector who proceeds to chop of their right hands to see if they are a suitable replacement for his own missing hand. Concluding that the right hands aren't a match, The Collector heads towards the group. Anders tries to talk to him hoping to sacrifice himself to give the others time to escape. As he steps out he remembers Anna's explosive. While talking to The Collector he manages to distract him long enough to strap the explosive to him and escape. Afterwards he allows Anna Fang to escape, telling her to travel to the Anti-Traction league and allowing Smiff to stay at the station.
