= Fever Crumb (series) =

2009–11 young-adult book series by Philip Reeve

- Fever Crumb; A Web of Air; Scrivener's Moon
- Author: Philip Reeve
- Cover artist: David Frankland; David Wyatt
- Country: United Kingdom
- Language: English
- Genre: Science fiction Steampunk; Postapocalyptic
- Publisher: Scholastic
- Published: 2009–2011
- Media type: Print (hardback & paperback)
- Preceded by: Mortal Engines Quartet

The Fever Crumb series is the title of a series of novels written by British author, Philip Reeve, and is the prequel series to his Mortal Engines Quartet. The series consists of three books: Fever Crumb (2009), A Web of Air (2010), and Scrivener's Moon (2011). The books follow a young woman known as Fever Crumb, and her adventures set around the time of the creation of the first traction cities that become prevalent in the Mortal Engines series. While Reeve stated in 2011 that he had always envisaged a quartet for the series, assuring readers of a fourth installment, by 2020 he said that "too much time has passed", making it difficult to revisit the series, and that he did not intend to finish and publish a fourth book.

== Setting ==
The book series is set in the distant future, thousands of years after the Earth was ravaged by a conflict called the "Sixty Minute War", which almost destroyed civilization, leaving only bare remnants. Unlike in the Mortal Engines Quartet, set millennia later, the effects of this war can still be felt, as several mutant species were created by the fallout, including a quasi-sentient race of seagulls, known as "Angels," and a new race of Woolly Mammoth creatures that are seemingly explained by a throwback caused by excessive radiation. The humanoid "Scriven" race, practically extinct in the later work, are at first thought to also be mutants. It is later discovered that their creation was deliberate, with the longer lifespans and more resilient systems included in the Scriven design intended for the preservation of the human race in the harsh postwar conditions. The world has become geologically unstable, with vast natural disasters.

Large land barges feature prominently as smaller predecessors to the moving cities roaming for resources in the Mortal Engines Quartet. A war has been raging between the Nomads; this conflict is partially created by Land Admiral Nikola Quercus (later Nicholas Quirke), employing the theories of Auric Godshawk (a deceased Scriven scientist) to build a moving city.

== Plot summary ==
Before the events of series, the post-apocalyptic city of London is ruled by an evolved species of human called the Scriven. In the final years of Scriven rule, Dr. Gideon Crumb, a human engineer, falls in love with Wavey Godshawk, a Scriven and the daughter of London's ruler, Auric Godshawk. In a violent uprising known as the 'Skinner's riots', Auric and many other Scriven are killed in an act of genocide by the human citizens of London. Wavey, who lacks most of the distinctive markings of the Scriven, escapes with her newborn half-human baby, but then leaves her child with a friend who passes her onto Gideon along with a note saying 'Her name is Fever'. Wavey then flees across the country where she runs into a carnival run by a dwarf named Borglum. For several years she lives in peace with the carnival's staff, working on engines and building machines.

With Wavey gone into hiding, Gideon raises Fever as an adopted child in the engineerium for many years, until the twists and turns of fate forced him to explain the truth to her.

Fever leaves London to join the Lyceum, a traveling theatre with children whom she took care of after their father was murdered, where she starts growing out her previously close-cropped hair and begins to loosen up. She meets Arlo Thursday, an orphan boy who becomes her first love. Arlo had fallen in love with a girl named Thirza Blaizey, but she rejects him to marry the rich and powerful Jago Belkin. Although Arlo is originally distrusting towards Fever, even pointing a gun at her, they grow close enough for Arlo to unveil his plans of the world's first Aeroplane. Fever ends up fleeing along with Arlo after her life is threatened by unknown assailants. They retreat to Thursday Island and begin to construct Arlo's invention using wood, paper and an engine sent to him by another inventor, however this proves to be too heavy and so Fever puts her engineering talents to good use and improvises by cannibalizing a power supply and motor from a Stalker-Crab type creature which was built by Auric Godshawk and given to Arlo's family as a gift.

As the Aeroplane nears completion, Thursday Island is besieged by Jago Belkin, who has learned of Arlo's plan from Thirza, who enticed the information from Arlo's best friend and Angel, Weasel, before murdering him. Jago is accompanied by a legion of soldiers (The London engineer Dr Teal also shows up after the initial assault), who corner Arlo and Fever in a derelict tower where the Aeroplane is kept. Jago is killed in the final confrontation, which leads to Fever successfully flying the world's first Aeroplane for several minutes before it plummets into the sea. Fever and Arlo are picked up by Wavey Godshawk and Dr. Crumb, Fever's parents, who persuade Fever to forget about the dreams of flight which she shared with Arlo and return to London, which is in the process of transforming into the first Traction City. Fever saves Arlo's life, but in doing so she is forced to betray him and his research. Breaking Fever's heart, Arlo sails away from Mayda and Thursday Island, never to return.

She leaves the Traveling Circus to work with Nicola Quercus and the Nomads, returning to London where she reconciles with Wavey and Gideon as the new London was built. Gideon becomes an important part of the engineering team behind the first Traction City, and lives happily with his lover and his daughter for a while.

Borglum and his circus return to London, where they tell Wavey and Fever of a great pyramid from the Ancient times that has recently broken open in an earthquake. Wavey, Fever, and Borglum set off to the North to investigate the pyramid properly. They are imprisoned by the Northern Nomad Rufus Raven. Wavey and Fever escape, but Wavey is brutally killed by a Stalker (possibly Shrike/Grike) while making sure that Fever escapes unharmed. Her death has a profound effect on the other characters, triggering Gideon Crumb's transformation into an antagonist, influencing Fever's journey into emotional acceptance of herself and leading Borglum into a terroristic strike against Raven, which in turn radically influences the outcome of the battle between the Nomads and the first Traction City.

Fever meets Cluny Morvish, a Nomadic girl who she falls in love with, making her the first confirmed bisexual character in the Sixty Minute War books. She leaves London behind for good after seeing what Quercus and her father have turned it into, settling into a more peaceful life with her Cluny, who is now her girlfriend.

The news of Wavey's death has a devastating impact on Dr Crumb – however, instead of grieving, he retreats into the protection of pure rationality while disposing of the potentially very painful emotions that humanized him. He becomes head engineer in Wavey's place, which leads him down a road of cold, emotionless insanity until he has become completely inhuman. He reaches a turning point when he is informed halfway through London's completion that the city must move within weeks to avoid the onrushing army of nomads. In response, he concocts a 'rational' plan which involves not building most of the housing that had been planned on this new city and only taking the most 'useful' people on board London, leaving the others to die. Even when Fever returns relatively unharmed from the North, he has become so cold that he cannot love her and considers leaving her behind when he sees that she has abandoned rationality for love.

== Characters ==
As with the Mortal Engines Quartet, a number of the people in the books are named after places in Devon, where Reeve lives, including Chudleigh, Tamerton Foliot and the River Plym. In the quartet, Miss Plym and Chudleigh Pomeroy are both in the Guild of Historians, and Tamarton Foliot is an "Alternative" historian. Both Shrike and Smew are named after birds, and Pennyroyal is named after a flower. Many of the characters are named after ancient (in the context of the books) brands: Windolene Pye, Daz Gravy, Nutella Eisberg, Napster Varley, and Nabisco Shkin for example. Friends of Philip Reeve are also occasionally mentioned in the books as characters; for instance 'Poskitt' is included as a god, clearly referring to Kjartan Poskitt, a friend and the author of books that Reeve has illustrated in the past.

- Fever Crumb – The main protagonist of the series and child of Wavey Godshawk (the last of the human hybrid 'Scriven race') and engineer Dr. Gideon Crumb, the latter of which raised her amongst the London Engineers. She is portrayed as highly intelligent yet socially inept, and driven by rationality to a near zealous extent. As the series progresses however, her interactions with other cultures and societies outside of London lead her to become more open with her emotions. Fever is also plagued with seemingly random visions of her dead grandfather, Auric Godshawk, the former Scriven ruler of London. It is later revealed that the visions are caused by Stalker nanomachines that were implanted in her brain by Auric to preserve his memories. Physically, Fever is described as being shaven-headed with subtle Scriven features and heterochromia eyes. After the first book in the series, she decides to grow her fair coloured hair longer, scraping it backwards into a tight bun. She is bisexual, and falls in love with Arlo Thursday in A Web of Air, but later forms a romantic relationship with Cluny Morvish in Scrivener's Moon and the two eventually settle into a new life with each other.
- Auric Godshawk – Before the events of Fever Crumb Auric Godshawk was the last Scriven ruler of London before the Skinner's Guild staged a coup and murdered him and the rest of his kind. He was an ambitious man driven by science, and his fascination with advanced pre-war technology led him to conceive the idea of traction cities. Even with his murder at the hands of the Skinners, his daughter, Wavey Godshawk, continued to develop the traction city concept with the aid of northern nomad, Nicola Quercus. Many of the events in the series revolve around Auric's legacy and the impact it has on Fever's life.
- Wavey Godshawk – Fever Crumb's mother and the last known Scriven alive. She was the daughter of Auric Godshawk, and lived a wealthy lifestyle until an anti-Scriven uprising resulted in the genocide of her race and forced her to flee London. She would return to the city years later with her father's research, and the assistance and funding of Nicola Quercus, to continue developing the idea of a mobile traction city.
- Gideon Crumb – Fever Crumb's father, and a prominent member of the London Engineers. Before the genocide of the Scriven, Gideon worked as Auric Godshawk's apprentice. Despite his rational and logic driven personality, Gideon fell deeply in love with Auric's daughter, Wavey, and the two of them conceived Fever. After the uprising, Wavey went missing and Gideon raised his daughter amongst the engineers, while concealing the true nature of her identity from everyone including Fever herself.
- Arlo Thursday – A young inventor and the only survivor of a tsunami that killed his entire family on their own island. Arlo remained on the island for several months with only the company of a local flock of mutated birds, known as Angels. He was eventually rescued and taken to the nearby harbour city of Mayda, built inside an old crater located off the coast of Portugal. From there he was apprenticed to a shipwright named Blaizey, who was also the business rival of Arlo's father, before the great wave. His one true goal in life is to build a machine capable of flight, much to the bemusement of the citizens of Mayda. He is introduced in A Web of Air.
- Kit Solent/Shrike – Featured heavily in the original Mortal Engines Quartet as the infamous stalker, Shrike. Before his transformation, Solent was an archaeologist living in London and a caring father of two children. He takes on Fever Crumb as his apprentice in the hope that she can help him uncover the secrets of a mysterious locked door, deep in the catacombs beneath the city.
- Charley Shallow – A conflicted and morally ambiguous young boy who originally worked as an apprentice to Bagman Creech, an old Skinner. He is later taken into the Guild of Engineers and works as an apprentice for Gideon Crumb. While Charley is portrayed as being meek and easily manipulated early in the series, by Scrivener's Moon he is shown to be much more confident and ambitious, and even begins to manipulate others for his own needs. He shows bouts of both heroism and villainy, but often chooses the easier and more self-serving path. Charley is introduced in Fever Crumb.
- Cluny Morvish – The daughter of a minor nobleman in the nomadic Arkangelsk Empire. She is constantly troubled by visions of London becoming an all-devouring mobile city. While her dreams are interpreted by technomancer Nintendo Tharp as a warning from "the Ancestors", it is later revealed that Cluny was a victim of the same experiments conducted by Auric Godshawk on Fever. Under Tharp's strict tutelage Cluny becomes a prophet, a role that soon promotes a campaign against London aided by the warring empires of the north. She develops an intimate and romantic relationship with Fever. Cluny is introduced in Scrivener's Moon.
- Nicola Quercus – A northerner and land admiral of a nomadic organization known as The Movement. He is a pioneering ruler who assists Wavey Godshawk in the development of the first Traction City. In the Mortal Engines Quartet he is widely considered to be the founder and mind behind the concept of Municipal Darwinism and the traction cities, while in fact the idea was originally conceived by Auric Godshawk.
