= Murderous Maths =

Series of books

- The Guaranteed to Bend Your Brain cover
- Author: Kjartan Poskitt
- Illustrator: Philip Reeve; Ian Baker; Rob Davis; Daniel Postgate
- Language: English
- Subject: Mathematics
- Genre: Children's; mathematics
- Publisher: Scholastic
- Publication date: 1997 – present
- Publication place: United Kingdom

Murderous Maths is a series of British educational books by author Kjartan Poskitt. Most of the books in the series are illustrated by illustrator Philip Reeve, with the exception of "The Secret Life of Codes", which is illustrated by Ian Baker, "Awesome Arithmetricks" illustrated by Daniel Postgate and Rob Davis, and "The Murderous Maths of Everything", also illustrated by Rob Davis.

The Murderous Maths books have been published in over 25 countries. The books, which are aimed at children aged 8 and above, teach maths, spanning from basic arithmetic to relatively complex concepts such as the quadratic formula and trigonometry. The books are written in an informal similar style to the Horrible Histories, Horrible Science and Horrible Geography series, involving evil geniuses, gangsters, and a generally comedic tone.

== Development ==
The first two books of the series were originally part of "The Knowledge" (now "Totally") series, itself a spin-off of Horrible Histories. However, these books were eventually redesigned and they, as well as the rest of the titles in the series, now use the Murderous Maths banner. According to Poskitt, "these books have even found their way into schools and proved to be a boost to GCSE studies". The books are also available in foreign editions, including: German, Spanish, Polish, Czech, Greek, Dutch, Norwegian, Turkish, Croatian, Italian, Lithuanian, Korean, Danish, Hungarian, Finnish, Thai and Portuguese (Latin America). In 2009, the books were redesigned again, changing the cover art style and the titles of most of the books in the series.

Poskitt's goal, according to the Murderous Maths website, is to write books that are "something funny to read", have "good amusing illustrations", include "tricks", and "explaining the maths involved as clearly as possible". He adds that although he doesn't "work to any government imposed curriculum or any stage achievement levels", he has "been delighted to receive many messages of support and thanks from parents and teachers in the UK, the United States and elsewhere".

== Titles ==
The following are the thirteen books that are available in the series.

- Guaranteed to Bend Your Brain (previously Murderous Maths) (1997), ISBN 0-439-01156-6 - (addition, subtraction, multiplication, division, percentages, powers, tessellation, Roman numerals, the development of the "10" and the place system, shortcomings of calculators, prime numbers, time - how the year and day got divided, digital/analogue clocks, angles, introduction to real Mathematicians, magic squares, mental arithmetic, card trick with algebra explanation, rounding and symmetry.)
- Guaranteed to Mash your Mind (previously More Murderous Maths) (1998), ISBN 0-439-01153-1 (the monomino, domino, tromino, tetromino, pentomino, hexomino and heptomino, length area and volume, dimensions, measuring areas and volumes, basic rectangle and triangle formulas, speed, conversion of units, Möbius strip, Pythagoras, right-angled triangles, irrational numbers, pi, area and perimeter, bisecting angles, triangular numbers, topology networks, magic squares.)
- Awesome Arithmetricks (previously The Essential Arithmetricks: How to + - × ÷) (1998), ISBN 0-439-01157-4 - (counting, odd even and negative numbers, signs of maths, place value and rounding off, manipulating equations, + - x ÷ %, long division, times tables, estimation, decimal signs, QED.)
- The Mean & Vulgar Bits (previously The Mean & Vulgar Bits: Fractions and Averages) (2000), ISBN 0-439-01270-8 (fractions, converting improper and mixed fractions, adding subtracting multiplying and dividing fractions, primes and prime factors, reducing fractions, highest common factor and lowest common denominators, Egyptian fractions, comparing fractions, cancelling out fractions, converting fractions to decimals, decimal place system, percentages: increase and decrease, averages: mean mode and median.)
- Desperate Measures (previously Desperate Measures: Length, Area and Volume) (2000), ISBN 0-439-01370-4 (measuring lines: units and accuracy, old measuring systems, the development of metric, the SI system and powers of ten, shapes, measuring areas and area formulas, weight, angles, measuring volume, Archimedes Principle, density, time and how the modern calendar developed.)
- Do You Feel Lucky? (previously Do You Feel Lucky: The Secrets of Probability) (2001), ISBN 0-439-99607-4 (chance, tree diagrams, mutually exclusive and independent chances, Pascal's Triangle, permutations and combinations, sampling.)
- Savage Shapes (previously Vicious Circles and Other Savage Shapes) (2002), ISBN 0-439-99747-X (signs in geometric diagrams, Loci, constructions: perpendicular bisectors; dropping perpendiculars; bisecting angles, triangles: similar; congruent; equal areas, polygons: regular; irregular; angle sizes and construction, tessellations and Penrose Tiles, origami, circles: chord; tangent; angle theorems, regular solids, Euler's formula, ellipses, Geometric proof of Pythagoras' Theorem.)
- The Key To The Universe (previously Numbers: The Key To The Universe) (2002), ISBN 0-439-98116-6 (phi, Fibonacci Series, Golden Ratio, properties of Square, Triangle, Cube, Centred Hexagon and Tetrahedral numbers, "difference of two squares", number superstitions, prime numbers, Mersenne primes, tests to see if a number will divide by anything from 2-13 and 19, finger multiplication, binary, octal, and hexadecimal, perfect numbers, tricks of the nine times table, irrational transcendental and imaginary numbers, infinity.)
- The Phantom X (previously The Phantom X: Algebra) (2003), ISBN 0-439-97729-0 (variables, elementary algebra, brackets, factorising, expanding, and simplifying expressions, solving quadratics and the quadratic formula, "Think of a number" tricks, difference of two squares, coefficients of (a-b)n, linear graphs: co-ordinates; gradients; y intercept, non-linear function graphs including parabolas, simultaneous equations: substitution and elimination, dividing by zero!.)
- The Fiendish Angletron (previously The Fiendish Angletron: Trigonometry) (2004), ISBN 0-439-96859-3 (scales and ratios in maps and diagrams, protractor and compass, SIN, COS and TAN ratios in right angled triangles, trig on a calculator; normal and inverse, sine and cosine formulas for non-right-angled triangles, triangulation, parallax angles and parsecs, sin/cos/tan relationships, sin wave, bearings.)
- The Perfect Sausages (previously The Perfect Sausage and other Fundamental Formulas) (2005), ISBN 0-439-95901-2 (areas and volumes, ellipsoids and toruses, number formulas (e.g. triangle, hexagonal), speed, acceleration, stopping time, distance, force, gravity, projectiles, Money: percentages; simple and compound interest, permutations and combinations.)
- The 5ecret L1fe of Code5 (previously Codes: How to Make Them and Break Them) (2007), ISBN 978-1-4071-0715-8 (patterns, logic and deduction, prime numbers, high powers, modular arithmetic.)
- Easy Questions, Evil Answers (2010), ISBN 1-407-11451-4 (formulas, working out square roots by hand, π, Pythagoras, paradoxes, problem solving, metric prefixes, large numbers, vectors.)

Related puzzle books have been published also:

- Professor Fiendish's Book of Diabolical Brain-benders (2002), ISBN 0-439-98226-X (mazes, logic, coin problems, number crosswords, shape cutting/rearranging, number squares.)
- Professor Fiendish's Book of Brain-benders (a smaller version of the above) (same as above)
- Sudoku: 100 Fun Number Puzzles (2005), ISBN 0-439-84570-X
- Kakuro and Other Fiendish Number Puzzles (2006), ISBN 0-439-95164-X

One title that covers many different areas of mathematics has also been released:

- The Most Epic Book of Maths Ever (previously The Murderous Maths of Everything) (2010), ISBN 1-407-10367-9 (prime numbers, Sieve of Eratosthenes, Pythagoras' Theorem, triangular numbers, square numbers, the International Date Line, geometry, geometric constructions, topology, Möbius strips, curves (conic sections and cycloids Golomb Rulers, four-dimensional "Tic Tac Toe", The Golden Ratio, Fibonacci sequence, Logarithmic spirals, musical ratios, Theorems (including Ham sandwich theorem and Fixed point theorem), probability (cards, dice, cluedo etc.), Pascal's Triangle, Sierpinski Triangle, chess board, light years, size and distance of moon and planets, orbit, size of stars, shape of galaxy.)

Kjartan has also written a book entitled Everyday Maths for Grown-Ups (2011).

== Reviews ==
A recommendation of the series by Scientific American includes a quote from a Stanford engineer named Stacy F. Bennet, who described the series as "very humorous and engaging introductions to such topics as algebra, geometry and probability". On 22 November 1997, that same publication said of the series, "Have a look at Murderous Maths by Kjartan Poskitt. It is a truly addictive reading book, and was leapt on and devoured by my children. The book is full of awful jokes, fascinating facts, real murders and yes, the maths is good too. This is a brilliant book."

The Primary Times released a review of Professor Fiendish's Book of Diabolical Brain-benders on November 25, 2002, describing the title as "intriguing, fun to do, and not at all dry", and adding "I warn you, once you start, you'll be 'hooked'!". The Times Educational Supplement also published a review on the book on December 6, 2002, describing the title as being "action-packed" and reasoning that "behind the non-stop fun, serious mathematical principles are being investigated".

Kjartan did a presentation for 350 kids and 10 teachers at Wolfreton School, Hull in June 2004. Reporter Linda Blackbourne described it as a "stand-up maths routine [that] has children - and teachers - in fits of laughter". Carousel issue 16 (the guide to children's books) commented on the event: "...he possesses a prodigious gift of the (Yorkshire) gab, appears to be incapable of not enjoying himself, and plays his audience with the finesse of a maestro. Maths will never seem the same again".

The Times Educational Supplement described Murderous Maths as "A stand-up maths routine has children and teachers in fits of laughter... maths has never been so much fun". The Western Gazette said: "It is not often that you see a grown maths teacher cry with laughter...", while The Worthing Gazette said: "The kids went wild, they absolutely loved it...". The Stockton Evening Gazette said: "Headteacher Barry Winter said it was a stroke of genius inviting the quick-witted author to open the resource centre". The GCSE book in the Guardian said: "Those who have experienced Poskitt "live" will recognise his commitment to getting readers involved with the learning process" (Nov 6th 2001), and The Press (York) described it as "...charismatic..."

A review by science writer Brian Clegg described his views on Murderous Maths: Desperate Measures:

It's the usual clever mix of light historical context − mostly ancient from Israelites and Archimedes to the Romans − and real insights into fascinating aspects of something that sits nicely between maths and practical science. There's plenty to keep the reader and interested, and even adults perusing it will have one or two surprises along the way. Because it is very much applied maths, there is also a lot more opportunity to have fun with practical things to try out than has been the case with some of the Murderous Maths series. All in all this is a great addition to the fold.

== Spin-offs ==
- Killer Puzzles (Written by Kjartan Poskitt)
- The Urgum The Axeman series (by Kjartan Poskitt and illustrated by Philip Reeve)

== See also ==
- Horrible Histories
- Horrible Science
