= Starcross (novel) =

2007 middle grade novel by Philip Reeve

- Author: Philip Reeve
- Illustrator: David Wyatt
- Language: English
- Series: Larklight
- Genre: Steampunk
- Publisher: Bloomsbury Publishing
- Publication date: October 2007
- Publication place: United Kingdom
- Media type: Print (Hardback & Paperback)
- Pages: 400
- ISBN: 0-7475-8913-5
- OCLC: 155683535
- Preceded by: Larklight
- Followed by: Mothstorm

Starcross, or the Coming of the Moobs! or Our Adventures in the Fourth Dimension! is a middle grade novel by Philip Reeve, released in October 2007. Illustrated by David Wyatt, it is the second book in the Larklight trilogy, sequel to the 2006 novel Larklight.

== Plot summary ==
Protagonist Arthur ("Art") Mumby and his older sister Myrtle are invited to the Starcross hotel on a small and periodically barren asteroid. There, Arthur's mother Emily suspects that Starcross is built on a piece of Mars which routinely slips through a hole in the fabric of time, and Myrtle then discovers that Sir Richard Burton and his Martian wife Ulla have been changed into trees. Jack Havock, now a British secret agent, appears on the scene disguised as an Indian prince.

In the following night they are attacked by the Moobs, a species with the ability to shapeshift into forms of inanimate objects, which currently resemble animated black top hats, which take control of Jack's crew and other guests, including Emily. Myrtle and Jack escape, but become lost in the deserts of prehistoric Mars. There, they encounter Delphine, one of the guests, a French secret agent determined to find her grandfather's wrecked ship and create an American-style republic in his name. At the wreck, they discover that Delphine's grandfather was killed by Moobs, and later learn that the Moobs are native to a time period near the end of the universe, and that they live chiefly by feeding on other species' thoughts and dreams.

A well-intentioned Moob helps Jack win Delphine's soldiers to his side, and they return to Starcross. There, the Moobs load Jack's ship with their comrades and plan to take control of the local societies. Art frees Jack's crew from their influence, and they return to Starcross to discover that Arthur's mother, having sufficient memory to sate them, has subdued the Moobs. Starcross' owner Sir Launcelot Sprigg and Delphine attempt to overpower the others; but Arthur's mother changes them into babies (using her old Larklight engine with the ability to travel through time and space (removed from Larklight at the end of the previous novel)). The protagonists enter the future and inspire the Moobs with new thoughts, whereby they are stimulated to greater activity. Thereafter Myrtle, challenged by Jack, determines to study the cold fusion used in space travel; whereas Professor Ferny, a plant-like creature, promises to find a cure for Sir Richard and Ulla's transformation.

== Reception ==
Fantasy Book Review gave the book a 9.0 out of 10, saying "it is a joy to read", while praising the imagination of author Philip Reeve.

The Sunday Times called it “'Remarkable...Out of this world.'”

Philip Reeve is a well known fiction author most famously known for the creation of the Mortal Engines series.
