= A Web of Air =

2010 young-adult novel by Philip Reeve

- Author: Philip Reeve
- Language: English
- Series: Fever Crumb Series
- Genre: Steampunk
- Publisher: Scholastic Corporation
- Publication date: April 2010
- Publication place: United Kingdom
- Media type: Print (hardback)
- Pages: 285 pages
- Preceded by: Fever Crumb
- Followed by: Scrivener's Moon

A Web of Air is a young adult post-apocalyptic science fiction novel by British writer Philip Reeve. It is the second book in the Fever Crumb series, a prequel series to the Mortal Engines Quartet. It was published on 5 April 2010.

== Synopsis ==
The clever young engineer, Fever Crumb, is swept up in a race to build a flying machine. Her mysterious companion is a boy who talks to Angels. Powerful enemies will kill to possess their new technology-or to destroy it.

A Web of Air is the sequel to Fever Crumb, the story set centuries before Mortal Engines that tells how great cities begin to build giant engines to make their first predatory journeys across the wastelands. It is set in Mayda, a city established in an atomic bomb crater off of mainland Portugal.

== Reception ==
Kirkus Reviews called the book "Imaginative, inventive and exciting."
