= Scrivener's Moon =

2011 young-adult novel by Philip Reeve

- Author: Philip Reeve
- Language: English
- Series: Fever Crumb Series
- Genre: Steampunk
- Publisher: Scholastic Corporation
- Publication date: April 4th 2011
- Publication place: United Kingdom
- Media type: Print (Hardback)
- Pages: 352
- ISBN: 0545222192
- OCLC: 1034591167
- Preceded by: A Web of Air

Scrivener's Moon is the third and final book in the Fever Crumb series, the prequel series to the Mortal Engines Quartet. It was released on 4 April 2011.

== Background ==
The story picks up not long after the conclusion of A Web of Air and will once again follow the series' main character Fever Crumb, an ex London engineer.

One of Philip Reeve's blog posts shed some light on the series before its release. Crumb's true journey is set to begin, starting at the newly reconstructed city of London, which has become a fledgling Traction City.

The Arkangelsk return to the series in this book but will be shown in an entirely different light than their descendants who were prominent antagonists in the original Mortal Engines Quartet.

== Synopsis ==
In a future land once known as Britain, nomad tribes are preparing to fight a terrifying enemy - the first-ever mobile city. Before London can launch itself, young engineer Fever Crumb must journey to the wastelands of the North. She seeks the ancient birthplace of the Scriven mutants.

== Characters ==
- Fever Crumb
- Cluny Morvish
- Dr. Gideon Crumb
- Wavey Godshawk
- Charley Shallow
- Nikola Quercus (later Nicholas Quirke)
- Nintendo Tharp
- Borglum
- Gwen Natsworthy
- Shrike

== Reception ==
Kirkus Reviews called the book "Quiet and somber, but still deeply satisfying".

Thirst for Fantasy praised the book for "introducing some great new characters" in this "character-driven book". It also said any reader who appreciate Mortal Engines would appreciate Scrivener's Moon.
