= Kjartan Poskitt =

British author and TV presenter (born 1956)

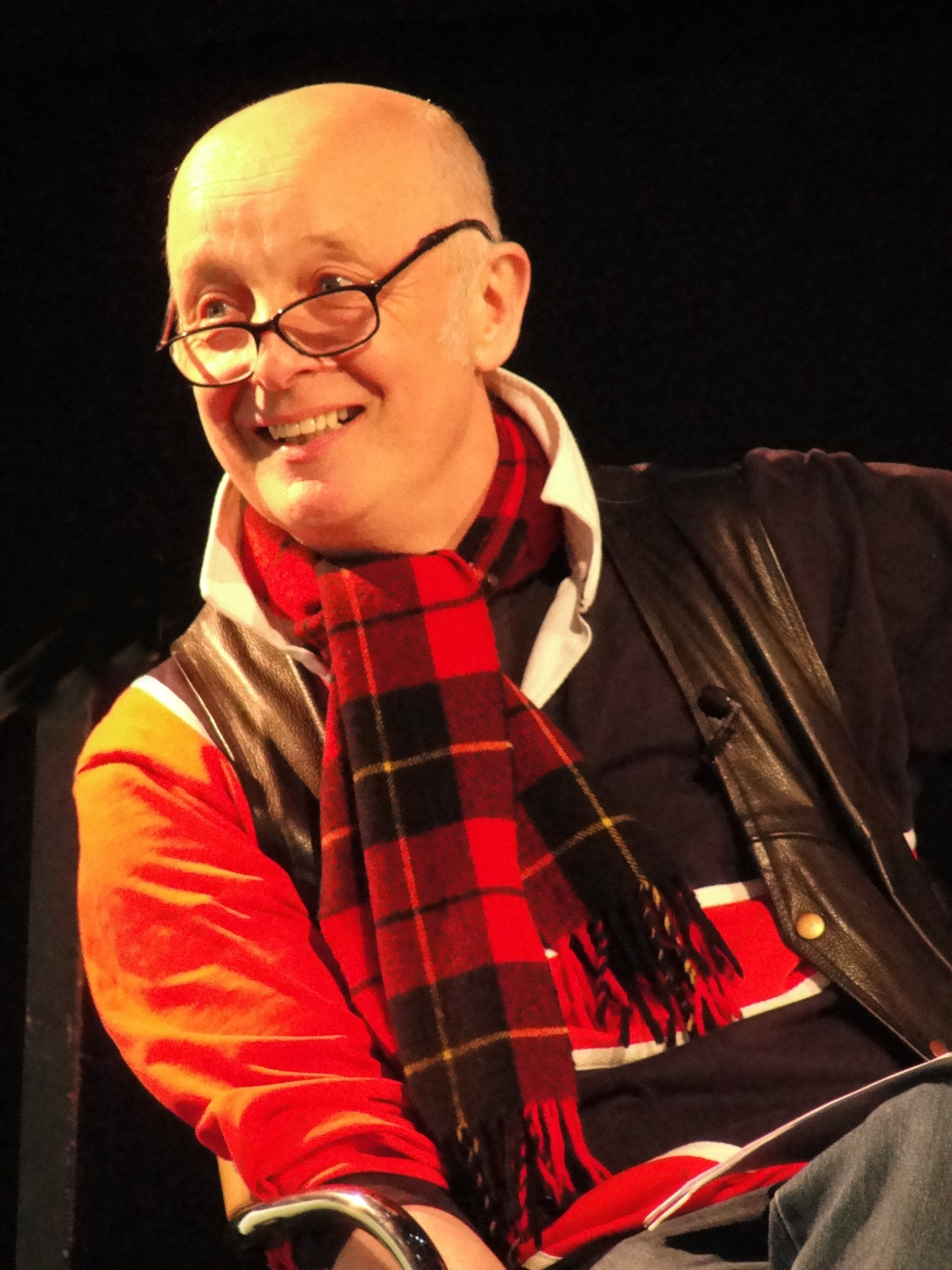
- Kjartan Poskitt in 2014
- Born: 15 May 1956 (age 70); York, England
- Education: Collingwood College, Durham
- Occupations: Writer and TV presenter
- Notable work: Murderous Maths
- Children: 4

Kjartan Poskitt (born 15 May 1956 in York) is an English writer and TV presenter who is best known for writing the Murderous Maths children's series of books.

== Early life and education ==
Poskitt was born in York, England, grew up in Selby, Yorkshire. He was educated at the Selby Abbey School, Terrington Hall, North Yorkshire, and Bootham School, York, before studying engineering at Collingwood College, Durham University.

He is married with four daughters.

== Career ==
Poskitt was a member of a comedy group while at Durham University, and toured with it to the US in 1979, playing the piano and singing, performing skits and doing a ventriloquist act with a dummy which wouldn't speak. He participated in the National Student Drama Festival from 1976 to 1980, and also performed solo at the Edinburgh Fringe Festival from 1979 to 1981. He was a member of the pop group Candlewick Green in the early 1980s.

He has written and directed a number of pantomimes performed by the National Student Theatre Company, including Jack and the Beanstalk (1979), The Sleeping Beauty (1980), Cinderella (1981), Jack and the Beanstalk (1983), as well as a nativity play, The Road to Bethlehem (1980), and a "musical ghost pantomime", Sammy's Magic Garden (1985). His published shows include the historical musical plays Henry The Tudor Dude (1995), Fawkes the Quiet Guy (1998) and Nell's Belles (2002).

Early children's television appearances included Swap Shop during its Edinburgh Festival broadcasts, and ITV Yorkshire's Behind the Bike Sheds.

== Writing ==
In addition to his science and maths books, which include books on Isaac Newton (Dead Famous: Isaac Newton and his Apple), and various galaxy puzzles, practical jokes and secret codes, Poskitt has written a book of magical tricks (Magic Tricks with Underpants, Scholastic 2004), a GCSE Maths support book and four Rosie and Jim annuals. In 2007, Poskitt published the first in a series of children's novels called Urgum the Axeman. Since then he has written the "Borgon the Axeboy" series and the award-winning "Agatha Parrot" series. In 2019 he wrote a picture book "The Runaway Pea" which won several awards and was chosen by Book Trust to be distributed to 750,000 school starters in the UK.

He also wrote the theme tune for the children's art program SMart, as well as the title theme and music for the first two series of Brum. He is also the creator of a logic puzzle, Kjarposko.

He has been a presenter for a number of (mostly BBC) educational children's TV shows.

== See also ==
- List of children's non-fiction writers
