= David Wyatt (artist) =

English artist

David Wyatt is an English commercial artist.

Born in Northampton, David Wyatt was adopted and raised in West Sussex. As a child, he learnt to play the piano; however, his interest in reading and drawing combined into a love of comics.

At 16, he attended art college in Reading, and obtained his first work doing the occasional page for British comic 2000 AD. He signed on for a further year at college, but left just two weeks later.

While having some menial jobs, he worked on his portfolio, practiced guitar and played in bands. He created the occasional cover commissions, but was just as keen to make a career in music. After an unsuccessful band tour of Scandinavia, he decided that the rock and roll lifestyle wasn't for him, and moved to Dartmoor to concentrate on illustration.

Wyatt has tried most media at some point (collage, acrylics, sculpture, thick paint, thin paint), but now mainly produce work on an Apple Mac. The Dartmoor landscape provides inspiration; otherwise his ideas come from everywhere - "watching a film, walking round Sydney Opera house, the dog pulling a stupid face; anything."

Wyatt has illustrated Peter Pan in Scarlet by Geraldine McCaughrean (Illustrated Edition, 2008) and Philip Reeve's Mortal Engines Quartet, Larklight trilogy and Fever Crumb series. He also illustrated The Hobbit 2017 edition.

He was the cover artist for the eight-volume fantasy school stories Children of the Red King by Jenny Nimmo (2002 to 2009). He has also worked on album covers (including Glass Hammer's The Middle-Earth Album), computer games, beer labels and stamps.

Wyatt lives in Devon, in a market town on Dartmoor. He is a keen lutist, cyclist and wanderer of the moors.
