= Peter Jackson's unrealized projects =

During his long career, New Zealand filmmaker Peter Jackson has worked on several projects which never progressed beyond the pre-production stage under his direction. Some of these projects fell in development hell, were officially canceled, were in development limbo or saw life under a different production team.

== 1980s ==
=== A Nightmare on Elm Street 6: The Dream Lover ===
In the late 1980s, Jackson submitted a screenplay to New Line Cinema he co-wrote with Danny Mulheron entitled A Nightmare on Elm Street 6: The Dream Lover. A separate script for a sixth film, Freddy's Dead: The Final Nightmare (1991), was made instead.

=== Bad Taste 2 ===
Following the release of his feature debut Bad Taste (1987), Jackson wrote the script for a potential sequel. The story involved an alien invasion of Wellington, as well as Santa Claus and a giant wētā. In 1992, Jackson stated that the temptation to make Bad Taste 2 was growing on him.

=== Warrior Season ===
While mulling over the possibilities of making a sequel to Bad Taste, Jackson was also co-writing a script called Warrior Season with Costa Botes. Inspired by his love of Jackie Chan films such as Project A (1983) and Police Story (1985), the project was described as a kung-fu western set during the New Zealand gold rush of the 1870s. Little else is known, other than that Timothy Dalton was eyed to play the villain in the film.

== 1990s ==
=== The Black Max ===
Presumably in the early 1990s, Jackson intended to direct a film based on the comic strip character Black Max.

=== Blubberhead ===
In 1992, Jackson was working on a stop motion fantasy epic called Blubberhead, co-written Danny Mulheron. It was described as the "missing link" between Jackson's early work and his Lord of the Rings trilogy. He hired Randall William Cook to do the effects for the film, but it was ultimately never made.

=== Johnny Zombie ===
Also in 1992, Jackson was offered an opportunity to direct the horror comedy Johnny Zombie. He turned it down, and the film was instead produced under the title My Boyfriend's Back (1993).

=== Planet of the Apes reboot ===
Before turning their attention to Heavenly Creatures (1994), Jackson and Fran Walsh pitched a Planet of the Apes film to 20th Century Fox about the ape race going through a Renaissance. Plotlines included the ape government becoming concerned about new artwork, the humans leading a revolt against the apes, and the liberal apes sheltering a half-human/half-ape from the gorillas. Roddy McDowall agreed to play a Leonardo da Vinci-inspired character. However, the executive Jackson spoke to was not a fan of the series and turned the proposal down.

=== Creature from the Black Lagoon remake ===
In 1995, Jackson was offered by Universal Pictures to direct a remake of Creature from the Black Lagoon (1954). He passed on the chance, and a decade later made King Kong (2005) for the studio instead.

=== A Day with Wilbur Robinson ===
In 1995, Jackson was offered by author William Joyce to direct a live action adaptation of his book, A Day with Wilbur Robinson. He turned it down, and the film became Meet The Robinsons, which was animated instead of live-action.

=== Invasion of Privacy ===
Jackson was sent the script for the drama/thriller titled Invasion of Privacy from a German producer. The story follows a pregnant woman who is held hostage by her ex-boyfriend. However, Jackson turned down the offer to direct.

=== Jean Batten ===
Jackson at one point optioned the film rights for the biography of the famous New Zealand aviator, Jean Batten: The Garbo of the Skies.

=== The World Is Not Enough ===
Jackson was offered to direct the James Bond film The World Is Not Enough (1999), but Barbara Broccoli lost interest after a screening of his film The Frighteners (1996).

=== The True Story of John/Joan ===
In 1999, it was reported in Variety that among the projects in development at Good Machine was The True Story of John/Joan, set to be directed by Jackson from a script by Fran Walsh. It was adapted from John Colapinto's Rolling Stone story of the same name about Canadian man David Reimer whose childhood was spent living as a girl after a botched circumcision as a baby. Colapinto later wrote a book-length account on Reimer, As Nature Made Him.

== 2000s ==
=== Halo: Chronicles video game ===
Jackson was set to make games with Microsoft Game Studios, a collaboration announced on 27 September 2006, at X06. Specifically, Jackson and Microsoft were teaming together to form a new studio called Wingnut Interactive. In collaboration with Bungie, he was to co-write, co-design and co-produce a new game taking place in the Halo universe – tentatively called Halo: Chronicles. On 27 July 2009, in an interview about his new movie (as producer) District 9, he announced that Halo: Chronicles had been cancelled, while Microsoft confirmed that the game is "on hold". In July 2009 Jackson's game studio Wingnut Interactive were said to be at work on original intellectual property.

=== Temeraire ===
In 2006, The Hollywood Reporter announced that Jackson optioned the film rights to Naomi Novik's Temeraire series. "[It's] a terrific meld of two genres that I particularly love—fantasy and historical epic," Jackson said at the time. In a 2009 interview with IGN, Jackson stated that he was considering adapting the novels in the form of a miniseries instead. "With six books, I really don't like the idea of making a big-budget movie of the first book and it not doing well at the box office and suddenly that's the end of the series."

== 2010s ==
=== Untitled New Zealand-set film ===
While promoting The Hobbit: The Battle of the Five Armies (2014), Jackson revealed to several news publications that before embarking on directing the Adventures of Tintin sequel, he wanted to return to his roots and make a new film set in New Zealand first. He stated that he and Fran Walsh were in the process of adapting several true stories about their native country that would be "similar in tone and scope" to Heavenly Creatures (1994). "We really want to do something now that's connected with where we live rather than something that's a Hollywood thing," said Jackson. No further details were disclosed. In 2016, Steven Spielberg revealed that a "secret" new film directed by Jackson was in development at Amblin Entertainment.

== 2020s ==
=== Untitled projects ===
In 2025, Jackson told Screen Rant that he was not retired from filmmaking, and currently in the process of developing and writing three new screenplays.
