= Carolynne Cunningham =

Australian film producer and assistant director

- Born: Carolynne Cunningham; 25 July 1964 (age 62); Sydney, New South Wales, Australia
- Occupations: Producer, assistant director
- Years active: 1978–present

Carolynne Cunningham is an Australian film producer and assistant director most known for her collaborations with director Peter Jackson, producing such films as King Kong (2005), District 9, The Lovely Bones (both 2009), and The Hobbit film series (2012–2014). She also served as assistant director on such notable films as Shine (1996), Pitch Black (2000), Peter Pan (2003), King Kong, The Lovely Bones, and all three entries in The Lord of the Rings trilogy (2001, 2002, and 2003).

== Filmography ==
=== Producer ===
Year	Title	Notes
2005	King Kong	Empire Award for Best Film; San Diego Film Critics Society Award for Best Film; Nominated — Broadcast Film Critics Association Award for Best Film; Nominated — Chicago Film Critics Association Award for Best Film; Nominated — London Film Critics Circle Award for Film of the Year; Nominated — MTV Movie Award for Best Movie; Nominated — Saturn Award for Best Fantasy Film
2008	Crossing the Line	Short film
2009	District 9	Kansas City Film Critics Circle Award for Best Science Fiction, Fantasy or Horror Film; Saturn Award for Best International Film; Nominated — Academy Award for Best Picture; Nominated — Broadcast Film Critics Association Award for Best Action Film; Nominated — Empire Award for Best Film; Nominated — Empire Award for Best Sci-Fi/Fantasy
2009	The Lovely Bones	Nominated — Saturn Award for Best Fantasy Film
2011	The Adventures of Tintin: The Secret of the Unicorn	Co-producer
2012	The Hobbit: An Unexpected Journey	Empire Award for Best Sci-Fi/Fantasy
2013	The Hobbit: The Desolation of Smaug	Empire Award for Best Sci-Fi/Fantasy
2014	The Hobbit: The Battle of the Five Armies	Nominated — Empire Award for Best Sci-Fi/Fantasy
