= Crossing the Line (2008 film) =

- Directed by: Peter Jackson
- Written by: Peter Jackson
- Produced by: Carolynne Cunningham; Jim Jannard; Fran Walsh
- Starring: Tom Hobbs; Calum Gittins
- Edited by: Jabez Olssen
- Music by: James Newton Howard
- Production company: Red Digital Cinema
- Distributed by: WingNut Films; Weta Limited
- Release date: April 2008

Crossing the Line is a 2008 war short film written and directed by Peter Jackson set in World War I. It is the first film made with the Red One camera. The film has no dialogue apart from the incidental speech of background characters. Neill Blomkamp serves as additional director.

In 2007, the Red Digital Cinema Camera Company, manufacturers of the Red One, a new digital motion-picture camera, offered Jackson the chance to test their prototype cameras and record some sample footage for the 2007 NAB convention. Jackson instead proposed that he should use the testing time to shoot a short film. In March 2007, staff from Red flew to New Zealand with two of their prototype cameras, nicknamed "Boris" and "Natasha". The film was shot over two days, 30 and 31 March, in Masterton. The short film was shown two weeks later at NAB where it attracted large crowds and long lines.

== Plot ==
The film centres on two young soldiers in World War I who are about to go into battle. Both have comforting reminders of home. One of the men is an infantryman who clutches a photograph of his lover. The other a pilot who carefully tucks a teddy bear into a safe place in the cockpit of his biplane.

The pilot takes off, headed for the airspace above the trenches where the other soldier waits for the whistle signalling an attack. The whistle sounds and the soldier tucks his photograph into his pocket and charges forward across the battlefield and dives into a foxhole. When he gets there he is horrified to discover he has dropped his photograph. He spots it lying on the battlefield nearby and begins crawling over to retrieve it. However every time he gets close the wind blows it further away.

Meanwhile, above him, the pilot is now involved in a dogfight with a German triplane while simultaneously struggling to keep control of his bear which keeps coming loose from its safe place in his cockpit. Eventually the bear falls out of his cockpit and becomes caught on the tail section of his plane.

Below on the ground, the infantryman has caught up with his photograph, but he doesn't realise he has wandered into the sights of a German sniper. Just as the sniper is about to fire, the view through his rifle scope is blocked by an object. It is the pilot's bear, which has fallen from the plane. In the time it takes the sniper to knock the bear away, the infantryman has disappeared. In his sights, in the place where the infantryman formerly stood, there is now a tank whose gun is aimed directly at him. The tank fires and the sniper is killed.
