= Jim Booth =

New Zealand film producer (1945–1994)

- Born: 7 February 1945; Auckland, New Zealand
- Died: 4 January 1994 (aged 48); Wellington, New Zealand
- Occupations: Film producer, actor
- Years active: 1989–1994

Jim Booth (7 February 1945 – 4 January 1994) was a New Zealand film producer and actor, known for producing early films from Peter Jackson, including Meet the Feebles (1989) and Braindead (1992).

Booth died of cancer on 4 January 1994, at the age of 48.

== Filmography ==
Year	Title	Producer	Actor	Notes
1989	Meet the Feebles	Yes		
1992	Braindead	Yes	Yes	Role: Lionel's father
1992	Valley of the Stereos	Yes		Executive producer Short film
1994	Heavenly Creatures	Yes		Posthumous credit
1996	Jack Brown Genius	Yes		Development producer Posthumous credit
