= The Palace of the King of the Birds =

Instrumental by the Beatles
- Recorded: 6, 7 and 9 January 1969 and then again in 1978
- Studio: Twickenham Film Studios
- Length: various
- Songwriter: Lennon–McCartney

"The Palace of the King of the Birds", also known as "The Castle of the King of the Birds", is a name given to an instrumental by the English rock band the Beatles. It was written by Paul McCartney and was originally recorded by the band during the Let It Be album sessions in three takes between 6 and 9 January, 1969, at Twickenham Film Studios. The recordings vary in length—the 6 January session is fourteen minutes one second long and turned into a loose jam, and was recorded with the demo of "Carry That Weight". The instrumental was used as the end-credits music for the first episode of the Disney+ documentary The Beatles: Get Back, in which it also makes a brief appearance earlier in the episode, where it was credited to Lennon/McCartney/Harrison/Starkey.

The track was later forgotten, until McCartney recorded a still unreleased version, in his solo recordings, named "The Castle of the King of the Birds"; this version was recorded for the unreleased album Rupert the Bear, sometime in 1978, with Wings with a duration of 1:42.

== Personnel for the January 9 version ==
- Paul McCartney – Hammond organ
- John Lennon – rhythm guitar
- George Harrison – lead guitar
- Ringo Starr – drums

== Reception ==
Music critic Richie Unterberger noted McCartney's "particularly elegiac" organ, and the "flowing, bluesy guitar lines", saying it was about as close as the band ever came to progressive rock jamming - "highly uncharacteristic territory for the group to be wandering into, but interesting precisely for that reason." New York Magazine's Vulture website called each musical element "beautifully considered," saying "it's all very turn-off-your-mind-relax-and-float-downstream."
