= The Lovely Bones (film) =

2009 film by Peter Jackson

- Theatrical release poster
- Directed by: Peter Jackson
- Screenplay by: Fran Walsh; Philippa Boyens; Peter Jackson
- Based on: The Lovely Bones by Alice Sebold
- Produced by: Carolynne Cunningham; Fran Walsh; Peter Jackson; Aimee Peyronnet
- Starring: Mark Wahlberg; Rachel Weisz; Susan Sarandon; Stanley Tucci; Michael Imperioli; Saoirse Ronan
- Cinematography: Andrew Lesnie
- Edited by: Jabez Olssen
- Music by: Brian Eno
- Production companies: DreamWorks Pictures; Film4 Productions; Amblin Entertainment; WingNut Films
- Distributed by: Paramount Pictures
- Release dates: November 24, 2009 (Royal Film Performance); December 11, 2009 (United States: limited); December 26, 2009 (New Zealand); January 15, 2010 (United States: wide); January 29, 2010 (United Kingdom)
- Running time: 135 minutes
- Countries: United States; United Kingdom; New Zealand
- Language: English
- Budget: $65 million
- Box office: $93.6 million

The Lovely Bones is a 2009 supernatural drama film directed by Peter Jackson and written by Jackson, Fran Walsh and Philippa Boyens, based on the 2002 novel by Alice Sebold. It stars Mark Wahlberg, Rachel Weisz, Susan Sarandon, Stanley Tucci, Michael Imperioli, and Saoirse Ronan. Ronan plays a teenager who watches her family from heaven after she is murdered.

A co-production between the United States, the United Kingdom, and New Zealand, The Lovely Bones was produced by Carolynne Cunningham, Walsh, Jackson, and Aimee Peyronnet, with Steven Spielberg, Tessa Ross, Ken Kamins, and James Wilson as executive producers. Principal photography began in October 2007 in New Zealand and Pennsylvania. The score was composed by Brian Eno.

The Lovely Bones premiered in London on November 24, 2009, and was released in New Zealand on December 26, 2009 and in the United States on January 15, 2010. It received mixed reviews; while the visual effects, the direction, and the performances of Ronan and Tucci were praised, its story and message were criticized. At the world box office, The Lovely Bones grossed $93.6 million on a $65 million production budget. Tucci was nominated for Best Supporting Actor at the Academy Awards, the Golden Globes and the BAFTAs, and Ronan was nominated for a BAFTA for Best Actress.

== Plot ==
In 1973, 14-year-old Susie Salmon dreams of becoming a photographer. One day, Ray, a boy she has a crush on, asks her out. As Susie walks home through a cornfield, she runs into her neighbor, George Harvey, who coaxes her into an underground "kid's hideout" he has built. Inside, Susie grows uncomfortable and attempts to leave; Harvey grabs her and the scene fades until she is seen rushing past her alarmed classmate Ruth Connors, fleeing Harvey's den.

When Susie fails to return home from school, her father, Jack, searches for her, while her mother, Abigail, waits for the police. In town, Susie sees Jack, who does not respond to her when she calls. Susie runs home to find Harvey soaking in a bathtub. After seeing the bloody bathroom and her bracelet hanging on the sink faucet, Susie realizes she never actually escaped the hideout and Harvey murdered her. She is pulled into the "In-Between", which is neither Heaven nor Earth. From there, Susie watches over her family. Holly, a friend she makes, urges her to let go but she resists.

Jack believes Susie was murdered by someone she knew. He researches neighbors and eventually suspects Harvey is the killer. Detective Fenerman is unable to find proof, as Harvey has carefully concealed the evidence. Susie's sister, Lindsey, agrees with Jack's suspicions, but their casework takes a toll on Abigail. Abigail's alcoholic mother, Lynn, moves into the house. Feeling alienated from her husband, Abigail goes to California.

Susie, in her afterlife, learns that Harvey, who has targeted Lindsey as his next victim, has murdered six other girls, including Holly. Harvey has stuffed Susie's body into a large safe in his basement.

One night, Jack, carrying a baseball bat, trails Harvey into the cornfield. However, Jack accidentally stumbles across a teen couple named Clarissa and Brian. Brian, thinking they will be assaulted, bludgeons Jack nearly to death while Clarissa begs him to stop, and Harvey watches nearby. As Jack recuperates, Lindsey breaks into Harvey's house looking for evidence that he killed Susie. Upstairs, she finds a notebook containing a sketch of the underground den, a lock of Susie's hair, and news articles about Susie's disappearance.

Harvey returns and almost catches Lindsey, but she escapes and rushes home to discover that her mother has returned. She gives the notebook to her grandmother, who contacts the police. Harvey has already fled his home – taking the safe containing Susie's body with him.

Susie's afterlife begins expanding into a larger heaven, and she is greeted by Harvey's other victims. She resists Holly's urging her to enter Heaven along with the others, claiming she has one final thing to do. Meanwhile, Susie's classmates Ruth and Ray are present when Harvey drives up to dispose of the safe at a sinkhole dump site on the Connors' property. Susie returns to Earth and enters Ruth's body, causing Ruth to faint. Ray rushes to Ruth's aid only to realize she has become Susie. They kiss, completing Susie's last wish, and she returns to Heaven. Meanwhile, Harvey dumps the safe in the sinkhole, leaving it to disappear in the muddy water as he drives away.

Later, Harvey meets a young woman outside a diner and offers her a ride, but instead is insulted when she tells him to “piss off”. As she leaves him, an icicle drops on his shoulder and a piece gets inside the collar of his jacket. While attempting to get the ice out of his jacket, he slips backwards on the icy ground and plummets off the side of a steep cliff to his death.

Time passes, and Susie sees that her family is healing, which Susie refers to as "the lovely bones" that grew around her absence. Susie finally enters Heaven, saying, "My name is Salmon, like the fish; first name Susie. I was 14 years old when I was murdered on December 6, 1973. I was here for a moment and then I was gone. I wish you all a long and happy life".

== Cast ==
- Saoirse Ronan as Susie Salmon, the main character and narrator. She is a 14-year-old girl who is killed by a male neighbor. Ronan was 14 years old at the time of her casting and filming. Ronan and her family were originally reluctant for her to accept the role because of the subject matter, but agreed after meeting with Jackson.
  - Evelyn Lennon as Susie at age 3
- Mark Wahlberg as Jack Salmon, Susie's father, who becomes obsessed with his daughter's murder case. Wahlberg said that his role in the film encouraged him to be a more cautious parent with his three children and to talk to them more about "not talking to strangers."
- Rachel Weisz as Abigail Salmon, Susie's mother. After Susie's murder, Abigail despairs and abandons the family. Weisz stated that playing the character and the film and novel's "uplifting theme" made her look at life as a "treasure". She said the film gave her a "positive feeling" in total, rather than a "depressed" one.
- Susan Sarandon as Grandma Lynn, Susie's maternal grandmother. Sarandon said that her character is like a "comic relief" and that her character deals with the pain of Susie's death by drinking, smoking and shooting guns.
- Stanley Tucci as George Harvey, a serial killer who murdered Susie. Tucci said that he had researched his role by watching documentaries and reading books by criminal profiler John E. Douglas about catching serial killers. His wife Kate had urged him against taking the role. After having read the novel, she felt that the subject matter was "too harrowing."
- Michael Imperioli as Detective Len Fenerman, the detective in charge of investigating Susie's death.
- Rose McIver as Lindsey Salmon, Susie's 13-year-old younger sister. She is the first to suspect that Harvey was involved in Susie's death. Jackson cast McIver particularly because she was an unknown actress. McIver said that she had read and been a fan of the novel before having been cast in the film.
- Christian Thomas Ashdale as Buckley Salmon, Susie's 4-year-old younger brother.
- Reece Ritchie as Ray Singh, Susie's love interest and friend who is strongly affected by Susie's death.
- Carolyn Dando as Ruth Connors, a classmate of Susie's. Jackson said that, after he had searched all over the world for the role, he ultimately chose to cast Dando, a relatively unknown New Zealand actress, who was working as a waitress.
- Charlie Saxton as Ronald Drake, one of the murder suspects.
- AJ Michalka as Clarissa, Susie's best friend, who is dating Brian Nelson. Michalka was better known as a musician prior to this role.
- Nikki SooHoo as Denise "Holly" Le Ang, Susie's best friend in Heaven and another of Harvey's victims.
- Jake Abel as Brian Nelson, Clarissa's boyfriend. He beats up Jack, believing he would assault him and Clarissa.
- Thomas McCarthy as Principal Caden.

== Production ==
=== Development ===
In May 2000, Film4 Productions acquired feature film rights to Alice Sebold's novel The Lovely Bones, before the manuscript was completed. Producer Aimee Peyronnet had sought to attract studio interest to the manuscript, and an insider informed Film4's deputy head of production, Jim Wilson, of the project. The company attached Luc Besson and Peyronnet's production company Seaside to the project, two years before the novel's publication. By February 2001, Lynne Ramsay was hired to write and direct the film adaptation of the novel. In July 2002, Channel 4 shut down Film4, causing Hollywood studios and producers to pursue acquisition of feature film rights to The Lovely Bones, which had spent multiple weeks at the top of the New York Times Best Seller list.

The film adaptation, which had been estimated at a budget of $15 million, remained with Channel 4 under its newly developed inhouse film unit, with Ramsay still contracted to write and direct. By October 2002, Ramsay was writing the script with Liana Dognini, with filming planned for mid-2003. Author Sebold was invited by the producers to provide input.

In July 2003, the studio DreamWorks negotiated a first-look deal with producer Peyronnet, after DreamWorks co-founder Steven Spielberg expressed interest in the project. DreamWorks did not acquire the rights to the novel, and Ramsay was eventually detached from the project. She says that FilmFour wanted a version more faithful to the novel. In a 2012 interview, Ramsay said her script departed from the novel significantly, saying "I really didn't like the My Little Pony, she's-in-heaven, everything's-OK aspect." She had depicted the scenes with Susie in heaven as purely in her father's imagination. In Ramsay's script, the father befriended Mr. Harvey, never suspecting him of having killed his daughter.

In April 2004, producers Peter Jackson, Fran Walsh and Philippa Boyens entered negotiations to develop the project. Jackson described the book as "a wonderfully emotional and powerful story. Like all the best fantasy, it has a solid grounding in the real world". By January 2005, Jackson and Walsh planned to independently purchase film rights and to seek studio financing after a script had been developed. The producers sought to begin adapting a spec script for The Lovely Bones in January 2006, with the goal of script completion and budget estimation by the following May.

Jackson explained he enjoyed the novel because he found it "curiously optimistic" and uplifting because of the narrator's sense of humor, adding there was a difference between its tone and subject matter. He felt very few films dealt with the loss of a loved one. Jackson foresaw the most challenging element in the novel to adapt was the portrayal of Susie, the protagonist, in her heaven, and making it "ethereal and emotional but not hokey". Saoirse Ronan later said that Jackson chose to depict the afterlife as depending on Susie's emotions. "Whenever Susie feels happy, Heaven is sunny and there's birds and everything. Whenever it's not so great, it's raining or she's in the middle of an ocean". Jackson described the book's description of "heaven" as being an "In-Between" rather than a true heaven and said that he was not trying to paint a definitive picture of heaven itself. "[W]hen Jackson created Susie's heaven, in a 1973 world, he went through the Partridge Family television show archives as a reference".

A 120-page draft of the script was written by September 2006. In April 2007, the script was completed by Jackson, Walsh and Boyens; Jackson intended to direct. The three producers began seeking a studio partner to finance the film adaptation. Besides the major studios, smaller companies including United Artists were also contacted. New Line Cinema was excluded from negotiations because of Jackson's legal dispute with the studio over royalties from his The Lord of the Rings trilogy. Jackson sought a beginning $65 million budget for The Lovely Bones, also requesting from studios what kind of promotional commitments and suggestions they would make for the film adaptation.

By May, four studios remained interested in the project: DreamWorks, Warner Bros., Sony and Universal. The Lovely Bones was sold to DreamWorks for $70 million. Paramount Pictures received the rights to distribute the film worldwide.

=== Filming ===
In casting, Ryan Gosling was originally chosen for the role later given to Mark Wahlberg. He was fired by Jackson the day filming was scheduled to start. Gosling had gained weight and grown a beard for the role but said, "The age of the character versus my real age [of twenty-six] was always a concern of mine. Peter [Jackson] and I tried to make it work and ultimately it just didn't. I think the film is much better off with Mark Wahlberg in that role". Gosling said that he had made these physical changes without having discussed them with Jackson and ultimately Jackson thought it was wrong for the character. Speaking about replacing Gosling with Wahlberg, Jackson stated in 2026: "(Ryan Gosling) just got to realize that what (he was) imagining isn’t really quite happening, which means that we got it wrong and so we take full responsibility... It’s just a complicated sort of amalgam of communication of how somebody gels into a group of people, into a story, into a character".

Production began in October 2007 in the U.S. state of Pennsylvania and in New Zealand. Shooting in parts of Delaware, Chester and Montgomery counties, including Hatfield, Ridley Township, Phoenixville, Royersford, Malvern and East Fallowfield, lasted a few weeks. Most of the studio shooting was done at Stone Street Studios in New Zealand.

In December 2008, Brian Eno signed on to compose the score. Fran Walsh, a fan of his work, had suggested him to Jackson. Jackson had called Eno to request use of two of his early tracks to evoke atmosphere for the 1970s scenes in the film. When Eno asked if he could compose the whole score, Jackson was surprised, since he had heard Eno did not like working on films. For the ending, Eno uncovered a demo he had done in 1973 and reunited with the vocalist to create the version for the film, saying: "That song from 1973 was finally finished in 2008!"

In November 2009, Jackson said that he re-shot new footage of Harvey's death scene after test audiences said that it was not violent enough "to give people the satisfaction they needed". Jackson wanted to stay within constraints that would enable the movie receive a PG-13 rating, so that it could attract the widest possible audience, despite the violent nature of some scenes.

== Release ==
=== Marketing strategy ===
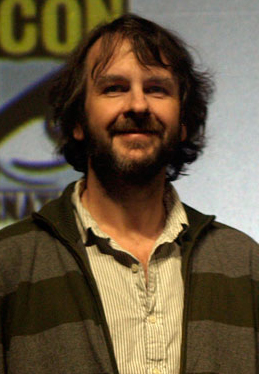
Jackson at the 2009 San Diego Comic-Con Film Festival. At the festival Jackson discussed The Lovely Bones and screened a clip from it.

The Lovely Bones was originally scheduled for release on March 13, 2009, but it was delayed to December 11, 2009, in the United States as the studio became interested in releasing the film for "awards season". Jackson gained a chance to make some effects shots larger in scope. The film received a limited theater release on December 11, 2009, in the United States. The film was originally set to have a wider United States theater release on December 25, 2009 (Christmas Day), as part of a campaign to build its momentum into January 2010. In early December it was confirmed that the United States wide release date had been pushed back by three weeks to January 15, 2010. Paramount and DreamWorks did not give a reason for the change of the release date.

The film premiered in New Zealand on December 26, 2009. The film had its UK premiere at the Royal Film Performance, an event held in aid of the Film & TV Charity, on November 24, 2009, at the ODEON Leicester Square. It was released in the United Kingdom on January 29 and in other countries in January 2010.

According to the Los Angeles Times, Paramount invested $70 million in production and an additional $85 million in worldwide marketing and distribution. In late July 2009, as part of the promotion, Jackson talked about the film and screened a 4 1/2 minute clip at the San Diego Comic-Con Film Festival.

A teaser trailer was released online in August 2009, days before the film's official trailer on television. The official trailer debuted on the television series Entertainment Tonight and was released online shortly afterwards. In August 2009, Jackson offered a "behind-the-scenes look" at the film and discussed elements (mainly violence) in the film's plot line.

The Los Angeles Times reported that Paramount had originally expected the film to appeal to a "sophisticated, adult audience". But after poor revenue and average reviews, the studio decided to redirect the film to an audience in another age group. Surveys showed that the film was favored more by females aged 13–20 than by any other demographic. Paramount began to screen the movie "aggressively for high school- and college-age girls" during its three-screen limited release.

=== Box office ===
On December 11, 2009, the film was released on three screens in Los Angeles and New York. As of January 4, 2010, the film had grossed over $389,000 in the US. Claudia Eller and Ben Fritz of the Los Angeles Times felt that it did poorly at the box office in the first few weeks of its release because of average reviews and negative word-of-mouth. During its opening-weekend release on three screens, it earned over $116,616, an average of estimated $38,872 per-theater revenue. The film's revenue placed it at thirtieth place on the box office chart. In the film's second and third weeks of release, the film saw a decrease; in the fourth week, it had a 54.3-percent increase.

When put into wide release on January 15, 2010, it grossed $17,005,133 that weekend, ranking number three at the US box office. By the end of its run it had grossed a total of $93,621,340.

== Reception ==
=== Critical reception ===
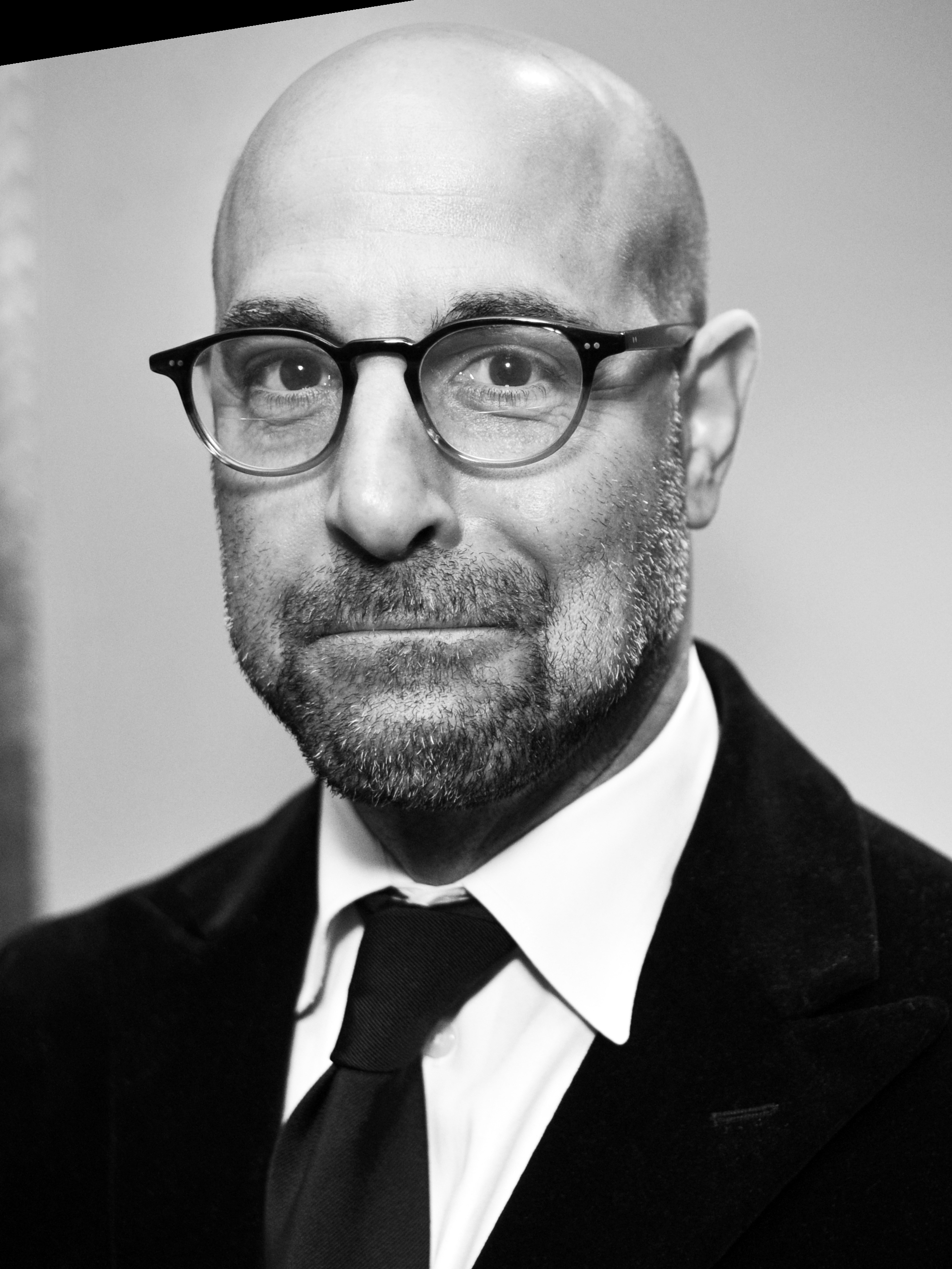
Stanley Tucci's performance was well received and earned him multiple Best Supporting Actor nominations

Although Ronan and Tucci were praised for their performances, The Lovely Bones received mixed reviews from critics. On review aggregator Rotten Tomatoes, the film has a critics approval rating of 31%, based on 244 reviews, with an average rating of 5.00/10. The site's critical consensus reads: "It's stuffed full of Peter Jackson's typically dazzling imagery, but The Lovely Bones suffers from abrupt shifts between horrific violence and cloying sentimentality". Metacritic gave the film a score of 42 out of 100, based on 36 critics, indicating "mixed or average reviews". Audiences polled by CinemaScore gave the film an average grade of "B" on an A+ to F scale.

Ian Freer of Empire gave the film four out of five. Freer emphasized the "bold, daring original filmmaking, with arguably more emotional and intellectual meat to chew on than either the Rings trilogy or Kong". Freer noted that, like The Lord of the Rings, the film "does a fantastic job with revered, complex source material" and that, since it is "as terrific on terra firma as it is audacious in its astral plane", it is "doubtful" that there would be a "more imaginative" and "courageous film" in 2010.

Richard Corliss of Time wrote that "through [Peter] Jackson's art" and Ronan's "magic", the "obscenity of child murder has been invested with immense gravity and grace" and "like the story of Susie's life after death, that's a miracle". Peter Travers of Rolling Stone felt that the film was "conveyed" in a "remarkable performance" by Ronan and described Tucci as being "magnificent as a man of uncontrollable impulses" to "help Jackson cut a path to a humanity that supersedes life and death". Travers praised Jackson for building "jolting suspense". Despite praising the film, Travers noted that, while the book "never flinched", the film does. He says that the "business is being transacted" by Jackson with a "Lord of the Rings fantasy", but in this film he "attunes himself to a family tragedy".

Claudia Puig of USA Today gave the film two out of four, writing that while "[Peter] Jackson gets the thriller scenes right", the "conceit of Susie trapped in a DayGlo world between the one she left and her final resting place, imparting lessons on coping with death, feels preachy". Puig also described the film as having "clashing tones" that veer from "lightheartedness to heavy-handedness". She criticized the film's computer-generated imagery, describing it as being "cheesy" and saying that it broke "no ground".

Kirt Honeycutt of The Hollywood Reporter described the film as telling "a fundamentally different story" than the novel. It is "one that is not without its tension, humor and compelling details", but "it's also a simpler, more button-pushing tale that misses the joy and heartbreak of the original". Honeycutt said that Jackson had transformed Sebold's "startling, unique novel about the aftermath of a terrible murder" into a story that's more "focused on crime and punishment".

"[Alice] Sebold's book would've had a tough leap to the multiplex no matter who guided it. But [Peter] Jackson is too enamored with the idea of mixing heaven and the heebie-jeebies, so he's made the skeevy equivalent of a Mitch Albom book with some pulp fiction pressed between its covers."

— Joe Neumaier, New York Daily News

Stephanie Zacharek of Salon viewed the film as being "an expensive-looking mess that fails to capture the mood, and the poetry, of its source material" because it has "good actors fighting a poorly conceived script, under the guidance of a director who can no longer make the distinction between imaginativeness and computer-generated effects". Todd McCarthy of Variety felt that Jackson had undermined the "solid work from a good cast" with "show-offy celestial evocations" that "severely disrupt the emotional connections with the characters". McCarthy said that the film, overall, was a "significant artistic disappointment".

Joe Neumaier of New York Daily News described Jackson as having "siphoned out all the soulfulness" that made the author's "combination thriller/afterlife fantasy a best-seller" and that the film was "a gumball-colored potboiler that's more squalid than truly mournful". Neumaier also wrote that the film and Jackson "wasted" a "good cast". Roger Ebert of Chicago Sun-Times gave the film 1.5 stars out of four, calling it "deplorable", and criticizing the apparent message that Susie's murder eventually made her happier. He also criticized the film's portrayal of Heaven, which he compared to "a happy gathering of new Facebook friends". But he praised the acting, stating that "this whole film is Jackson's fault".

The British Board of Film Classification (BBFC) reported that 24 objections were made to the rating given to The Lovely Bones, more than for any other film in 2010. The BBFC stated: "Many found the film to be a shocking and upsetting experience. The scene in which young Susie is entrapped by the killer, and the subsequent sequence in which the killer soaks in a bath after the murder, were compared by some complainants to scenes in '18' rated horror films". The BBFC rated the film a 12A, and many complained that the movie was upsetting for a younger audience. Nevertheless, the BBFC defended its rating: "The Lovely Bones lacked any explicit detail of the murder and any sexual elements were downplayed. The audience's sympathies remain entirely with the family and the film had many positive messages about life".

The Irish Film Classification Office (IFCO) initially rated the film a higher 15A, for the "child abduction and murder" theme. This was lowered to 12A following a distributor appeal, a decision which also received their most complaints of 2010.

=== Accolades ===
Award	Category	Nominee	Result
7th Irish Film and Television Awards	Best Leading Actress	Saoirse Ronan	Won
63rd British Academy Film Awards	Best Actress in a Leading Role	Saoirse Ronan	Nominated
63rd British Academy Film Awards	Best Actor in a Supporting Role	Stanley Tucci	Nominated
82nd Academy Awards	Best Supporting Actor	Stanley Tucci	Nominated
67th Golden Globe Awards	Best Performance by an Actor in a Supporting Role in a Motion Picture	Stanley Tucci	Nominated
16th Screen Actors Guild Awards	Outstanding Performance by a Male Actor in a Supporting Role	Stanley Tucci	Nominated
36th Saturn Awards	Best Fantasy Film		Nominated
36th Saturn Awards	Best Supporting Actress	Susan Sarandon	Nominated
36th Saturn Awards	Best Supporting Actor	Stanley Tucci	Nominated
36th Saturn Awards	Best Performance by a Younger Actor	Saoirse Ronan	Won
36th Saturn Awards	Best Music	Brian Eno	Nominated
2009 Washington DC Area Film Critics Association Awards	Best Supporting Actor	Stanley Tucci	Nominated
2009 Washington DC Area Film Critics Association Awards	Best Art Direction	The Lovely Bones	Nominated
2009 Broadcast Film Critics Association Awards	Best Actress	Saoirse Ronan	Nominated
2009 Broadcast Film Critics Association Awards	Best Young Actor/Actress	Saoirse Ronan	Won
2009 Broadcast Film Critics Association Awards	Best Supporting Actor	Stanley Tucci	Nominated
2009 Broadcast Film Critics Association Awards	Best Art Direction	The Lovely Bones	Nominated
2009 Broadcast Film Critics Association Awards	Best Cinematography	The Lovely Bones	Nominated
2009 Broadcast Film Critics Association Awards	Best Visual Effects	The Lovely Bones	Nominated

=== Home media ===
The film was released in the US on DVD and two-disc Blu-ray April 20, 2010 and in the United Kingdom on June 11, 2010. An Ultra HD 4K Blu-ray is scheduled to be released on November 10, 2026.

== See also ==
- List of ghost films
