= WingNut Films =

New Zealand production company

WingNut Films Productions Ltd.
- Type: Public
- Industry: Motion picture
- Founded: 14 February 1987; 39 years ago (as an independent film company); 17 March 2003; 23 years ago (as an incorporated company)
- Founders: Peter Jackson; Michael Stephens
- Headquarters: Wellington, New Zealand
- Key people: Michael Stephens; Peter Jackson; Fran Walsh
- Products: The Hobbit; The Lord of the Rings
- Subsidiaries: Wingnut Interactive (2006–2013); Wingnut AR (2017–present)

WingNut Films Productions Ltd is a New Zealand production company based in Wellington, with other offices in Hollywood, United States, London, United Kingdom, and Melbourne, Australia; it is notable for producing and collaborating predominantly with filmmaker Peter Jackson, especially on The Lord of the Rings. WingNut Films also has produced at Pinewood Studios in England. Its U.S. subsidiary is WingNut Films, Inc.

== History ==
WingNut Films has been involved in nearly all of Peter Jackson's work. The company is known for being involved in Jackson's The Lord of the Rings film series, based on the classic fantasy novel of the same name by English author J. R. R. Tolkien. The third film in the series received eleven Academy Awards, including Best Picture and Best Director. The company also became involved in The Hobbit after director Guillermo del Toro left the project.

== Filmography ==
- Bad Taste (1987)
- Meet the Feebles (1989)
- Braindead (1992)
- Valley of the Stereos (1992)
- Heavenly Creatures (1994)
- Forgotten Silver (1995)
- Jack Brown Genius (1996)
- The Frighteners (1996)
- The Lord of the Rings: The Fellowship of the Ring (2001)
- The Lord of the Rings: The Two Towers (2002)
- The Lord of the Rings: The Return of the King (2003)
- King Kong (2005)
- District 9 (2009)
- The Lovely Bones (2009)
- The Adventures of Tintin (2011)
- West of Memphis (2012)
- The Hobbit: An Unexpected Journey (2012)
- The Hobbit: The Desolation of Smaug (2013)
- The Hobbit: The Battle of the Five Armies (2014)
- Mortal Engines (2018)
- They Shall Not Grow Old (2018)
- The Beatles: Get Back (2021)
- The Lord of the Rings: The War of the Rohirrim (2024)
- The Beatles Anthology (2025)
- The Lord of the Rings: The Hunt for Gollum (2027)
- Untitled The Adventures of Tintin sequel (TBA)

== Braindead lawsuit ==
Jackson's 1992 comedy horror film Braindead was subject to a lawsuit: in Bradley vs. WingNut Films Ltd. [1993] 1 NZLR 415, it was alleged that Braindead had infringed the privacy of the plaintiffs by containing pictures of the plaintiff's family tombstone. After reviewing the New Zealand judicial authorities on privacy, Gallen J stated: "the present situation in New Zealand ... is that there are three strong statements in the High Court in favour of the existence of such a tort in this country and an acceptance by the Court of Appeal that the concept is at least arguable." This case became one of a series of cases which contributed to the introduction of tort invasions of privacy in New Zealand.

== See also ==
- List of film production companies
- List of television production companies
