= Jabez Olssen =

New Zealand film editor

- Born: 5 August 1975 (age 50); Dunedin, New Zealand

Jabez Olssen (born 5 August 1975) is a New Zealand film and television editor who has worked extensively with director Peter Jackson.

Starting in 1998, Olssen worked in the editorial department of two television programs in New Zealand. He was then hired to work with principal editor Michael J. Horton on The Lord of the Rings: The Two Towers (directed by Peter Jackson – 2002). Olssen was ultimately credited as an "additional editor" on this film. The two editors won the Online Film Critics Society Award and the Las Vegas Film Critics Society Award for this film.

Olssen said of his work "Anyway, if I never get to edit anything ever again, I can still say that I've edited scenes with Gollum in them and I've edited scenes with Darth Vader in them so, I'm good."

He won an Emmy in the 2022 award ceremony for Outstanding Picture Editing for a Nonfiction Program for his work on The Beatles: Get Back.

== Filmography ==
=== Editor ===
Year	Title	Notes
2001	The Lord of the Rings: The Fellowship of the Ring	Assistant editor
2002	The Lord of the Rings: The Two Towers	Additional editor
2005	King Kong	Additional editor
2007	Fog	Short film
2008	Crossing the Line	Short film
2009	The Lovely Bones	
2012	The Hobbit: An Unexpected Journey	Uncredited Role: Erebor Dwarf Refugee
2013	The Hobbit: The Desolation of Smaug	Role: Fish Monger
2014	The Hobbit: The Battle of the Five Armies	
2016	Rogue One: A Star Wars Story	
2018	They Shall Not Grow Old	
2021	The Beatles: Get Back	
2025	Jurassic World Rebirth	
