= Peter Jackson =

New Zealand filmmaker (born 1961)

Sir Peter Jackson ONZ KNZM
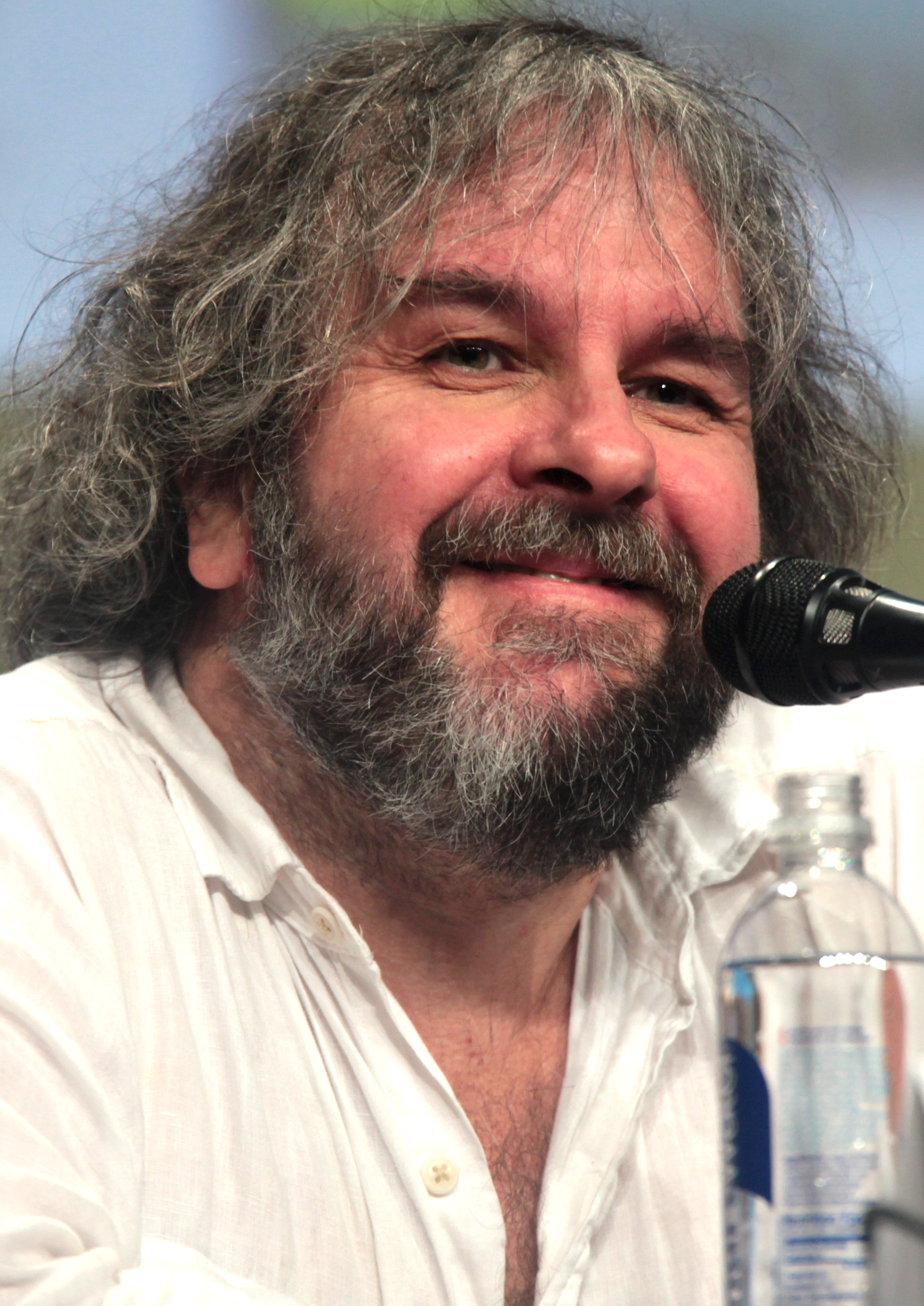
- Jackson in 2014
- Born: Peter Robert Jackson; 31 October 1961 (age 65); Wellington, New Zealand
- Occupations: Director; producer; writer
- Years active: 1976–present
- Partner: Fran Walsh (1987–present)
- Children: 2

Sir Peter Robert Jackson (born 31 October 1961) is a New Zealand filmmaker. He is best known as the director, screen-writer, and producer of the Lord of the Rings trilogy (2001–2003) and the Hobbit trilogy (2012–2014), both of which are adapted from the novels of the same name by J. R. R. Tolkien. Jackson's other notable films include the comedy horror films Braindead (1992) and The Frighteners (1996), the drama Heavenly Creatures (1994), the monster remake King Kong (2005), and the World War I documentary They Shall Not Grow Old (2018). Jackson also directed and produced the documentary mini-series The Beatles: Get Back (2021). Jackson's films have grossed over $6.5 billion worldwide, making him the fifth-highest-grossing film director of all time.

Jackson began his career in the 1980s with comedy horror films like Bad Taste (1987) and Meet the Feebles (1989), followed in the 1990s with Braindead (1992) and The Frighteners (1996). He shared a nomination for Academy Award for Best Original Screenplay with his collaborator Fran Walsh for Heavenly Creatures, which brought him to mainstream prominence in the film industry. For The Lord of the Rings: The Return of the King (2003), Jackson won three Academy Awards for Best Picture, Best Director, and Best Adapted Screenplay. His other accolades include three BAFTAs, a Golden Globe, two Primetime Emmy Awards, and four Saturn Awards among others.

Jackson established WingNut Films as his production company in 1987. In 1993, he co-founded the Wellington-based companies Weta Workshop (now Wētā Workshop), to handle special and physical effects, and Weta Digital (now Wētā FX), to focus on digital visual effects. In 2002, Jackson was appointed a Companion of the New Zealand Order of Merit. He was later knighted as a Knight Companion of the order by the Governor-General of New Zealand, Sir Anand Satyanand, at a ceremony in Wellington in April 2010. Jackson received a star on the Hollywood Walk of Fame in December 2014, and in May 2026, he was awarded the Honorary Palme d'Or at the 79th Cannes Film Festival in recognition of his lifetime contribution to cinema. He is one of the wealthiest New Zealanders, with an estimated net worth of $1.9 billion in 2026.

== Early life and education ==
Jackson was born on 31 October 1961 in Wellington (Note: Pryor (2003) states "Shortly before sunset on October 31, Joan Jackson gave birth to her first child at Wellington Hospital.") and was raised in its far northern suburb of Pukerua Bay. His parents – Joan (née Ruck), a factory worker and housewife, and William "Bill" Jackson, a wages clerk – were immigrants from England.

As a child, Jackson was a keen film fan, growing up on Ray Harryhausen films, as well as finding inspiration in the television series Thunderbirds and Monty Python's Flying Circus. After a family friend gave the Jacksons a Super 8 cine-camera with Peter in mind, he began making short films with his friends. Jackson has long cited King Kong as his favourite film, and around the age of nine he attempted to remake it using his own stop-motion models. Also, as a child Jackson made a World War II epic called The Dwarf Patrol seen on the Bad Taste bonus disc, which featured his first special effect of poking pinholes in the film for gun shots, and a James Bond spoof named Coldfinger. Most notable though was a 20-minute short called The Valley, which won him a special prize because of the shots he used.

Jackson attended Kāpiti College, where he expressed no interest in sports. His classmates also remember him wearing a duffel coat with "an obsession verging on religious". He had no formal training in film-making, but learned about editing, visual effects and make-up largely through his own trial and error. As a young adult, Jackson discovered the work of author J. R. R. Tolkien after watching The Lord of the Rings (1978), an animated film by Ralph Bakshi that was a part-adaptation of Tolkien's fantasy trilogy. When he was 16 years old, Jackson left school and began working full-time as a photo-engraver for a Wellington newspaper, The Evening Post. For the seven years he worked there, Jackson lived at home with his parents so he could save as much money as possible to spend on film equipment. After two years of work Jackson bought a 16 mm camera, and began shooting a film that later became Bad Taste.

== Influences and inspirations ==
Jackson has long cited several films as influences. It is well known that Jackson has a passion for King Kong, often citing it as his favourite film and as the film that inspired him early in his life. Jackson recalls attempting to remake King Kong when he was nine. At the 2009 San Diego Comic-Con, while being interviewed alongside Avatar and Titanic director James Cameron, Jackson said certain films gave him a "kick". He mentioned Martin Scorsese's crime films Goodfellas and Casino, remarking on "something about those particular movies and the way Martin Scorsese just fearlessly rockets his camera around and has shot those films that I can watch those movies and feel inspired." Jackson said the 1970 film Waterloo inspired him in his youth. Other influences include George A. Romero, Steven Spielberg, Sam Raimi and the special effects by Ray Harryhausen.

== Career ==
=== Splatter phase ===
Jackson's first feature was Bad Taste, a haphazard fashion splatter comedy which took years to make. It included many of Jackson's friends acting and working on it for free. Shooting was normally done on weekends since Jackson was then working full-time. Bad Taste is about aliens that come to earth with the intention of turning humans into food. Jackson had two acting roles including a famous scene in which he fights himself on top of a cliff. The film was finally completed thanks to a late injection of finance from the New Zealand Film Commission, after Jim Booth, the body's executive director, became convinced of Jackson's talent (Booth later left the commission to become Jackson's producer). Bad Taste debuted at the Cannes Film Festival in May 1987.

Around this time, Jackson began working on writing a number of film scripts, in varied collaborative groupings with playwright Stephen Sinclair, writer Fran Walsh and writer/actor Danny Mulheron. Walsh would later become his life partner. Some of the scripts from this period, including a sequel to A Nightmare on Elm Street, have never been made into movies; the proposed zombie film Braindead underwent extensive rewrites.

Jackson's next film to see release was Meet the Feebles (1989), co-written with Sinclair, Walsh and Mulheron. Begun on a very low budget, Meet the Feebles went weeks over schedule. Jackson stated of his second feature-length film, "It's got a quality of humour that alienates a lot of people. It's very black, very satirical, very savage."

=== Heavenly Creatures and Forgotten Silver ===
Released in 1994 after Jackson won a race to bring the story to the screen, Heavenly Creatures marked a major change for Jackson in terms of both style and tone. The real-life 1950s Parker–Hulme murder case, in which two teenage girls murdered one of their mothers, inspired the film. It was Fran Walsh that persuaded him that these events had the makings of a movie; Jackson has been quoted saying that the film "only got made" because of her enthusiasm for the subject matter. The film's fame coincided with the New Zealand media tracking down the real-life Juliet Hulme, who wrote books under the name Anne Perry. Melanie Lynskey and Kate Winslet played Parker and Hulme, respectively. Heavenly Creatures was critically acclaimed and was nominated for Best Original Screenplay at the Academy Awards and made top ten of the year lists in Time, The Guardian, The Sydney Morning Herald, and The New Zealand Herald.

The following year, in collaboration with Wellington film-maker Costa Botes, Jackson co-directed the mockumentary Forgotten Silver (1995). This ambitious made-for-television piece told the story of a fictitious New Zealand film pioneer, Colin McKenzie, who had supposedly invented colour film and 'talkies', and attempted an epic film of Salome before being forgotten by the world. Though the programme played in a slot normally reserved for drama, no other warning was given that it was fictionalised and many viewers were outraged at discovering Colin McKenzie had never existed. The number of people who believed the increasingly improbable story provides testimony to Jackson and Botes' skill at playing on New Zealand's national myth of a nation of innovators and forgotten trail-blazers.

=== Hollywood, Wētā, and the Film Commission ===
The success of Heavenly Creatures helped pave the way for Jackson's first big budget Hollywood film, The Frighteners starring Michael J. Fox, in 1996. Jackson was given permission to make this comedy / horror film entirely in New Zealand despite being set in a North American town. This period was a key one of change for both Jackson and Wētā Workshop, the visual effects company – born from the one-man contributions of George Port to Heavenly Creatures – with which Jackson is often associated.

Wētā, initiated by Jackson and key collaborators, grew rapidly during this period to incorporate both digital and physical effects, make-up and costumes, the first two areas normally commanded by Jackson collaborator Richard Taylor.

The Frighteners was regarded as a box office failure. Film critic Roger Ebert expressed disappointment stating that "incredible effort has resulted in a film that looks more like a demo reel than a movie". In February 1997, Jackson launched legal proceedings against the New Zealand Listener magazine for defamation, over a review of The Frighteners which claimed that the film was "built from the rubble of other people's movies". In the end, the case was not pursued further. Around this time Jackson's remake of King Kong was shelved by Universal Studios, partly because of Mighty Joe Young and Godzilla, both giant monster movies, that had already gone into production. Universal feared it would be thrown aside by the two higher budget movies.

This period of transition seems not to have been entirely a happy one; it also marked one of the high points of tension between Jackson and the New Zealand Film Commission since Meet the Feebles had gone over-budget earlier in his career. Jackson has claimed the Commission considered firing him from Feebles, though the NZFC went on to help fund his next three films. In 1997, the director submitted a lengthy criticism of the commission for a magazine supplement meant to celebrate the body's 20th anniversary, criticising what he called inconsistent decision-making by inexperienced board members. The magazine felt that the material was too long and potentially defamatory to publish in that form; a shortened version of the material went on to appear in Metro magazine. In the Metro article Jackson criticised the Commission over funding decisions concerning a film he was hoping to executive produce, but refused to drop a client-confidentiality provision that would have allowed them to publicly reply to his criticisms.

=== The Lord of the Rings ===
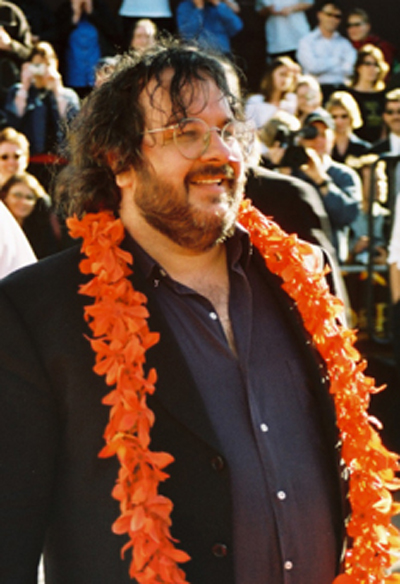
Peter Jackson at the premiere of The Lord of the Rings: The Return of the King on 1 December 2003 at the Embassy Theatre in Wellington

Jackson won the rights to film Tolkien's epic in 1997 after meeting with producer Saul Zaentz. Originally working with Miramax Films towards a two-film production, Jackson was later pressured to render the story as a single film, and finally overcame a tight deadline by making a last-minute deal with New Line, which was keen on a trilogy.

Principal photography extended from 11 October 1999 to 22 December 2000 with extensive location filming across New Zealand. With the benefit of extended post-production and extra periods of shooting before each film's release, the series met with huge success and sent Jackson's popularity soaring. The Return of the King received huge critical acclaim, winning all eleven Academy Awards it was nominated for, including Best Picture and Best Director. The film was the first of the fantasy film genre to win the award for Best Picture and was the second sequel to win Best Picture (the first being The Godfather Part II). Jackson's mother, Joan, died three days before the release of the first movie in the trilogy, The Fellowship of the Ring. There was a special showing of the film after her funeral.

=== King Kong ===
Universal Studios signed Jackson for a second time to remake the 1933 classic King Kong. The film was released on 14 December 2005 to critical acclaim and grossed around US$562 million worldwide. He also collaborated with game designer Michel Ancel from Ubisoft to make a video game adaptation of the film, which released 21 November 2005 and was also a critical and commercial success.

=== Crossing the Line ===
In 2007, Jackson directed a short film entitled Crossing the Line, to test a new model of digital cinema camera, the Red One. The film takes place during World War I, and was shot in two days. Crossing the Line was shown at NAB 2007 (the USA National Association of Broadcasters). Clips of the film can be found at Reduser.net.

=== The Lovely Bones ===
Jackson completed an adaptation of Alice Sebold's bestseller, The Lovely Bones, which was released in the United States on 11 December 2009. Jackson has said the film was a welcome relief from his larger-scale epics. The storyline's combination of fantasy aspects and themes of murder share some similarities with Heavenly Creatures. The film ended up receiving generally mixed reviews and middling box office returns yet earned Stanley Tucci an Academy Award for Best Supporting Actor nomination.

=== Tintin franchise ===
Jackson was one of three producers on The Adventures of Tintin: The Secret of the Unicorn, directed by Steven Spielberg and released in 2011. He is officially credited as producer but before he began working on The Hobbit, helped Spielberg direct the film. Jamie Bell and Andy Serkis were cast due to their collaboration with Peter Jackson on King Kong and The Lord of the Rings. Spielberg chose to collaborate with Peter Jackson due to his work on the Lord of the Rings series, and knew Peter Jackson's visual effects company Wētā Digital would make his vision a reality. It received positive reviews and grossed $374 million at the box office.

In December 2011, Spielberg said that a sequel was planned, but this time he would be in a producing role, with Jackson as director. Kathleen Kennedy said the script might be done by February or March 2012 and motion-captured in summer 2012, so that the movie would be on track to be released by Christmas 2014 or mid-2015. In February 2012, Spielberg said that a story outline for the sequel had been completed. In December 2012, Jackson said that the Tintin schedule was to shoot performance-capture in 2013, aiming for a release in 2015. On 12 March 2013, Spielberg said, "Don't hold me to it, but we're hoping the film will come out around Christmas-time in 2015. We know which books we're making, we can't share that now but we're combining two books which were always intended to be combined by Herge."

In December 2014, Peter Jackson said that the Tintin sequel would be made "at some point soon", although he intended to focus on directing two New Zealand films before that. The following year, Anthony Horowitz, who was hired as the sequel's screenwriter even before the release of the first film, stated that he was no longer working on the sequel, and was unsure if it was still being made. In June 2016, Spielberg confirmed that the sequel was still in development, but Jackson is working on a secret project in the meantime.

=== The Hobbit ===
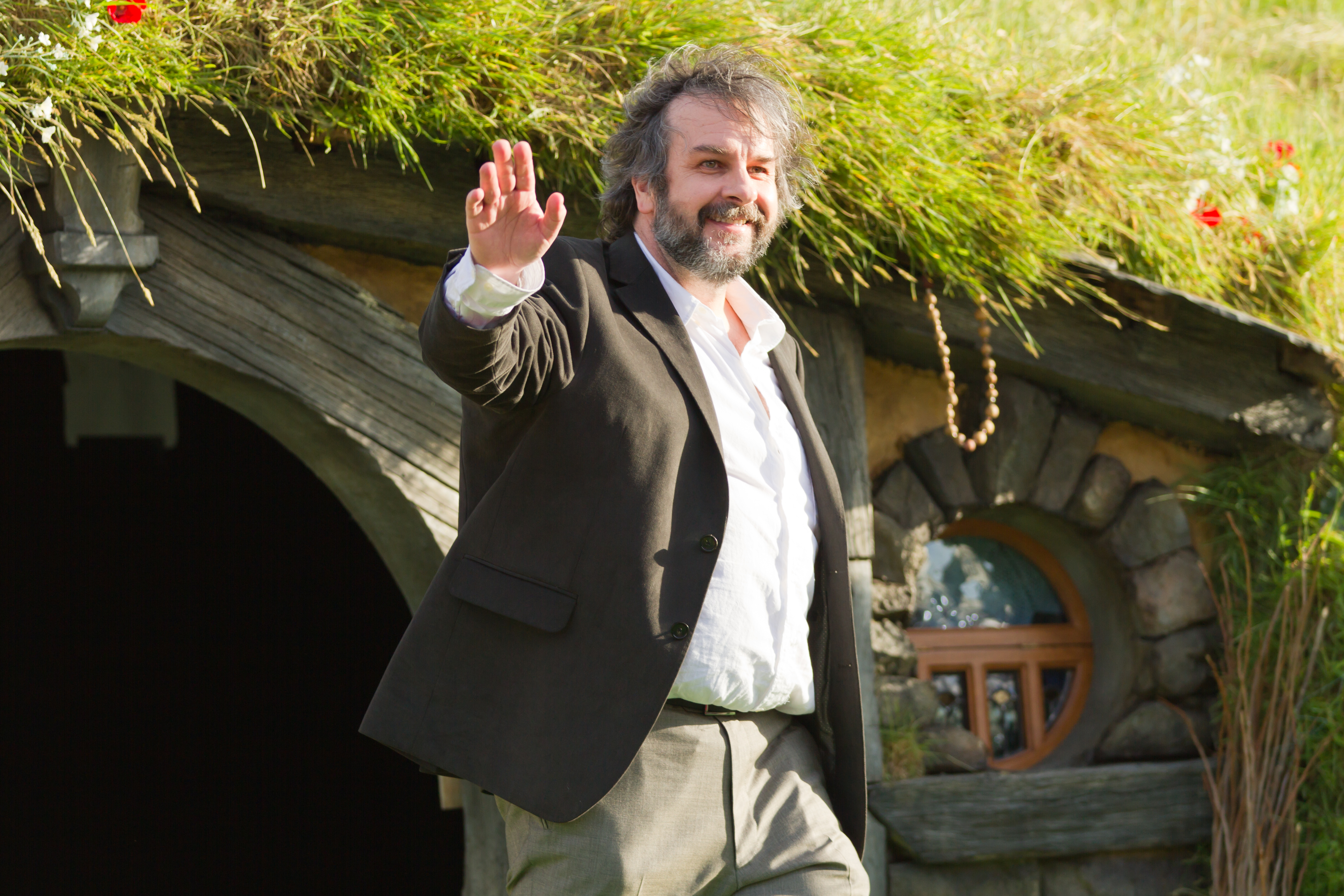
Jackson at the world premiere of The Hobbit: An Unexpected Journey on 28 November 2012 in Wellington

Jackson's involvement in the making of a film version of The Hobbit has a long and chequered history. In November 2006, a letter from Peter Jackson and Fran Walsh stated that due to an ongoing legal dispute between Wingnut Films (Jackson's production company) and New Line Cinema, Jackson would not be directing the film. New Line Cinema's head Robert Shaye commented that Jackson "... will never make any movie with New Line Cinema again while I'm still working at the company ...". This prompted an online call for a boycott of New Line Cinema, and by August 2007 Shaye was trying to repair his working relationship. On 18 December 2007, it was announced that Jackson and New Line Cinema had reached agreement to make two prequels, both based on The Hobbit, and to be released in 2012 and 2013 with Jackson as a writer and executive producer and Guillermo del Toro directing.

In early 2010, del Toro dropped out due to production delays and a month later Jackson was back in negotiations to direct The Hobbit; and on 15 October he was finalised as the director – with New Zealand confirmed as the location a couple of weeks later.

The film started production on 20 March 2011. On 30 July 2012, Jackson announced on his Facebook page that the two planned Hobbit movies would be expanded into a trilogy. He wrote that the third film would not act as a bridge between The Hobbit and The Lord of the Rings films, but would continue to expand The Hobbit story by using material found in the Lord of the Rings Appendices.

=== Documentaries and Beatles-related works ===
On 16 October 2018, Jackson's documentary about the First World War, They Shall Not Grow Old, was premiered as the Special Presentation at the BFI London Film Festival and followed by a question-and-answer session hosted by English film critic Mark Kermode. The film was created using original footage from Imperial War Museums' extensive archive, much of it previously unseen, alongside BBC and IWM interviews with servicemen who fought in the conflict. The majority of the footage (save for the start and end sections) has been colourised, converted to 3D and transformed with modern production techniques to present detail never seen before.

Before the screening, Jackson said, "This is not a story of the First World War, it is not a historical story, it may not even be entirely accurate but it's the memories of the men who fought – they're just giving their impressions of what it was like to be a soldier."

Reviewing the film for The Guardian, critic Peter Bradshaw said:

To mark the centenary of the First World War's end, Peter Jackson has created a visually staggering thought experiment; an immersive deep-dive into what it was like for ordinary British soldiers on the western front. This he has done using state-of-the-art digital technology to restore flickery old black-and-white archive footage of the servicemen's life in training and in the trenches. He has colourised it, sharpened it, put it in 3D, and, as well as using diaries and letters for narrative voiceover, he has used lip-readers to help dub in what the men are actually saying. The effect is electrifying. The soldiers are returned to an eerie, hyperreal kind of life in front of our eyes, like ghosts or figures summoned up in a séance. The faces are unforgettable.

The film was broadcast on BBC Two on 11 November 2018 (the hundredth anniversary of the Armistice of World War I), earning acclaim for its restoration work, immersive atmosphere, and portrayal of war. To accompany the film, a special episode of the documentary series What Do Artists Do All Day?, which followed Peter Jackson making the film, aired the following day on BBC Four.

In October 2016, Jackson, who had announced his interest in a film adaptation of the novel Mortal Engines in 2009, stated that the film would be his next project as producer and co-writer, once again alongside Fran Walsh and Philippa Boyens. The film was directed by his long-time collaborator Christian Rivers. It stars Robert Sheehan, Hera Hilmar, Hugo Weaving, Jihae, Leila George, Ronan Raftery, and Stephen Lang. It premiered on 27 November 2018 in London, received negative reviews and was a box-office bomb.

On 30 January 2019, the fiftieth anniversary of the Beatles' rooftop concert, which was the band's final performance, Jackson announced that his next directorial work would be a documentary about the making of their final album Let It Be. In a process similar to his previous documentary project They Shall Not Grow Old, this created around "55 hours of never-before-seen footage and 140 hours of audio made available to [Jackson's team]", which are "the only footage of any note that documents them at work in the studio". The documentary used the techniques developed for They Shall Not Grow Old to transform the footage with modern production techniques, and seeks to display a new side of a period in the Beatles' history usually remembered as highly conflictual. Most of the used footage was originally recorded for the 1970 Let It Be documentary.

Clare Olssen and Jabez Olssen, respectively producer and editor of They Shall Not Grow Old, returned for this new project, with Ken Kamins, Jeff Jones and Jonathan Clyde as executive producers. The project was made with "the full co-operation" of Paul McCartney and Ringo Starr, the last two living Beatles, as well as John Lennon and George Harrison's widows Yoko Ono and Olivia Harrison. The film includes the full 42-minute last rooftop concert.

In March 2020, Walt Disney Studios announced they had acquired the worldwide distribution rights to Jackson's documentary, now titled The Beatles: Get Back (the name of a track featured on Let It Be, and the originally-planned name for the album). It was originally set to be released by Walt Disney Studios Motion Pictures on 27 August 2021 in the US and Canada with a subsequent global release to follow. In June 2021, it was announced that it would be released on Disney+ as a three-part documentary series on 25, 26 and 27 November 2021. The documentary was released to critical acclaim, and won five Primetime Emmy Awards, including Outstanding Documentary or Nonfiction Series and Primetime Emmy Award for Outstanding Directing for a Documentary/Nonfiction Program for Jackson.

The "de-mixing" technology developed to isolate instruments and vocals from old audio recordings to achieve a better sound quality in Get Back would have an effect on Beatles records themselves: Revolver: Special Edition, a 2022 reissue of the band's 1966 album Revolver, would use the technology to improve the album's audio quality. Annie Zaleski of The Guardian, who gave Special Edition a five out of five stars rating, wrote that: "new details tease out deeper meanings in the songs. Now more prominent, the low-lit backing harmonies on 'Here, There and Everywhere' remake the tune as an old-fashioned rock'n'roll love song; the piano bending out of key on 'I Want to Tell You' mirrors the narrator's insecurity; and McCartney's booming walking bass on 'Taxman' illuminates the biting, cynical tone of Harrison's lyrics... Revolver still sounds so vibrant." It would eventually lead to the release on 2 November 2023 of "Now and Then", dubbed "the last Beatles song", which used the technology to salvage audio from a 1977 demo by Lennon and a failed 1995 attempt by the other three ex-Beatles to complete the song (Lennon having been murdered in 1980), together with newly recorded music by McCartney and Starr, to finally release the song over 55 years after it was first conceived. The short documentary film Now and Then – The Last Beatles Song, featuring Jackson, chronicled the making of the song. "Now and Then" received received widespread attention and acclaim upon release, winning a Grammy Award and being considered a worthy finale for the Beatles.

Jackson personally directed the "Now and Then" music video, using new footage of McCartney and Starr and using restored old footage similarly to Get Back to have all four Beatles visually on-screen. In an interview days before the song's release, Jackson claimed that he had originally been "very reluctant" when offered to direct the video, but that McCartney, Starr and Apple "didn't even wait for me to say no" before proceeding to send him footage for the video. I found myself swept along as they quickly addressed my concerns. Paul and Ringo shot footage of themselves performing and sent that to me." He stated that he made the video thinking of it as a short film rather than a music video. The video was met with a mixed response, with praise for its emotional weight but criticism for the inclusion of the dead Harrison and Lennon into more recent footage.

=== New Lord of the Rings series ===
In May 2024, Warner Bros. Discovery CEO David Zaslav confirmed that Jackson and his collaborators Fran Walsh and Philippa Boyens would be producing a new Lord of the Rings film with the working title The Lord of the Rings: The Hunt for Gollum. The film is intended to be released in 2027, with Andy Serkis directing from a screenplay written by Walsh, Boyens, Phoebe Gittins and Arty Papageorgiou. The Hunt for Gollum is the first slate in a new Lord of the Rings film series developed through Warner Bros. label New Line Cinema. In February 2023, Warner Bros. Discovery had signed a deal with the Embracer Group to produce a new series of Lord of the Rings live-action films. On 10 May, RNZ reported that Wellington would serve as the production hub for the new Lord of the Rings films.

In a May 2026 interview with Deadline at the Cannes Film Festival, Jackson confirmed that he and Walsh were actively working on the script of his sequel to The Adventures of Tintin. By July, Jackson stated that the film would be his next directorial endeavor and that he was still working on the script. The following October, Jackson stated that the script was completed.

== Charitable activities ==
In 2006, Jackson gave NZ$500,000 to embryonic stem cell research. He purchased a church in the Wellington suburb of Seatoun for $1.06 million, saving it from demolition. He also contributes his expertise to 48HOURS, a New Zealand film-making competition, through annually selecting 3 "Wildcards" for the National Final.

Jackson, a World War I aviation enthusiast, is chair of the 14–18 Aviation Heritage Trust. He donated his services and provided replica aircraft to create a 10-minute multimedia display called Over the Front for the Australian War Memorial in 2008. He contributed to the defense fund for the West Memphis Three. In 2011, Jackson and Walsh purchased 1 Kent Terrace, the home of BATS Theatre in Wellington, effectively securing the theatre's future.

In 2012 Jackson supported the American Red Cross "Zombie Blood Drive" together with other famous artists such as The Black Keys band members and the cast of the show The Walking Dead.

== Other activities ==
His property portfolio in 2018 was estimated at NZ$150 million.

In 2009, he purchased a Gulfstream G550 jet registered ZK-KFB; Jackson is one of the richest people in the entertainment industry, with an estimated net worth upwards of $1.5 billion, cited by Forbes and multiple other highly reliable news sources. In early 2014 he replaced his Gulfstream G550, with a Gulfstream G650 also registered ZK-KFB. In April 2014, the aircraft was used in the search for MH370. The aircraft has subsequently been sold. Jackson owns an aircraft restoration and manufacturing company, The Vintage Aviator (based in Kilbirnie, Wellington, and at the Hood Aerodrome, Masterton), which is dedicated to World War I and World War II fighter planes among other planes from the 1920s and 1930s. He is chairman of the Omaka Aviation Heritage Trust, which hosts a biennial air show.

He owns a scale modelling company Wingnut Wings that specializes in World War I subjects. Wingnut Wings, however, closed in March 2020 with the ultimate fate of the company and its moulds not yet known.

Jackson became a billionaire in 2021 by selling Wētā to Unity Technologies, an interactive 3D gaming business.

Peter Jackson invested in Colossal Biosciences, a bio-science company that aims to bring back extinct creatures, like Wooly Mammoth, back to life.

== Style ==
Jackson is known for his attention to detail, a habit of shooting scenes from many angles, a macabre sense of humour, and a general playfulness – the latter to a point that The Lord of the Rings conceptual designer Alan Lee jokingly remarked, "the film is kind of incidental, really".

Jackson was a noted perfectionist on the Lord of the Rings shoot, where he demanded numerous takes of scenes, requesting additional takes by repeatedly saying, "one more for luck". (Note: Christopher Lee remarked about having twelve takes for one scene, and later he was told by Ian McKellen he did 24 takes for two lines the previous day.) Jackson is also renowned within the New Zealand film industry for his insistence on "coverage" – shooting a scene from as many angles as possible, giving him more options during editing. Jackson has been known to spend days shooting a single scene. This is evident in his work where even scenes featuring simple conversations often feature a wide array of multiple camera angles and shot-sizes as well as zooming closeups on characters' faces. One of his most common visual trademarks is shooting close-ups of actors with wide-angle lenses. He was an early user of computer enhancement technology and provided digital special effects to a number of Hollywood films.

=== Cameo roles ===
Jackson is one of the lead actors in two of his films: in Bad Taste, he plays two characters named Derek and Robert, even engaging them both in a fight. In the mockumentary Forgotten Silver, he plays himself.

However, he appears in most films he directs, mostly in cameos, just as director Alfred Hitchcock had done:

- In Meet the Feebles, Jackson appears as an audience member disguised as one of the aliens from Bad Taste.
- In Braindead, he is the mortician's assistant.
- In Heavenly Creatures, he is the tramp who gets kissed by Juliet Hulme.
- In The Frighteners, Jackson is a biker bumped into by Frank Bannister.
- In The Lord of the Rings: The Fellowship of the Ring, Jackson plays a carrot-chomping citizen of Bree when the four hobbits are entering the town.
- In The Lord of the Rings: The Two Towers, he plays a spear-throwing defender of Helm's Deep.
- In The Lord of the Rings: The Return of the King he is seen as the boatswain of a murderous corsair ship. This character is seen very briefly in the theatrical version. In the extended version he is onscreen for a longer period and is accidentally killed by Legolas's "warning shot". A detailed action figure of Jackson was made of this character in the same line as the rest of the Lord of the Rings toys.
  - Also in The Lord of the Rings: The Return of the King: during the scene of Shelob's Lair, Sam's hands (i.e. Jackson's) are seen entering the shot as Shelob is wrapping Frodo in cobweb. This was due to Sean Astin's temporary absence, and Jackson wanted to progress the production of the scene as much as possible, even without the actor.
- In his 2005 King Kong he appears as a biplane gunner attacking Kong in New York City, reprising the cameo that original King Kong filmmaker Merian C. Cooper made in the original 1933 film.
- In The Lovely Bones, he appears as a customer in a camera store playing with a camera.
- In The Hobbit: An Unexpected Journey, Jackson plays one of the dwarves escaping from Erebor after Smaug has attacked.
- In The Hobbit: The Desolation of Smaug, he reprises his The Lord of the Rings: The Fellowship of the Ring role as the carrot-chomping citizen of Bree.
- At the end of The Hobbit: The Battle of the Five Armies, when Bilbo Baggins restores the fallen portraits of his parents, Bungo Baggins and Belladonna Took, to the wall from which they had fallen or been removed, Jackson and Fran Walsh have cameos as Bungo and Belladonna, as the portraits were painted in their likeness. (Note: Jackson and Walsh point this out in the DVD commentary of the film's extended edition.)

Jackson also cameod in the opening sequence of Edgar Wright's 2007 film Hot Fuzz; he played a demented man dressed as Father Christmas who stabs Nicholas Angel (Simon Pegg) in the hand.

Jackson's son, Billy (born 1995), has made cameo appearances in almost every one of his father's films since his birth, namely The Frighteners, The Lord of the Rings film trilogy, King Kong, The Lovely Bones, and the third film of The Hobbit trilogy. His daughter, Katie (born 1996), appears in all the above films except The Frighteners. His partner Fran Walsh makes a short cameo in The Frighteners as a woman walking next to Cyrus and Stuar just prior the scene featuring their son Billy.

=== Other appearances ===
Jackson had a cameo on the HBO show Entourage on 5 August 2007 episode, "Gary's Desk", in which he offers a business proposal to Eric Murphy, manager to the lead character, Vincent Chase.

Jackson appears as himself in the 2013 Doctor Who-related short film The Five(ish) Doctors Reboot, alongside Sir Ian McKellen.

Jackson appears as himself in the 2019 episode "Dogfight Derby" of Savage Builds.

== Personal life ==
Jackson and his collaborator, Fran Walsh, a New Zealand screenwriter, film producer, and lyricist, have two children. Walsh has contributed to all of Jackson's films since 1989, as co-writer since Meet the Feebles, and as producer since The Lord of the Rings: The Fellowship of the Ring.

Jackson is an avid aviation enthusiast and owns a collection of over 40 airworthy World War I-era warbirds housed at Hood Aerodrome near Masterton, and a Gulfstream G650 in Wellington. Jackson also owns the main driving Chitty Chitty Bang Bang car that was built for the film Chitty Chitty Bang Bang. He is also interested in building scale models and owns a company that makes models of World War I aircraft. Wingnut Wings, his model making company, has stopped producing kits as of 2020; however, the future of the company is unknown.

As well as this, Omaka Aviation Heritage Centre presents the Knights of the Sky exhibition, featuring Jackson's own collection of WW1 aircraft and artifacts. This story of aviation in the Great War is told in sets created by WingNut Films and Wētā Workshop.

Jackson frequently appears barefoot in public, and has stated in an interview that "normally I don't wear shoes. They're just uncomfortable". He was also credited with "establishing New Zealand’s global barefoot reputation".

Jackson received some criticism during the 2019 Wellington City Council Elections, with his support for then-city councillor Andy Foster. Foster won the election against the incumbent mayor Justin Lester by 62 votes, with critics noting Jackson's public support and $30,000 of funding to Foster's election campaign being pivotal for Foster's victory. Both Jackson and Foster had criticised the previous city council's decision to support property development at Shelly Bay.

In 2025 Jackson and Walsh placed fifth on the NBR Rich List with an estimated net worth of $2.6b.

During 25th anniversary screenings of The Fellowship of the Ring in 2026, Jackson opened up on his reasons for not making any narrative film since 2014's The Battle of the Five Armies, mentioning that the death in 2015 of his close friend and cinematographer Andrew Lesnie, whom, being an only child, he saw as a brother. He stated his belief that, although originally subconscious, his grief led him to make documentaries using pre-existing footage (They Shall Not Grow Old and The Beatles: Get Back) rather than having to film with another cinematographer.

== Awards and honours ==
=== Awards and nominations ===
Year	Award	Category	Title	Result
1995	Academy Awards	Best Original Screenplay	Heavenly Creatures	Nominated
2002	Academy Awards	Best Picture	The Lord of the Rings: The Fellowship of the Ring	Nominated
2002	Academy Awards	Best Director	The Lord of the Rings: The Fellowship of the Ring	Nominated
2002	Academy Awards	Best Adapted Screenplay	The Lord of the Rings: The Fellowship of the Ring	Nominated
2003	Academy Awards	Best Picture	The Lord of the Rings: The Two Towers	Nominated
2004	Academy Awards	Best Picture	The Lord of the Rings: The Return of the King	Won
2004	Academy Awards	Best Director	The Lord of the Rings: The Return of the King	Won
2004	Academy Awards	Best Adapted Screenplay	The Lord of the Rings: The Return of the King	Won
2010	Academy Awards	Best Picture	District 9	Nominated
1994	Australian Film Institute Awards	Best Foreign Film	Heavenly Creatures	Nominated
2001	Australian Film Institute Awards	Best Foreign Film	The Lord of the Rings: The Fellowship of the Ring	Won
2002	Australian Film Institute Awards	Best Foreign Film	The Lord of the Rings: The Two Towers	Won
2003	Australian Film Institute Awards	Best Foreign Film	The Lord of the Rings: The Return of the King	Won
2001	British Academy Film Awards	Best Film	The Lord of the Rings: The Fellowship of the Ring	Won
2001	British Academy Film Awards	Best Direction	The Lord of the Rings: The Fellowship of the Ring	Won
2001	British Academy Film Awards	Best Adapted Screenplay	The Lord of the Rings: The Fellowship of the Ring	Nominated
2002	British Academy Film Awards	Best Film	The Lord of the Rings: The Two Towers	Nominated
2002	British Academy Film Awards	Best Direction	The Lord of the Rings: The Two Towers	Nominated
2003	British Academy Film Awards	Best Film	The Lord of the Rings: The Return of the King	Won
2003	British Academy Film Awards	Best Direction	The Lord of the Rings: The Return of the King	Nominated
2003	British Academy Film Awards	Best Adapted Screenplay	The Lord of the Rings: The Return of the King	Won
2018	British Academy Film Awards	Best Documentary	They Shall Not Grow Old	Nominated
2001	Critics' Choice Awards	Best Director	The Lord of the Rings: The Fellowship of the Ring	Nominated
2003	Critics' Choice Awards	Best Director	The Lord of the Rings: The Return of the King	Won
2005	Critics' Choice Awards	Best Director	King Kong	Nominated
2001	Directors Guild of America Awards	Outstanding Directing – Motion Pictures	The Lord of the Rings: The Fellowship of the Ring	Nominated
2002	Directors Guild of America Awards	Outstanding Directing – Motion Pictures	The Lord of the Rings: The Two Towers	Nominated
2003	Directors Guild of America Awards	Outstanding Directing – Motion Pictures	The Lord of the Rings: The Return of the King	Won
2001	Empire Awards	Best Director	The Lord of the Rings: The Fellowship of the Ring	Nominated
2002	Empire Awards	Best Director	The Lord of the Rings: The Two Towers	Nominated
2003	Empire Awards	Best Director	The Lord of the Rings: The Return of the King	Nominated
2005	Empire Awards	Best Director	King Kong	Nominated
2012	Empire Awards	Best Director	The Hobbit: An Unexpected Journey	Nominated
2013	Empire Awards	Best Director	The Hobbit: The Desolation of Smaug	Nominated
2014	Empire Awards	Best Director	The Hobbit: The Battle of the Five Armies	Nominated
2002	Golden Globe Awards	Best Motion Picture – Drama	The Lord of the Rings: The Fellowship of the Ring	Nominated
2002	Golden Globe Awards	Best Director	The Lord of the Rings: The Fellowship of the Ring	Nominated
2003	Golden Globe Awards	Best Motion Picture – Drama	The Lord of the Rings: The Two Towers	Nominated
2003	Golden Globe Awards	Best Director	The Lord of the Rings: The Two Towers	Nominated
2004	Golden Globe Awards	Best Motion Picture – Drama	The Lord of the Rings: The Return of the King	Won
2004	Golden Globe Awards	Best Director	The Lord of the Rings: The Return of the King	Won
2006	Golden Globe Awards	Best Director	King Kong	Nominated
1993	New Zealand Film and TV Awards	Best Director – Film	Braindead	Won
1993	New Zealand Film and TV Awards	Best Screenplay – Film	Braindead	Won
1995	New Zealand Film and TV Awards	Best Director – Film	Heavenly Creatures	Won
2026	Palme d'Or	Honorary Palme d'Or		Won
2022	Primetime Creative Arts Emmy Awards	Outstanding Documentary or Nonfiction Series	The Beatles: Get Back	Won
2022	Primetime Creative Arts Emmy Awards	Outstanding Directing for a Documentary/Nonfiction Program	The Beatles: Get Back (for "Part 3: Days 17–22")	Won
2001	Producers Guild of America Awards	Outstanding Producer of Theatrical Motion Picture	The Lord of the Rings: The Fellowship of the Ring	Nominated
2002	Producers Guild of America Awards	Outstanding Producer of Theatrical Motion Picture	The Lord of the Rings: The Two Towers	Nominated
2003	Producers Guild of America Awards	Outstanding Producer of Theatrical Motion Picture	The Lord of the Rings: The Return of the King	Won
2009	Producers Guild of America Awards	Outstanding Producer of Theatrical Motion Picture	District 9	Nominated
2011	Producers Guild of America Awards	Outstanding Producer of Animated Theatrical Motion Picture	The Adventures of Tintin: The Secret of the Unicorn	Won
2021	Producers Guild of America Awards	Outstanding Producer of Non-Fiction Television	The Beatles: Get Back	Won
2004	Santa Barbara International Film Festival	Maltin Modern Master Award		Won
1997	Saturn Awards	Best Director	The Frighteners	Nominated
1997	Saturn Awards	Best Writing	The Frighteners	Nominated
2001	Saturn Awards	Best Director	The Lord of the Rings: The Fellowship of the Ring	Won
2001	Saturn Awards	Best Writing	The Lord of the Rings: The Fellowship of the Ring	Nominated
2002	Saturn Awards	Best Director	The Lord of the Rings: The Two Towers	Nominated
2002	Saturn Awards	Best Writing	The Lord of the Rings: The Two Towers	Nominated
2003	Saturn Awards	Best Director	The Lord of the Rings: The Return of the King	Won
2003	Saturn Awards	Best Writing	The Lord of the Rings: The Return of the King	Won
2005	Saturn Awards	Best Director	King Kong	Won
2005	Saturn Awards	Best Writing	King Kong	Nominated
2012	Saturn Awards	Best Director	The Hobbit: An Unexpected Journey	Nominated
2013	Saturn Awards	Best Director	The Hobbit: The Desolation of Smaug	Nominated
2013	Saturn Awards	Best Writing	The Hobbit: The Desolation of Smaug	Nominated
2014	Saturn Awards	Best Writing	The Hobbit: The Battle of the Five Armies	Nominated
2021	Visual Effects Society	Lifetime Achievement Award		Won
1994	Writers Guild of America Awards	Best Original Screenplay	Heavenly Creatures	Nominated
2001	Writers Guild of America Awards	Best Adapted Screenplay	The Lord of the Rings: The Fellowship of the Ring	Nominated
2003	Writers Guild of America Awards	Best Adapted Screenplay	The Lord of the Rings: The Return of the King	Nominated

=== As director ===
Since 1994's Heavenly Creatures Peter Jackson's films have enjoyed success in the annual awards season, earning many nominations and winning several awards; The Frighteners being his only fictional directed effort since 1994 not to be nominated for an Academy Award. The Lord of the Rings trilogy is one of the most successful trilogies of all time in terms of awards, winning more Academy Awards than the Francis Ford Coppola directed Godfather Trilogy, with 2003's The Return of the King winning in all 11 categories for which it was nominated including Best Picture, Director and Adapted Screenplay. Jackson's films have fared extremely well in the technical categories as well as the major categories; all three Lord of the Rings pictures as well as King Kong won the Academy Award for Best Visual Effects in their respective years. In total Jackson's directed efforts have been the most awarded films at three separate Academy Award ceremonies, the 74th, 76th, and 78th.

Year	Film	Academy Award Nominations	Academy Award Wins	Golden Globe Nominations	Golden Globe Wins	BAFTA Nominations	BAFTA Wins
1994	Heavenly Creatures	1					
2001	The Lord of the Rings: The Fellowship of the Ring	13	4	4		13	5
2002	The Lord of the Rings: The Two Towers	6	2	2		10	3
2003	The Lord of the Rings: The Return of the King	11	11	4	4	12	5
2005	King Kong	4	3	2		3	1
2009	The Lovely Bones	1		1		2	
2012	The Hobbit: An Unexpected Journey	3				3	
2013	The Hobbit: The Desolation of Smaug	3				2	
2014	The Hobbit: The Battle of the Five Armies	1				1	
2018	They Shall Not Grow Old (Note: Because its release date did not match their deadlines, They Shall Not Grow Old was ineligible for the Academy Awards; the Golden Globe Awards do not reward documentaries.)	—N/a	—N/a	—N/a	—N/a	1	
Total		43	20	13	4	47	14

=== Honours ===
In the 2002 New Year Honours, Jackson was appointed a Companion of the New Zealand Order of Merit (CNZM), for services to film. In the 2010 New Year Honours, he was promoted to Knight Companion of the New Zealand Order of Merit (KNZM), also for services to film. The investiture ceremony took place at Premier House in Wellington on 28 April 2010.

In 2006, Jackson received the Golden Plate Award of the American Academy of Achievement. His Golden Plate was presented by Awards Council member Steven Spielberg.

In the 2012 Queen's Birthday and Diamond Jubilee Honours, Jackson was awarded New Zealand's highest civilian honour as Additional Member of the Order of New Zealand (ONZ), this for services to New Zealand.

In 2016, Jackson was inducted into the New Zealand Business Hall of Fame.

== Filmography ==
=== Feature films ===
Year	Title	Director	Writer	Producer	Notes
1987	Bad Taste	Yes	Yes	Yes	Also editor, cinematographer, makeup effects supervisor and special effects supervisor
1989	Meet the Feebles	Yes	Yes	Yes	Also camera operator and puppet maker
1992	Braindead	Yes	Yes	No	Also stop motion animator
1994	Heavenly Creatures	Yes	Yes	Yes	Co-written with Fran Walsh
1995	Forgotten Silver	Yes	Yes	No	Co-written & directed with Costa Botes
1996	Jack Brown Genius	2nd unit	Yes	Yes	Co-written with Tony Hiles and Fran Walsh
1996	The Frighteners	Yes	Yes	Yes	Co-written with Fran Walsh
2001	The Lord of the Rings: The Fellowship of the Ring	Yes	Yes	Yes	Co-written with Fran Walsh and Philippa Boyens
2002	The Lord of the Rings: The Two Towers	Yes	Yes	Yes	Co-written with Fran Walsh, Philippa Boyens, and Stephen Sinclair
2003	The Lord of the Rings: The Return of the King	Yes	Yes	Yes	Co-written with Fran Walsh and Philippa Boyens
2005	King Kong	Yes	Yes	Yes	Co-written with Fran Walsh and Philippa Boyens
2009	The Lovely Bones	Yes	Yes	Yes	Co-written with Fran Walsh and Philippa Boyens
2012	The Hobbit: An Unexpected Journey	Yes	Yes	Yes	Co-written with Fran Walsh, Philippa Boyens, and Guillermo del Toro
2013	The Hobbit: The Desolation of Smaug	Yes	Yes	Yes	Co-written with Fran Walsh, Philippa Boyens, and Guillermo del Toro
2014	The Hobbit: The Battle of the Five Armies	Yes	Yes	Yes	Co-written with Fran Walsh, Philippa Boyens, and Guillermo del Toro
2018	Mortal Engines	No	Yes	Yes	Co-written with Fran Walsh and Philippa Boyens

Producer only

Year	Title	Notes
2009	District 9	
2011	The Adventures of Tintin	Also 2nd unit director
2027	The Lord of the Rings: The Hunt for Gollum †	Post-production

Executive producer only

Year	Title	Notes
2024	The Lord of the Rings: The War of the Rohirrim	

Acting roles

Year	Title	Role	Notes
1976	The Valley	Prospector #4	
1987	Bad Taste	Derek and Robert	
1989	Meet the Feebles	Audience Member in the Theater wearing "Bad Taste" Mask	Uncredited
1989	Worzel Gummidge Down Under	Speaking role playing as Jock	Also worked on special effects
1992	Braindead	Undertaker's assistant	Uncredited
1994	Heavenly Creatures	Bum outside theater	Uncredited
1995	Forgotten Silver	Himself	
1996	The Frighteners	Man with piercings	Uncredited
2001	The Lord of the Rings: The Fellowship of the Ring	Albert Dreary eating carrot / portrait of Bungo Baggins	Uncredited
2002	The Lord of the Rings: The Two Towers	Rohan warrior throwing spear at the gate of Helms Deep	Uncredited
2003	Boogans	Himself	Uncredited
2003	The Long and Short of It	Bus driver	Uncredited
2003	The Lord of the Rings: The Return of the King	Pirate being shot by Legolas at Umbar	Uncredited
2005	King Kong	Gunner	Uncredited
2007	Hot Fuzz	Thief dressed as Father Christmas	Uncredited
2009	The Lovely Bones	Man at pharmacy	Uncredited
2012	The Hobbit: An Unexpected Journey	Dwarf fleeing from Smaug	Uncredited
2013	The Five(ish) Doctors Reboot	Himself	
2013	The Hobbit: The Desolation of Smaug	Albert Dreary eating carrot	Uncredited
2014	The Hobbit: The Battle of the Five Armies	Painting of Bungo Baggins	Uncredited
2018	Mortal Engines	Sooty Pete	Uncredited

=== Short film ===
Year	Title	Director	Writer	Producer	Notes
1976	The Valley	Yes	Yes	Yes	Also cinematographer, editor, makeup designer, costume designer and special effects supervisor
1992	Valley of the Stereos	No	No	Yes	
2003	The Long and Short of It	No	No	Executive	
2008	Crossing the Line	Yes	Yes	No	

=== Documentary film ===
Year	Title	Director	Producer	Writer	Notes
2008	Over the Front: The Great War in the Air	Yes	Yes	Yes	Documentary short
2012	West of Memphis	No	Yes	No	
2018	They Shall Not Grow Old	Yes	Yes	No	
2022	The Beatles: Get Back – The Rooftop Concert	Yes	Yes	No	

=== Television ===
Year	Title	Director	Producer	Notes
2021	The Beatles: Get Back	Yes	Yes	3 episodes; documentary series

Acting roles

Year	Title	Role	Episode	Notes
2007	Entourage	Himself	"Gary's Desk"	
2023	The Muppets Mayhem	Himself	"Track 7: Eight Days a Week"	Uncredited cameo; Notably, this cameo implies that Meet the Feebles is in some way canon to the Muppets, as Floyd notes about when they "met the Feebles". Jackson replies by saying that "2 of the Feebles are in witness protection and the rest are in prison".
2023	The Simpsons	Himself	"Thirst Trap: A Corporate Love Story"	Voice role

=== Music video ===
Year	Artist	Title
2023	The Beatles	"Now and Then"

== See also ==
- Peter Jackson's unrealized projects
- Cinema of New Zealand
- List of New Zealand Academy Award winners and nominees
- List of New Zealand film makers
- List of barefooters
- Park Road Post

== Sources ==
- Lee, C. (2004). Lord of Misrule: The autobiography of Christopher Lee. Jackson, P. (contributor). Orion Books. ISBN 9780752859330.
- Rinzler, J.W. (2007). The Making of Star Wars. The definitive story behind the original film. Jackson, P. (contributor). Ebury. ISBN 9780091920142.
- Rinzler, J.W. (2019). The Art of Rick Baker. Jackson, P. (contributor). Cameron Books. ISBN 9781944903435.

== Bibliography ==
- Bordoni, Andrea & Matteo Marino (2002). Peter Jackson. Milan, ITA: Il Castoro. ISBN 9788880332251. (in Italian)
- Sibley, Brian (2006). Peter Jackson: A Film-maker's Journey. Sydney, AUS: HarperCollins. ISBN 0732285623.
