= The Hobbit: The Battle of the Five Armies =

2014 film directed by Peter Jackson

- Theatrical release poster
- Directed by: Peter Jackson
- Screenplay by: Fran Walsh; Philippa Boyens; Peter Jackson; Guillermo del Toro
- Based on: The Hobbit by J. R. R. Tolkien
- Produced by: Carolynne Cunningham; Zane Weiner; Fran Walsh; Peter Jackson
- Starring: Ian McKellen; Martin Freeman; Richard Armitage; Evangeline Lilly; Lee Pace; Luke Evans; Benedict Cumberbatch; Ken Stott; James Nesbitt; Cate Blanchett; Ian Holm; Christopher Lee; Hugo Weaving; Orlando Bloom
- Cinematography: Andrew Lesnie
- Edited by: Jabez Olssen
- Music by: Howard Shore
- Production companies: New Line Cinema; Metro-Goldwyn-Mayer Pictures; WingNut Films
- Distributed by: Warner Bros. Pictures
- Release dates: 1 December 2014 (London premiere); 11 December 2014 (New Zealand); 17 December 2014 (United States)
- Running time: 144 minutes
- Countries: New Zealand; United States
- Language: English
- Budget: $209–300 million
- Box office: $962.7 million

The Hobbit: The Battle of the Five Armies is a 2014 epic fantasy film directed by Peter Jackson from a screenplay by Fran Walsh, Philippa Boyens, Jackson, and Guillermo del Toro. It is based on the 1937 novel The Hobbit by J. R. R. Tolkien. The sequel to 2013's The Hobbit: The Desolation of Smaug, the film is the final instalment in The Hobbit trilogy, acting as a prequel to Jackson's The Lord of the Rings trilogy (2001–2003). The film's story concludes the adventure of the hobbit Bilbo Baggins and Thorin Oakenshield's company of dwarves, who take possession of the treasure within the Lonely Mountain as factions of dwarves, elves and men clash over it, while the orc Azog the Defiler and his forces make their move upon them.

The film stars Martin Freeman, Ian McKellen, Richard Armitage, Evangeline Lilly, Luke Evans, Lee Pace, Benedict Cumberbatch, Ken Stott, Aidan Turner, Dean O'Gorman, Billy Connolly, Graham McTavish, James Nesbitt, Stephen Fry, and Ryan Gage. The ensemble cast also features Cate Blanchett, Ian Holm, Christopher Lee, Hugo Weaving, and Orlando Bloom.

The Hobbit: The Battle of the Five Armies premiered in London on 1 December 2014, and was released on 11 December in New Zealand and on 17 December in the United States, by Warner Bros. Pictures. The film received mixed reviews from critics and grossed $962.2 million worldwide, making it the second-highest-grossing film of 2014. It received numerous accolades, including being nominated for Best Sound Editing at the 87th Academy Awards.

== Plot ==
Bilbo and the Dwarves watch from the Lonely Mountain as the dragon Smaug sets Laketown ablaze. Bard breaks out of prison and kills Smaug with the black arrow. Smaug's falling body crushes the Master of Laketown and his cronies, who were escaping on a boat with the town's gold. Bard becomes the new leader of Laketown and guides its people to seek refuge in the ruins of Dale. Thorin, now possessing the vast treasure in the mountain, searches obsessively for the Arkenstone, which Bilbo had previously found but kept hidden. (Note: As depicted in The Hobbit: The Desolation of Smaug (2013)) Upon hearing that Laketown survivors have fled to Dale, he orders the entrance of the Lonely Mountain sealed off.

Meanwhile, Galadriel, Elrond, and Saruman arrive at Dol Guldur and free Gandalf, sending him to safety with Radagast. They battle and defeat the Nazgûl and then face a formless Sauron, whom Galadriel banishes to the East. Azog, marching on Erebor with his vast Orc army, sends his son Bolg to Mount Gundabad to summon their second army. Legolas and Tauriel witness the march of Bolg's army, bolstered by Orc berserkers and giant bats.

Thranduil and an Elf army arrive in Dale to reclaim treasure held by Dwarf king Thrór. To avoid war, Bard attempts to negotiate with Thorin, asking him to share the gold previously promised to Laketown, but Thorin refuses. That night, Gandalf arrives to warn Bard and Thranduil of Azog's army, but Thranduil dismisses him. Bilbo sneaks the Arkenstone out of Erebor and gives it to Thranduil and Bard to trade for treasures and prevent war.

The next morning, a combined army of Elves and Lake-town men approaches the Lonely Mountain, and Thranduil and Bard reveal that they have the Arkenstone. Thorin believes it to be a ruse, but Bilbo reveals the truth, at the same time reprimanding Thorin for his greed. Thorin nearly kills Bilbo but is stopped by Gandalf. Thorin's cousin, Dáin arrives with his Dwarf army, and a battle looms until Azog's forces arrive. As Dáin leads his forces to face the Orcs, Gandalf convinces Thranduil to join forces against Azog's army. Azog splits his army, sending some of his forces to attack Dale, so Bard and Lake-town army return to the city to defend it.

Inside Erebor, Thorin, realising his greed and selfishness, regains his sanity and leads his company to join the battle. He rides with Dwalin, Fíli, and Kíli to Ravenhill to kill Azog. Meanwhile, Tauriel and Legolas arrive to warn the Dwarves of Bolg's arrival, and Bilbo volunteers to relay the news to Thorin, using his magic ring to move through the combat unseen. Azog kills Fíli as Bilbo and the other Dwarves are forced to watch. Bolg overpowers Tauriel and kills Kíli, who has come to her aid. Legolas battles Bolg and eventually kills him. The Great Eagles arrive with Radagast and Beorn, and the Orcs are finally defeated. In the climax, Thorin engages Azog in a duel and kills him, but is fatally wounded. Bilbo reconciles with the dying Thorin, while Tauriel mourns Kíli. Thranduil advises Legolas to seek out a ranger in the north who goes by the name Strider.

Thorin's company settles back into Erebor with Dáin as their new king. Bilbo bids farewell to the company's remaining members and journeys home to the Shire with Gandalf. As the two part ways on the outskirts of the Shire, Gandalf admits his knowledge of Bilbo's magic ring and warns him of it, although Bilbo assures him that he had lost the ring. Bilbo returns to Bag End to find his belongings being auctioned off because he was presumed dead. He stops the sale and tidies up his home, revealing he still possesses the ring. Sixty years later, Bilbo happily receives a visit from Gandalf on his 111th birthday. (Note: As depicted in The Lord of the Rings: The Fellowship of the Ring (2001))

== Cast ==
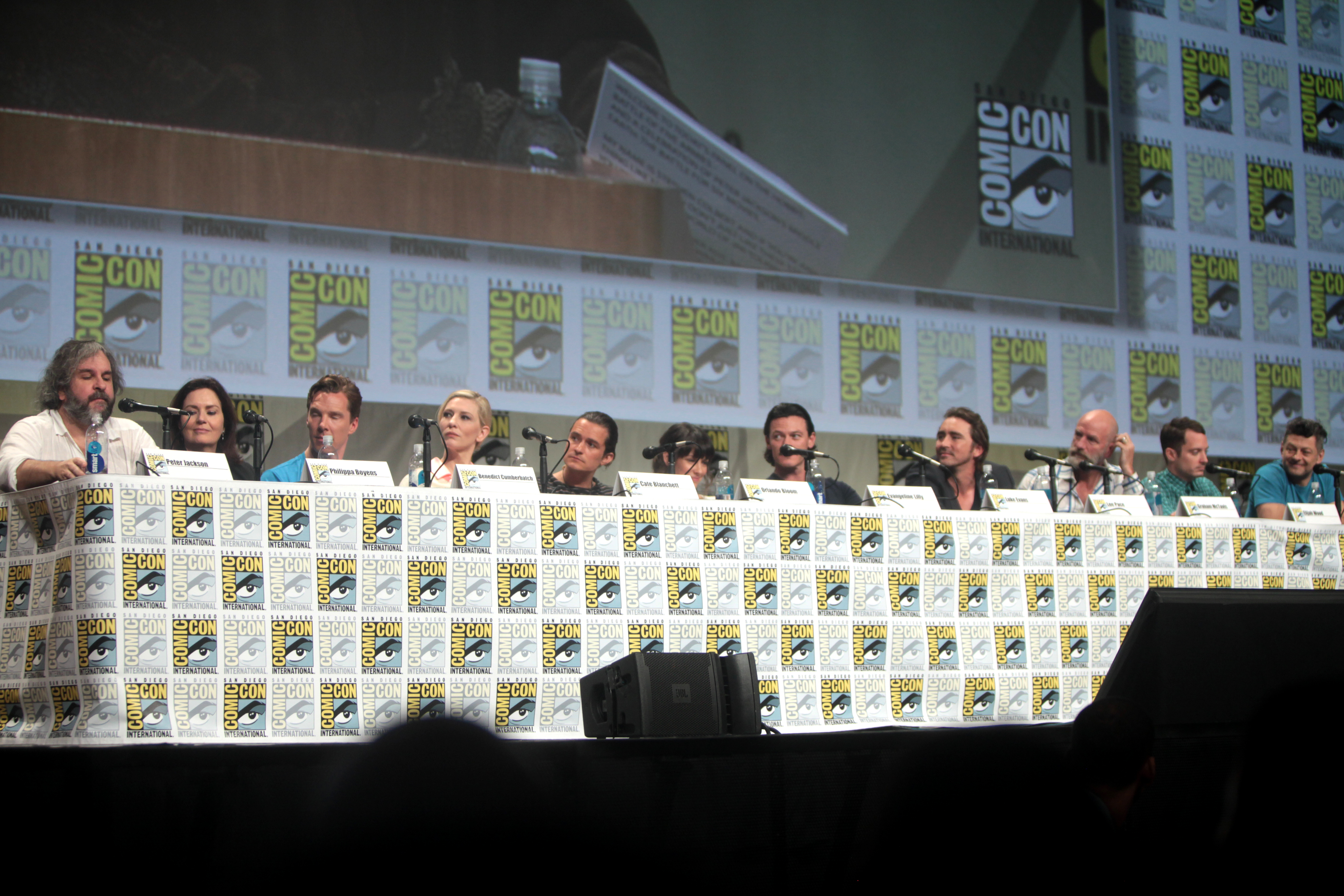
The Battle of the Five Armies panel at 2014 SDCC

- Martin Freeman as Bilbo Baggins
  - Ian Holm as Old Bilbo Baggins
- Ian McKellen as Gandalf the Grey
- Richard Armitage as Thorin II Oakenshield
- Orlando Bloom as Legolas
- Evangeline Lilly as Tauriel
- Luke Evans as Bard the Bowman
- Benedict Cumberbatch as Smaug / Sauron
- Lee Pace as Thranduil
- Graham McTavish as Dwalin
- Ken Stott as Balin
- Aidan Turner as Kíli
- Dean O'Gorman as Fíli
- Manu Bennett as Azog the Defiler
- Mark Hadlow as Dori
- Jed Brophy as Nori
- Adam Brown as Ori
- John Callen as Óin
- Peter Hambleton as Glóin
- William Kircher as Bifur
- James Nesbitt as Bofur
- Stephen Hunter as Bombur
- Cate Blanchett as Galadriel
- Hugo Weaving as Elrond
- Christopher Lee as Saruman the White
- Sylvester McCoy as Radagast the Brown
- John Tui as Bolg
- Billy Connolly as Dáin II Ironfoot
- Mikael Persbrandt as Beorn
- Stephen Fry as Master of Lake-town
- Ryan Gage as Alfrid Lickspittle
- Mark Mitchinson as Braga
- John Bell as Bain
- Peggy and Mary Nesbitt as Sigrid and Tilda
- Simon London as Feren

Additionally, Peter Jackson's and Andy Serkis's daughters made cameo appearances as girls rowing away during Smaug's attack; movement coach Terry Notary and stand-in Jamie Haugh appear as Laketown refugees after the destruction; Conan Stevens, who was to play Bolg, appears as the Keeper of the Dungeons, an Orc captain holding Gandalf hostage; and the sons of key second assistant director Guy Campbell, casting director Miranda Rivers, and Weta Workshop founder Richard Taylor appear as Hobbit children during the auction scene.

== Production ==
=== Development ===
The Hobbit was originally planned as a two-part film, but Jackson confirmed plans for a third film on 30 July 2012, turning his adaptation of The Hobbit into a trilogy. According to Jackson, the third film would contain the Battle of the Five Armies and make extensive use of the appendices that Tolkien wrote to expand the story of Middle-earth (published in the back of The Return of the King). Jackson also stated that while the third film would largely make use of footage originally shot for the first and second films, it would require additional filming as well. The third film was titled There and Back Again in August 2012. In April 2014, Jackson changed the title of the film to The Battle of the Five Armies as he thought the new title better suited the situation of the film. He stated that, had he adapted The Hobbit as a two-part film, the original title may have felt right for the second part which would have included both Bilbo's arrival in Erebor and departure, but after the decision to adapt the novel as a three-part film, it felt misplaced as Bilbo had already arrived at Erebor in the second part. Shaun Gunner, the chairman of The Tolkien Society, supported the decision: "The Battle of the Five Armies much better captures the focus of the film but also more accurately channels the essence of the story."

=== Score ===
As with all the previous films, Howard Shore composed the score. Conrad Pope (who conducted the orchestra) and James Sizemore orchestrated the music for the New Zealand Symphony Orchestra and for two Gamelan orchestra, while the London Voices and Tiffin boys’ choir were recorded in AIR Lyndhurst, London. The score featured a few new themes for Dain, Gundabad (featuring a "chorus" of didgeridoos) and the Dwarves' war preparations, but focused more on blending and clashing the themes against one another, eventually bringing the themes to a resolution.

Billy Boyd, who played Peregrin Took in The Lord of the Rings, wrote and recorded the song "The Last Goodbye" for the end credits of the film.

== Distribution ==
=== Marketing ===
A teaser trailer for the film was released on 28 July 2014 attached to Guardians of the Galaxy, Into the Storm, and If I Stay. The second theatrical trailer was released on 6 November 2014 attached to Interstellar and The Hunger Games: Mockingjay – Part 1. To promote the film's release, Wellington-based association football club, Wellington Phoenix, wore a special designed jersey to commemorate the opening of The Hobbit: The Battle of Five Armies. The custom, film-themed jersey was worn only once, on 13 December 2014. In the film's Japanese release on 13 December, Warner Bros. collaborated with mobile gaming company A-Lim to bring Bilbo, Gandalf, and Legolas into the game Brave Frontier at the end of December as Vortex Dungeon units. The campaign only ran until February 2015. Smaug made a guest appearance, animated by WETA and voiced again by Cumberbatch, on the satire show The Colbert Report on 12 December 2014 to promote the film.

=== Video games ===
Two video games were developed to coincide with the theatrical release. A tie-in fighting video game The Hobbit: Battle of the Five Armies – Fight for Middle Earth was released simultaneously with the film for Android and iOS platforms to negative reviews from critics and users. An action-adventure video game Middle-earth: Shadow of Mordor was released for Microsoft Windows, PlayStation 4 & Xbox One in October 2014 and for PlayStation 3 and Xbox 360 on 21 November, nearly a week prior to the world premiere in London, on 1 December. The events of the game take place directly after Sauron fled to Mordor, escaping The White Council, which was shown at the beginning. The game was planned to act as an overlap between The Hobbit and The Lord of the Rings film series.

=== Theatrical release ===
Initially the film was set for a 18 July 2014 release; however, it was later pushed back to 17 December. The world premiere of The Hobbit: The Battle of the Five Armies was held in London at Leicester Square on 1 December 2014. The film opened in cinemas on 11 December 2014 in New Zealand, on 12 December in the United Kingdom and on 17 December in the United States. Warner Bros released the film on 18 December in Greece and 26 December, in Australia. The film was released in China on 23 January 2015. An extended edition of the film had a one-night-only re-release on 13 October 2015, accompanied by a special greeting from Peter Jackson.

=== Home media ===
The Hobbit: The Battle of the Five Armies was released on 6 March 2015 on Digital Release from digital retailers. The DVD and Blu-ray were released on 24 March 2015 in the United States. It topped the home video sales chart in its opening week. The film earned a revenue of $70.3 million with 3.4 million copies sold, making it the ninth best-selling title of 2015. An Extended Edition of the film, with 20 minutes of additional footage and original music was released on Digital HD on 20 October and on DVD, Blu-ray, and Blu-ray 3D on 17 November 2015 in the United States and on 23 November 2015, in the United Kingdom.

The Battle of the Five Armies was released in Ultra HD Blu-ray on 30 November 2020 in the United Kingdom and on 1 December 2020 in the United States, along with the other films of the trilogy, including both the theatrical and the extended editions of the films.

==== Rating ====
Unlike the theatrical version's PG-13 rating, the Extended Edition was rated R by the MPAA for "some violence", which makes it the only Middle Earth film to have a restricted rating and, one of the few films based on a children's book to have an R rating. The Australian Classification Board gave it the restricted MA15+ rating for "strong fantasy violence", and the BBFC granted a 15 certificate for "strong violence", the only Middle Earth film with such ratings.

== Reception ==
=== Box office ===
Like its predecessors, The Hobbit: The Battle of the Five Armies became a financial success. It has grossed a total of $255.1 million in the US and Canada and $707.1 million in other countries for a worldwide total of $962.2 million. In its original theatrical release, it grossed over $956 million, becoming the second-highest-grossing film of 2014 (behind Transformers: Age of Extinction). Deadline Hollywood calculated the film's net profit as $103.4 million, accounting for production budgets, marketing, talent participations, and other costs; box office grosses and home media revenues placed it fourteenth on their list of 2014's "Most Valuable Blockbusters". The film failed to earn $1 billion at the box office, despite various pundits projecting it to reach that milestone. The Hollywood Reporter said that The Battle of the Five Armies was unlikely to gross $1 billion worldwide due to "plunging exchange rates around the globe" witnessed that year, and that Warner Bros. and MGM ultimately would take in nearly $90 million less than expected due to the rising dollar and plunging foreign currencies. Despite this, Forbes declared the trilogy "an unmitigated financial grand-slam for all parties".

==== United States and Canada ====
In the US and Canada, the film is the lowest-grossing of the three films of The Hobbit trilogy, and also the lowest-grossing of the six Middle-earth adaptations, but the sixth-highest-grossing film of 2014. It opened on 16 December 2014 across 3,100 theatres and widened to 3,875 the following day. It earned $11.2 million from Tuesday late-night shows, which is the second-highest of 2014, matching the numbers earned by Guardians of the Galaxy and both behind The Hunger Games: Mockingjay – Part 1 ($17 million) of which $2.5 million of just over 22% came from IMAX showings. This broke the record for a Middle-Earth adaptation preview previously set by The Desolation of Smaug with $8.8 million. It then topped the box office on its opening day (Wednesday, 17 December 2014), earning $24.5 million (including previews), which is the third-highest Middle-Earth adaptation Wednesday opening behind the Wednesday openings of The Lord of the Rings: The Return of the King ($34.5 million) and The Lord of the Rings: The Two Towers ($26.2 million). In total, the film earned $57.4 million in its traditional three-day opening and $89.1 million over its five-day course making it the second-biggest five-day opening in The Hobbit franchise, beating the $86.1 million opening of The Desolation of Smaug, but still behind An Unexpected Journey's $100.2 million five-day opening. However, on a three-day basis, the film under-performed expectations and fell short of its predecessors. The film set a December IMAX opening record with $13.4 million (previously held by Mission: Impossible – Ghost Protocol). 3‑D accounted for 49% of the total gross while IMAX generated 15% or $13.4 million over five days, and $7.4 million over three days, and premium large-format screens comprised 8% of the total opening-weekend gross with $7.2 million from 396 theatres. The film passed the $100 million mark on its seventh day (23 December 2014). It became the third film of 2014 to earn $100 million in just under a week following Lionsgate's The Hunger Games: Mockingjay – Part 1 ($168.7 million in its opening week) and Disney/Marvel's Guardians of the Galaxy ($134.4 million in its first week). It was in first place at the US and Canadian box office for three consecutive weekends despite facing competition from numerous releases each weekend, but was finally overtaken by Taken 3 in its fourth weekend.

==== Other countries ====
The film began its international roll-out a week prior to its wide North American release. It opened on 10 December 2014 in 11 European markets, earning $11.3 million and 11 December 2014 in 17 additional markets, earning $13.7 million, for a two-day total of $26.6 million and topped the charts in each of the territories. Through 14 December 2015, it had an opening weekend total of $122.2 million from 37 countries in 15,395 screens, topping the box office and outperforming the previous two instalments on a local currency and admissions basis. Seventy-one per cent of the total gross ($86.7 million) came from 3‑D showings. However, the opening weekend was still lower than the openings of An Unexpected Journey ($138 million) and The Desolation of Smaug ($135.4 million) — both on a dollar basis. It set a December IMAX opening record with $6.4 million across 160 IMAX screens, previously held by An Unexpected Journey with $5.03 million. The film opened to an additional 59 countries in its second weekend and earned $109 million from 19,315 screens still holding the top spot and fell gradually by 13% as a result of facing minor competitions. In its third weekend, the film added a further $89 million, remaining at number one. It was in first place at the box office outside North America for four consecutive and five weekends in total.

The film achieved numerous records during its opening weekend. It set an all-time Warner Bros. opening record in Russia ($13.8 million), Argentina ($2.1 million), Sweden, and Finland. It also set a 2014 opening record in Germany ($20.5 million), France ($15.1 million), and Spain ($6.3 million). It also had the best Middle-earth saga opening in the UK ($15.2 million), and Mexico ($6.3 million). In Brazil, the film scored the second-biggest Warner Bros. opening of all time with $6.8 million (behind Harry Potter and the Deathly Hallows – Part 2). In Australia, the film was released on 26 December 2014 and set an opening-day record with $5.6 million, behind Harry Potter and the Deathly Hallows – Part 2 ($7.092 million), The Avengers ($6.0 million), and The Hobbit: The Desolation of Smaug ($5.9 million). It went on to earn $10.1 million in its opening weekend. The film set an all-time opening record for Warner Bros. in China where it earned $49.8 million in its opening weekend (a record previously held by Pacific Rim). IMAX generated $6.8 million of the total gross, which was once the second-highest IMAX three-day gross behind Transformers: Age of Extinction's $10 million. Other high openings were recorded in Korea ($10.4 million), Poland ($5.6 million), Italy ($5.6 million), Malaysia ($3 million), and Taiwan ($2.8 million). In total earnings, its largest markets are China ($121.7 million), the UK, Ireland & Malta ($61.3 million), and Australia ($27 million).

=== Critical response ===
MTV reported that early reviews for The Hobbit: The Battle of the Five Armies were "generally positive" with critics praising "its energy, shorter running time and satisfying closure". According to IBT, reviews were mostly positive, with critics "praising director Peter Jackson's effort at transforming J. R. R. Tolkien's fantasy novel into an epic adventure film trilogy". According to CBS News, critics said the film "will satisfy fans" but "otherwise, it may be worth waiting until it's available to rent". Oliver Gettel of the Los Angeles Times said the critical consensus was that the film is "a flawed but fitting finale to The Hobbit trilogy". On review aggregator website Rotten Tomatoes, the film has a 59% approval rating based on 265 reviews, with an average rating of 6.30/10. Its consensus reads "Though somewhat overwhelmed by its own spectacle, The Hobbit: The Battle of the Five Armies ends Peter Jackson's second Middle-earth trilogy on a reasonably satisfying note". On Metacritic, the film holds an average score of 59 out of 100 based on 46 critics. Audiences polled by CinemaScore, during the opening weekend, gave the film an average grade of "A−" on an A+ to F scale, the same score as its predecessor.

Scott Foundas of Variety said "The result is at once the trilogy's most engrossing episode, its most expeditious (at a comparatively lean 144 minutes) and also its darkest—both visually and in terms of the forces that stir in the hearts of men, dwarves and orcs alike." Todd McCarthy of The Hollywood Reporter said "After six films, 13 years and 1031 minutes of accumulated running time, Peter Jackson has concluded his massively remunerative genuflection at the altar of J.R.R. Tolkien with a film that may be the most purely entertaining of any in the collection." Andrew Pulver of The Guardian said "This film is a fitting cap to an extended series that, if nothing else, has transformed Tolkien's place in the wider culture." Chris Tilly from IGN Movies said "There's a little too much padding in the final Hobbit flick, and the best sequence is without doubt the film's first. But the central battle is indeed spectacular, and as 'The Age of Orc' approaches, it rounds out this particular story in stirring and emotional fashion." Russell Baillie of The New Zealand Herald said The Hobbit: The Battle of the Five Armies is "something less than the supposed 'defining chapter' of Jackson's time in Middle-earth as it's been billed. But action-wise, it certainly goes out with a very pleasing bang."

Conversely, Inkoo Kang of TheWrap said "The 144-minute running time showcases Jackson's worst tendencies: eons-long battle scenes, sloppy and abrupt resolutions, portentous romances, off-rhythm comic timing, and, newly in this case, patience-testing fan service." Tim Robey of The Daily Telegraph described the film as "a paragraph on steroids" that was "neither very terrible nor remotely unexpected. It's a series of stomping footnotes in search of a climax." The BBC's Nicholas Barber wrote that with The Hobbit series, Jackson had succeeded in bridging the gap between The Hobbit and The Lord of the Rings and that The Battle of the Five Armies was a "colossal technical achievement", but he also criticised the film for not being compelling because of "its repetitive battle scenes and a lack of plot". Nicolas Rapold of The New York Times said "Bilbo may fully learn a sense of friendship and duty, and have quite a story to tell, but somewhere along the way, Mr. Jackson loses much of the magic."

=== Accolades ===
The film received one Academy Award nomination for Best Sound Editing, as well as praise from critics organisation Broadcast Film Critics Association and from critics groups, such as the Heartland Film Festival, Phoenix Film Critics Society and Hollywood Makeup Artist and Hair Stylist Guild.
