= Valley of the Stereos =

- Directed by: George Port
- Written by: Costa Botes; George Port
- Produced by: Peter Jackson; Jim Booth
- Starring: Danny Mulheron; Murray Keane
- Release date: 1992
- Running time: 15 minutes
- Country: New Zealand
- Language: English

Valley of the Stereos is a 1992 New Zealand short film written by Costa Botes and George Port and produced by Jim Booth and Peter Jackson.

== Plot ==
An escalating battle takes place between River, a hippie and a metalhead who live next door to each other in the countryside. Following the metalhead's late-night music playing, the two battle over who can drive the other away with their incompatible music tastes. Each accumulates a larger and larger pile of stereos, until eventually River converts his house into a multi-stereo mecha and accidentally blasts both homes out of existence.

== Cast ==
- Danny Mulheron as River
- Murray Keane, metalhead

== Reception ==
The film was described as "comic face-off that starts tinny, but gleefully escalates to bass heavy, as a not-so-zen hippy (Danny Mulheron) gets caught up in a vale-blasting battle with the noisy bogan next door (Murray Keane). Made by many key Peter Jackson collaborators, the near-wordless pump up the volume tale was directed by George Port, shortly before he became founding member of Jackson's famed effects-house Weta Digital. Ironically Weta's computer-generated miracles would help render the stop motion imagery seen in the finale largely a thing of the past."

== Accolades ==
The film received various awards.
