= 2010 Qantas Film and Television Awards =

- Awarded for: Excellence in New Zealand film, television and television journalism
- Sponsored by: Qantas
- Date: 18 September 2010; 16 years ago
- Location: Civic Theatre, Auckland
- Country: New Zealand
- Presented by: New Zealand Television Broadcasters Council and the Screen Directors Guild of New Zealand

Television/radio coverage
- Network: TV ONE

The 2010 Qantas Film and Television Awards were held on Saturday 18 September at the Civic Theatre in Auckland, New Zealand. The craft awards were presented in a separate awards lunch at the Auckland Town Hall on Friday 17 September. It was the final of the Qantas Film and Television Awards, before Qantas was lost as the naming-rights sponsor and the awards were renamed the Aotearoa Film and Television Awards.

The awards are best remembered for the expletive-filled acceptance speech given by Breakfast presenter Paul Henry upon winning the People's Choice Award. Highlights from the main awards evening were broadcast on Sunday 19 September on TV ONE.

== Nominees and winners ==
Awards were given in 58 categories, covering news and current affairs, general television, feature film and short film.

=== News and current affairs ===
Qantas Best News

- ONE News (TV One)
  - 3 News (TV3)
  - Tonight (TV One)

Best News or Current Affairs Presenter

- John Campbell, Campbell Live, "Tsunami Aftermath" (TV3)
  - Hilary Barry & Mike McRoberts, 3 News, "Aisling Symes" (TV3)
  - Carly Flynn, Sunrise, "Samoa Tsunami" (TV3)

Best News Reporting

- Paul Hobbs, ONE News, "TSU Funerals" (TV One)
  - Lisa Owen, ONE News, "Baker Hostage" (TV One)
  - Rebecca Wright, 3 News, "Drink Drive Fly" (TV3)

Journalist of the Year

- Paul Hobbs, "TSU Funerals", ONE News (TV One)

Best Current Affairs Reporting for a weekly programme or one off current affairs special

- Janet McIntyre & Joanne Mitchell, Sunday, "Discourse with a Dictator" (TV One)
  - John Hudson & Jane Skinner, Sunday, "Child Brides" (TV One)
  - Karen McCarthy, 60 Minutes, "Homicide" (TV3)

Best Current Affairs Reporting for a daily programme

- Brook Sabin, Campbell Live, "Darryl's Recovery" (TV3)
  - Corinne Ambler, Close Up, "Dwarf" (TV One)
  - Natasha Utting, Campbell Live, "Fraudster" (TV3)

=== News and current affairs (craft) ===
Best Current Affairs Series

- Sunday (TV One)
  - Campbell Live (TV3)
  - Willie Jackson's NewsBites (Maori Television)

Best News Camera

- Steve Lawton, ONE News, "Birds" (TV One)
  - Michael Lacoste, 3 News, "Maubisse, Haiti and Bangkok" (TV3)
  - Daniel O'Sullivan, ONE News, "Ice Energy" (TV One)

Best Current Affairs Camera

- Martin Anderson, 20/20, "Lost and Found" (TV2)
  - Ken Dorman, Sunday, "Brave Choice" (TV One)
  - Belinda Walshe, 60 Minutes, "Braking Point" (TV3)
  - Belinda Walshe, 60 Minutes, "Drug Runner" (TV3)

Best News Editing

- Andrew Gibb, Breakfast, "Spelling Bee" (TV One)
  - Kirsten Bolam, ONE News, "Cavalcade" (TV One)
  - Paul Sparkes, ONE News, "Opshop" (TV One)

Best Current Affairs Editing

- Catherine Hallinan, Campbell Live, "Darryl" (TV3)
  - Andrew Gibb, Close Up, "Apprentice" (TV One)
  - Vicky Harker, Sunday Episode 24, "Born to Dance" (TV One)

=== General television ===
Best Drama Programme

- Outrageous Fortune, South Pacific Pictures (TV3)
  - The Cult, Rachel Gardner, Great Southern Television Ltd (TV 2)
  - Go Girls, South Pacific Pictures (TV3)

Best Comedy Programme

- The Jaquie Brown Diaries, Jaquie Brown, Gerard Johnstone, Young, Gifted & Brown (TV3)
  - 7 Days, Jon Bridges & the downlow concept (TV3)
  - Pulp Sport, Jamie Linehan & Ben Boyce, Shonky Productions (TV3)

Best Maori Language Programme

- E Tu Kahikatea, TeNoni Ltd (Maori Television)
  - AKO, Jeni-Leigh Walker & Pānia Papa (Maori Television)
  - Moteatea, Hinewehi Mohi (Maori Television)

Best Children's/Youth Programme

- Reservoir Hill, KHF Media (TV2)
  - Let's Get Inventin' "Eco Rat Trap", Luke Nola and Friends Ltd (TV2)
  - Kaitangata Twitch, Christopher Hampson Production Shed.TV (Maori Television)

Best Information/Lifestyle Programme

- Radar's Patch, Jane Andrews, JAM TV Ltd (TV One)
  - Fair Go, Graeme Muir, TVNZ (TV One)
  - South, Melanie Rakena and Marcus Lush, JAM TV Ltd (TV One)

Best Entertainment Programme

- The Topp Twins & The APO, Arwen O'Connor, Satellite Media (TV3)
  - Good Morning: Sir Howard Morrison Special, Sally-Anne Kerr, TVNZ (TV One)
  - Homai Te Pakipaki, Homai Te Pakipaki (Maori Television)

Best Sports Broadcast

- TV3 V8 Supercars Hamilton 400, Nigel Carpenter, TV3 (TV3)
  - Heineken Open Tennis Final 2010, Steve Jamieson, TVNZ (TV One)
  - International Netball Series 2009, Barbara Mitchell, TVNZ (TV One)

Best Observational Reality Series

- Intrepid Journeys, Dean Cornish, JAM TV Ltd (TV One)
  - Neighbours at War, Sarah Kinniburgh, Greenstone Pictures (TV2)
  - Piha Rescue, Eric Derks, South Pacific Video Productions (TV One)

Best Constructed Reality Series

- One Land, Julie Christie & Bailey Mackey, Eyeworks New Zealand (TV One)
  - MasterChef New Zealand, Bettina Hollings & Darryl McEwen, Imagination Television (TV One)
  - The Apprentice, Glenn Sims & Philip Smith, Great Southern Television Ltd (TV2)

Best Performance by an Actress – General Television

- Danielle Cormack, The Cult, Great Southern Television Ltd (TV2)
  - Kate Elliott, The Cult, Great Southern Television Ltd (TV2)
  - Siobhan Marshall, Outrageous Fortune, South Pacific Pictures (TV 3)

Best Performance by a Supporting Actress – General Television

- Lisa Chappell, The Cult, Great Southern Television Ltd (TV2)
  - Chelsie Preston Crayford, The Cult, Great Southern Television Ltd (TV2)
  - Miriama Smith, Kaitangata Twitch, Production Shed.TV (Maori Television)

Best Performance by an Actor – General Television

- George Henare, Kaitangata Twitch, Production Shed.TV (Maori Television)
  - Latham Gaines, The Cult, Great Southern Television Ltd (TV2)
  - Kirk Torrance, Outrageous Fortune, South Pacific Pictures (TV3)

Best Performance by a Supporting Actor – General Television

- Matt Whelan, Go Girls, South Pacific Pictures, (TV2)
  - Grant Bowler, Outrageous Fortune, South Pacific Pictures (TV3)
  - Scott Wills, The Cult, Great Southern Television Ltd (TV2)

Best Presenter Entertainment/Factual Programme

- Marcus Lush, South, Jam TV Ltd (TV One)
  - Petra Bagust, What's Really in Our Food?, Top Shelf Productions Limited (TV3)
  - Te Radar, Radar's Patch, JAM TV (TV One)

Best Script – Drama/Comedy Programme

- James Griffin, Outrageous Fortune, South Pacific Pictures (TV3)
  - Michael Bennett, Kaitangata Twitch, Production Shed.TV (Maori Television)
  - Rachel Lang, Go Girls, South Pacific Pictures, (TV2)

Best Director – Drama/Comedy Programme

- Gerard Johnstone, The Jaquie Brown Diaries, Young, Gifted and Brown (TV3)
  - Peter Burger, Go Girls, South Pacific Pictures (TV2)
  - David Stubbs & Thomas Robins, Reservoir Hill, KHF Media Ltd (TV2)

Best Director – Factual/Entertainment Programme

- Melanie Rakena, South, JAM TV Ltd (TV One)
  - Jane Andrews, Radar's Patch, JAM TV (TV One)
  - Belinda Simpson, Intrepid Journeys (TV One)

=== General television (craft) ===
Best Multi Camera Direction in General Television

- Steve Jamieson, Heineken Open Tennis Final 2010, TVNZ (TV One)
  - Steve Jamieson, Takapuna Sprint Triathlon, TVNZ (TV One)
  - Barbara Mitchell, International Netball Series 2009, TVNZ (TV One)

Best Cinematography – Drama/Comedy Programme

- Simon Reira, The Cult, Great Southern Television Ltd (TV2)
  - David Paul, Kaitangata Twitch, Production Shed.TV (Maori Television)
  - Marty Smith, Outrageous Fortune, South Pacific Pictures (TV3)

Images & Sound Best Editing – Drama/Comedy Programme

- Eric de Beus, The Cult, Great Southern Television Ltd (TV2)
  - Bryan Shaw, Outrageous Fortune, South Pacific Pictures (TV3)
  - Mark Taylor, Go Girls, South Pacific Pictures (TV2)

Best Original Music in General Television

- Rhian Sheehan, The Cult, Great Southern Television Ltd (TV2)
  - Gareth Farr, Kaitangata Twitch, Production Shed.TV (Maori Television)
  - Eden Mulholland, World Kitchen, Zoomslide Media Ltd (TV3)

Best Sound Design in General Television

- Tom Miskin, James Hayday & Steve Finnigan, Kaitangata Twitch, Production Shed.TV (Maori Television)
  - Tom Miskin, Steve Finnigan, Go Girls, South Pacific Pictures (TV2)
  - Carl Smith, Outrageous Fortune, South Pacific Pictures (TV3)

Best Production Design in General Television

- Gary Mackay, Kaitangata Twitch, Production Shed (Maori Television)
  - Clayton Ercolano, Outrageous Fortune, South Pacific Pictures (TV3)
  - Gary Mackay, Go Girls, South Pacific Pictures (TV2)

Best Contribution to Design in General Television

- David Cooke, The Cult, Great Southern Television Ltd (TV2)
  - Katrina Hodge, Outrageous Fortune, South Pacific Pictures (TV3)
  - Sarah Voon, Go Girls, South Pacific Pictures (TV2)

=== Documentary ===
Best Popular Documentary

- Lost in Wonderland, Costa Botes, Lone Pine Film
  - Donated to Science, Paul Trotman, PRNfilms (TV3)
  - The Worst Offenders, Virginia Wright, Southern Screen Productions (TV One)

Best Arts/Festival/Feature Documentary * This Way of Life, Cloud South Films

  - There Once was an Island: Te Henua e Nnoho, Lyn Collie and Briar March
  - The Unnatural History of the Kakapo, ELWIN Productions

Best Director – Documentary

- Thomas Burstyn, This Way of Life, Cloud South Films
  - Tearepa Kahi, The Flight of Te Hookioi, Monsoon Pictures International Ltd (Maori Television)
  - Robin Shingleton, Real Crime: The Truth About Us, Project Melting Pot (TV One)

=== Documentary (craft) ===
Best Cinematography – Documentary/Factual Programme

- Marty Williams, Costa Botes & Gareth Moon, Lost in Wonderland, Lone Pine Film
  - Thomas Burstyn, This Way of Life, Cloud South Films
  - Briar March, There Once was an Island: Te Henua e Nnoho

Best Editing – Documentary/Factual Programme

- Prisca Bouchet & Briar March, There Once was an Island: Te Henua e Nnoho
  - Cushla Dillion, This Way of Life, Cloud South Films
  - Ken Sparks, The Worst Offenders, Southern Screen Productions (TV One)

=== Feature film ===
Best Feature Film

- Boy, Ainsley Gardiner, Whenua Films
  - Home by Christmas, Gaylene Preston, Sue Rogers & Nigel Hutchinson, Doublehead Films
  - Under the Mountain, Richard Fletcher, Matthew Grainger & Jonathan King, Redhead Films

Best Director in a Film Feature

- Taika Waititi, Boy, Whenua Films
  - Gaylene Preston, Home by Christmas, Doublehead Films
  - Stephen Sinclair, Russian Snark, Godzone Pictures

Best Lead Actor in a Feature Film

- Tony Barry, Home by Christmas, Doublehead Films
  - Stephen Papps, Russian Snark, Godzone Pictures
  - James Rolleston, Boy, Whenua Films

Best Lead Actress in a Feature Film

- Vera Farmiga, The Vintner's Luck, Ascension Film Ltd
  - Alison Bruce, Life's a Riot, Riot Productions
  - Elena Stejko, Russian Snark, Godzone Pictures

Best Supporting Actor in a Feature Film

- Taika Waititi, Boy, Whenua Films
  - Te Aho Eketone-Whitu, Boy, Whenua Films
  - Sam Neill, Under the Mountain, Redhead Films Limited

Best Supporting Actress in a Feature Film

- Stephanie Tauevihi, Russian Snark, Godzone Pictures
  - Keisha Castle-Hughes, The Vintner's Luck, Ascension Film Ltd
  - Tina Cleary, Home by Christmas, Doublehead Films

Best Screenplay for a Feature Film

- Taika Waititi, Boy, Whenua Films
  - Dean Parker, Life's a Riot, Riot Productions
  - Gaylene Preston, Home by Christmas, Doublehead Films

=== Feature film (craft) ===
Best Cinematography in a Feature Film

- Adam Clark, Boy, Whenua Films
  - Alun Bollinger, Home by Christmas, Doublehead Films
  - Denis Lenoir, The Vintner's Luck, Ascension Film Ltd

Best Editing in a Feature Film

- Chris Plummer, Boy, Whenua Films
  - Ken Sparks, Life's a Riot, Riot Productions
  - Paul Sutorius, Home by Christmas, Doublehead Films

Best Original Music in a Feature Film

- Lukasz Buda, Samuel Scott & Conrad Wedde, Boy, Whenua Films
  - Victoria Kelly, Under the Mountain, Redhead Films Limited
  - David Long & Stephen Gallagher, Russian Snark, Godzone Pictures

Best Sound Design in a Feature Film

- Tim Prebble, Ken Saville, Michael Hedges & Gethin Creagh, Home by Christmas, Doublehead Films
  - Tim Prebble, Gethin Creagh & Gilbert Lake, Under the Mountain, Redhead Films Limited
  - Ken Saville, Tim Prebble, Chris Todd, Michael Hedges & Gilbert Lake, Boy, Whenua Films

Best Production Design in a Feature Film

- Grant Major, The Vintner's Luck, Ascension Film Ltd
  - Ralph Davies, Under the Mountain, Redhead Films Limited
  - Shayne Radford, Boy, Whenua Films

Best Costume Design in a Feature Film

- Beatrix Pasztor, The Vintner's Luck, Ascension Film Ltd
  - Leslie Burkes-Harding, Home by Christmas, Doublehead Films
  - Amanda Neale, Boy, Whenua Films

Best Make-Up Design in a Feature Film

- Steve Boyle & Jane O'Kane, Under the Mountain, Redhead Films Limited
  - Angela Mooar, Home by Christmas, Doublehead Films
  - Dannelle Satherley, Boy, Whenua Films

Best Visual Effects in a Feature Film

- Charlie McClellan, Under the Mountain, Redhead Films Limited
  - Park Road Post, Russian Snark, Godzone Pictures
  - George Ritchie, The Vintner's Luck, Ascension Film Ltd

=== Short films ===
Best Short Film

- thedownlowconcept, Only Son, thedownlowconcept
  - Zoe McIntosh, Day Trip, Lone Pine Film
  - Sam Peacocke, Manurewa, Robber's Dog Films Ltd

Best Performance in a Short Film

- Tuhoe Isaac, Day Trip, Lone Pine Film
  - Aaron McGregor, Choice Night, POP Film
  - Josh Thomson, Only Son, thedownlowconcept

=== Short films (craft) ===
Best Screenplay for a Short Film

- Thedownlowconcept, Ryan Hutchings, Jarrod Holt, Nigel McCulloch, Only Son, thedownlowconcept
  - Sam Peacocke, Manurewa, Robber's Dog Films Ltd
  - Paul Stanley Ward, Choice Night, POP Film

Outstanding Technical Contribution to a Short Film

- Ginny Loane, Redemption, Isola Productions Ltd
  - Robert Key, Roof Rattling, Robin Murphy Productions Limited
  - Gareth Moon, Jodie Stack, Chris Ulutupu & Kate Logan, Day Trip, Lone Pine Film

=== People's choice award ===
- Paul Henry, Breakfast
  - Beth Allen, Shortland Street
  - Jason Gunn, Cheers to 50 Years
  - Kimberley Crossman, Shortland Street
  - Robyn Malcolm, Outrageous Fortune
  - Jaquie Brown, The Jaquie Brown Diaries
  - Mike McRoberts, 3 News
  - Bernadine Oliver-Kerby, ONE News
  - Pippa Wetzell, Breakfast
  - Kevin Milne, Fair Go
