= Gerard Johnstone =

New Zealand filmmaker

- Born: Invercargill, New Zealand
- Occupations: Director; writer
- Years active: 2008–present
- Children: 2

Gerard Johnstone is a New Zealand filmmaker. He is known for the comedy sitcom series The Jaquie Brown Diaries and the horror films Housebound, M3GAN and M3GAN 2.0.

== Early life ==
Johnstone was born in Invercargill, New Zealand, where he attended Verdon College.

== Career ==
In the early 2000s, Johnstone and Jaquie Brown worked together at C4. A few years later, they created a production company, Young, Gifted & Brown, to make the New Zealand sitcom The Jaquie Brown Diaries, based on a satirical fictionalised version of Brown. It began airing in 2008 with Johnstone serving as writer and director.

In March 2014, Johnstone made his directorial debut with Housebound at the South by Southwest festival. The comedy horror film was released on 17 October 2014 in select theatres and VOD. The following year, Johnstone approached New Zealand weightlifter Sonia Manaena, who set the world record in 2013 for deadlifting, about directing a film detailing her life being a competitive weightlifter. Filming was scheduled to begin in 2016, but as of 2023 Johnstone said, "It's been cooking in the background for a long time".

In 2016, he released Terry Teo, a reboot of the 1985 television series, Terry and the Gunrunners. By August 2017, Johnstone was reported to be in the running to direct Warner Bros.' Dark Universe, but instead was hired to polish the script.

Johnstone directed episodes of the first season of The New Legends of Monkey, airing in 2018. That same year, he signed on to direct the comedy horror film, M3GAN. Producer James Wan chose Johnstone for the job after admiring his ability to balance horror and comedy elements in Housebound. M3GAN was released in January 2023 to commercial and critical success. It grossed over $30 million on its opening weekend and garnered positive reviews.

He co-wrote and directed the sequel, M3GAN 2.0, that released in June 2025. The film was less commercially successful than its predecessor, grossing $39 million worldwide, though it later achieved better performance on streaming platforms. That same month Johnstone signed on to direct Universal Pictures' live-action Monster High film.

== Personal life ==
Johnstone is married. He has two sons, born in 2012 and 2014.

== Filmography ==
=== Film ===
Year	Title	Director	Writer	Producer	Notes
2014	Housebound	Yes	Yes	No	Also editor
2022	M3GAN	Yes	No	No	
2025	M3GAN 2.0	Yes	Yes	Executive	
2026	Soulm8te	No	No	Executive	

=== Television ===
Year	Title	Director	Writer	Notes
2008–2009	The Jaquie Brown Diaries	Yes	Yes	Creator, also edited 6 episodes
2016	Terry Teo	Yes	Yes	Directed 6 episodes, wrote 4 episodes
2018	The New Legends of Monkey	Yes	No	6 episodes, also executive producer
