= Lili Sumner =

New Zealand fashion model (born 1994)

Lili Sumner (Lilian Sumner)
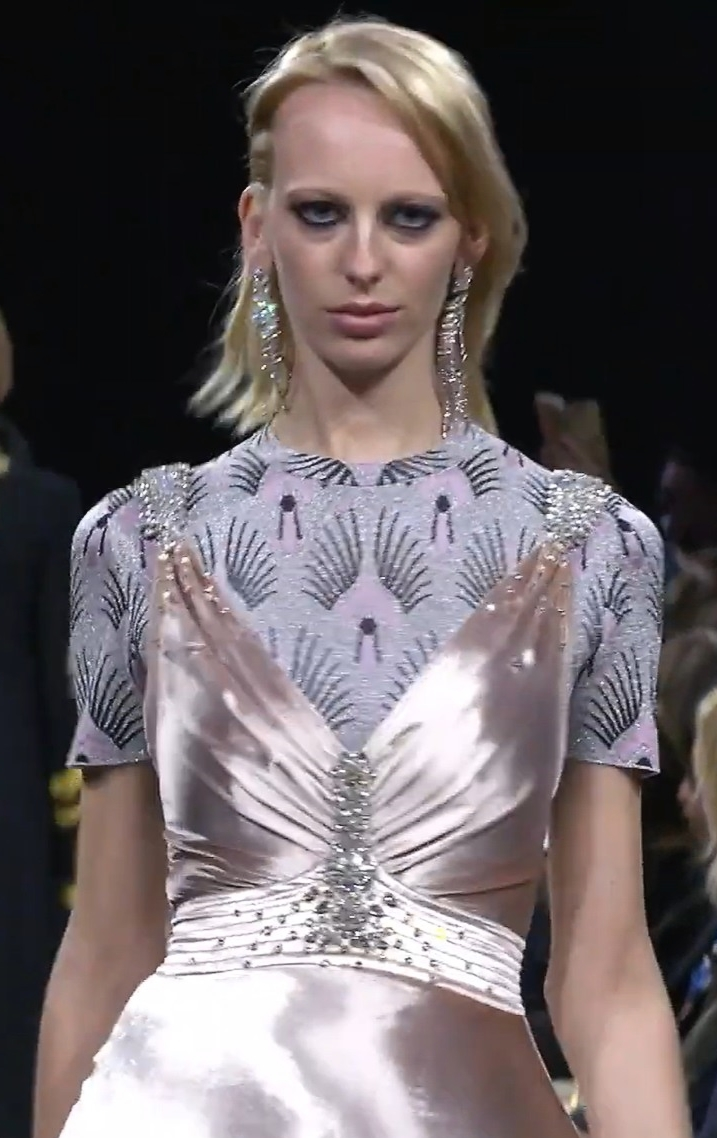
- Sumner walks at the Paco Rabanne Fall Winter 2019-20 show
- Born: Lilian Sumner Gilbert; 24 June 1994 (age 32); Ponsonby, New Zealand
- Occupation: Model
- Parent(s): Barbara Sumner-Burstyn; John Gilbert
- Modeling information
- Height: 5 ft 9 in (1.75 m)
- Hair color: Blonde
- Eye color: Blue
- Agency: MIKAs (Stockholm); Chic Management (Sydney); Bon Image Corp. (Tokyo); Next Models (worldwide)

Lilian Sumner Gilbert (born 24 June 1994) is a New Zealand fashion model based in New York City.

== Early life ==
Sumner grew up between Wellington, Auckland and Napier, New Zealand with six sisters and one brother Her mother is writer Barbara Sumner-Burstyn. Her father is New Zealand film editor and Academy Award winner John Gilbert.

== Career ==
Sumner started her career in London at age 17. She made her official runway debut with Hedi Slimane at Yves Saint Laurent. She has walked the runway for Sonia Rykiel, Miu Miu, Kenzo, Haider Ackermann, Lanvin, Vionnet, Marc Jacobs, Kate Spade, Diane von Fürstenberg, and Céline.

Sumner has been on the cover of Numéro, Vogue Ukraine, Vogue Czechoslovakia, Vogue Italia, Modern Matter, Double, Purple, Zoo, Document, 10 Magazine, Arena Homme + and more. .

Sumner wrote and directed a short film in 2019 titled Lucan Asks Why starring Coco Gordon-Moore and Lilac Cianciolo. The film was part-funded by Gucci and debuted at the Gucci Wooster Store in New York City.
