= John Gilbert (film editor) =

New Zealand film editor

- Occupation: Film editor
- Spouse(s): Barbara Sumner; Karen Tonks; Barbara Webster
- Children: 4 (including Lili Sumner)

John Gilbert is a New Zealand film editor. Gilbert has edited 28 feature films as well as television shows and short films. He won the Academy Award for Best Film Editing and the BAFTA Award for Best Editing, among several honors, for Mel Gibson's war drama Hacksaw Ridge (2016). Gilbert had earlier received various accolades for his work on Peter Jackson's The Lord of the Rings: The Fellowship of the Ring (2001), including the Satellite Award for Best Editing and nominations for an Academy Award, a BAFTA Award and an ACE Eddie Award.

John Gilbert's first position in film was with Government filmmaking body The National Film Unit, in his native New Zealand. Gilbert was taking a break from history and anthropology studies at the time, but never returned to university, moving on to Television New Zealand, where he worked as an assistant editor and editor. Gilbert also spent time freelancing as a sound editor.

Gilbert's first credit as an editor on a full-length feature was for the film Crush (1992), which was invited to the Cannes Film Festival. Gilbert received a "Best Editing" award from the New Zealand Film and Television Awards for comedy drama film Via Satellite (1998). He received a New Zealand Screen Award for editing The World's Fastest Indian (2005) and reunited with Mel Gibson on the historical drama The Professor and the Madman.

Gilbert has been elected to membership in the American Cinema Editors.

== Selected filmography (editor) ==
Short film

Year	Title	Director
1989	The Lounge Bar	Don McGlashan; Harry Sinclair
1996	Siren	Charles Bracewell
2004	Kerosene Creek	Michael Bennett

Feature film

Year	Title	Director
1992	Crush	Alison Maclean
1993	Jack Be Nimble	Garth Maxwell
1994	Loaded	Anna Campion
1996	Chicken	Anna Campion
1997	Aberration	Tim Boxell
1998	Via Satellite	Anthony McCarten
1999	Punitive Damage	Annie Goldson
2001	The Lord of the Rings: The Fellowship of the Ring	Peter Jackson
2003	Perfect Strangers	Gaylene Preston
2005	The World's Fastest Indian	Roger Donaldson
2007	Bridge to Terabithia	Gábor Csupó
2008	Show of Hands	Anthony McCarten
2008	The Bank Job	Roger Donaldson
2009	Bandslam	Todd Graff
2010	Matariki	Michael Bennett
2011	Killer Elite	Gary McKendry
2014	The November Man	Roger Donaldson
2016	Hacksaw Ridge	Mel Gibson
2018	Adrift	Baltasar Kormákur
2022	The 355	Simon Kinberg
2022	The King's Daughter	Sean McNamara
2024	Damsel	Juan Carlos Fresnadillo
2027	The Resurrection of the Christ: Part One	Mel Gibson
2028	The Resurrection of the Christ: Part Two	Mel Gibson

== Awards and nominations ==
Year	Title	Award/Nomination
1998	Via Satellite	Nokia New Zealand Film & TV Award for Best Editing
2001	The Lord of the Rings: The Fellowship of the Ring	Satellite Award for Best Editing; Nominated — Academy Award for Best Film Editing; Nominated — ACE Eddie Award for Best Edited Feature Film – Dramatic; Nominated — BAFTA Award for Best Editing; Nominated — Online Film & Television Association Award for Best Film Editing
2016	Hacksaw Ridge	AACTA Award for Best Editing; Academy Award for Best Film Editing; BAFTA Award for Best Editing; Hollywood Editor Award; Satellite Award for Best Editing; 2nd place — Boston Society of Film Critics Award for Best Editing; 2nd place — SLFCA Award for Best Editing; Nominated — ACE Eddie Award for Best Edited Feature Film – Dramatic; Nominated — Critics' Choice Movie Award for Best Editing; Nominated — Gold Derby Award for Best Film Editing; Nominated — Online Film & Television Association Award for Best Film Editing
