= Intrepid Journeys =

- Genre: Reality show
- Starring: See below
- Country of origin: New Zealand
- No. of episodes: 38

Production
- Production location: See below
- Running time: 60 minutes (Including commercials)

Original release
- Network: TVNZ
- Release: 2003 – present

Intrepid Journeys is a New Zealand television series, which was broadcast on TV ONE in New Zealand and on Vibrant TV Network in the United States. Making its debut in 2003, the show focuses on New Zealand celebrities who travel to exotic countries to see that country's history, culture and people. Created by Melanie Rakena of boutique production company Jam TV.

A multi-award-winning travel series, it is not a “Survivor” style manufactured “challenge” show. It is about meeting real challenges in the real world, travelling to lesser-known places and then getting around the way locals do... by foot, bus and camel.

Across each hour-long episode, Intrepid Journeys follows a celebrity traveller for two weeks in a rough and ready destination. The appeal of the show is two-fold. Aside from seeing a personality rise to a challenge, there is also the chance to gather knowledge and understanding of places, lives, events and happenings foreign to Western culture.

Although they are celebrity travellers, they travel and live as the locals do - ride bumpy local buses with chickens and goats, stay in villages and eat traditional food which stretches the palate.

Destinations include Libya, Borneo, Iran, Uganda, Myanmar, Tibet, Madagascar, Nicaragua, Bolivia, Cuba, Vietnam, Ecuador and Mali.

== Series one (2003) ==
Episode	Celebrity	Destination(s)
1	Peter Elliott	Kenya Actor Peter Elliott has done very little travel anywhere let alone to somewhere like Africa. Dealing with fears about bugs, diseases and big animals was just the start of getting to grips with Kenya for Elliott. He runs the gauntlet in Nairobi, otherwise known as Nairobbery, attempting to beat the statistics and not get mugged. Elliott spends the night with a Maasai tribe and joins them in their traditional jumping ceremony. Elliott sees four of Kenya's game parks packed with elephants, crocodiles, lions, rhinos, hippopotamus, giraffe and zebra
2	Peta Mathias	Bolivia Chef and celebrity foodie, Peta Mathias attempts 12 days in Bolivia. Mathias braves an altitude of 5,000 metres and shivers though -21 degrees. She samples Bolivia's famous white powder, the salt created on the spectacular salt plains.
3	Robyn Malcolm	Vietnam Actor Robyn Malcolm finds trekking in 36 degree heat and 90 percent humidity in the Northern reaches of Vietnam more confronting than she ever anticipated. Malcolm experiences traditional life in the hill tribes. She visits the Vinh Moc tunnels and war sites that claimed millions of lives.
4	Pio Terei	India Comedian Pio Terei makes a good fist of going vegetarian while rowing down the Ganges and exploring the cultural riches of Northern India. His efforts are rewarded with sightings of dolphins and dead bodies. Terei must also brave first hand experience of the way the Maharajahs lived and close encounters with a camel.
5	Michael Laws	Ecuador Former politician Michael Laws finds his silver tongue is tied thanks to the fact everyone speaks Spanish, a language of which he can barely speak a word. He has to survive an excursion into the Amazon, a close shave with jungle hallucinogenic and the spells of a local witch doctor. Laws visits a town officially closed by the local government because of the threat from an erupting volcano.
6	Craig Parker	Nepal Hellambu trek Lord of the Rings actor, Craig Parker treks into the foothills of the Himalayas. Parker travelled through Nepalese villages carrying his worldly possessions on his back. Seven days of trekking took him higher than Mt Cook.
7	Marcus Lush	Egypt Talk-show host Marcus Lush visits the pyramids but from there on it is off the beaten track thanks to a felucca on the Nile and falafels and camels on dry land.

== Series two (2004) ==
Episode	Celebrity	Destination(s)
8	Kerre Woodham	Cambodia Radio talk-show host, Kerre Woodham visits Angkor Wat and surrounding ruins. Woodham sees the remains of the Khmer Rouge torture centre, S21, which was built inside a former school and visits what remains of the Killing Fields, meeting children from a nearby school.
9	Danielle Cormack	Syria, Jordan Actor Danielle Cormack spends a night in the desert of Wadi Rum, where Lawrence of Arabia was filmed. She visits Bedouins living and farming in the desert and stays in a desert tent where her dinner is cooked in an underground oven. Cormack is also invited into the house of a group of Syrian women. Over coffee, there is a chance to learn something of the communal life of five generations of this family. The grandmother wears the traditional hand tattoos while her granddaughter speaks English and wears western style clothing along with her headscarf. Cormack sees the ruins of Petra and then goes to the village the government forced those who used to live in among the ruins to go to. She goes inside the house of the local sheikh, meets his wife, sees her kitchen and is asked to be his 8th wife despite him being in his 80s.
10	Tim Shadbolt	Borneo Rebel Mayor Tim Shadbolt gets to see the work done at an endangered turtle project – seeing a turtle lay her eggs on the beach at night and watching a group of hatchlings set free. Shadbolt also stays in the jungle overnight and helps with an eco-project assisting with jungle re-forestation – necessary due to the decimation of the environment due to Palm Oil plantations.
11	Ewen Gilmour	Peru Due to a lack of land (or an ability to afford it) people have made homes on the reeds that grow in Lake Titicaca, a high altitude lake in Peru. They have become known as Reed People. Comedian Ewen Gilmour helps them move their basic house to allow for more reeds to be laid down. The inhabitants still wear local dress but have access to power through solar panels. Gilmore also visits an Incan cemetery where ancient mummies are on display in open pits and marvels at the ancient stonework of Machu Picchu.
12	Paul Henry	Tibet Newsreader Paul Henry demonstrates how hard it is to climb in thin air accompanied by a traditional Sherpa guide. The guide demonstrates a wonderful singing voice while Paul struggles to catch his breath. Once there, he talks to one of Base Camp's permanent residents about what is happening with tourists coming up the mountain.
13	Karyn Hay	East Timor Writer Karyn Hay finds the former war-torn East Timor is slowly rebuilding. Life is far from ordinary in the villages, highlands and coastal towns with strange forms of illicit gambling, playing Russian Roulette on nearly impassable roads and tracking crocodiles. Hay also finds former generals keen to share their stories of dark times and hopes for a better future.
14	John Gadsby	Myanmar Comedian Jon Gadsby visits Myanmar (formerly Burma). He visits Number two Monk at the Inle Lake, Shue Shue Min, a village girl who helps him in his hour of need, and Joe the fisherman who shows him how to row with your feet and the local fishing method using baskets and spears.
15	Hugh Sundae	Mongolia Reporter Hugh Sundae spends an uncomfortable night on the floor of a ger, a traditional communal wool-lined tent with a local Mongolian family. Despite being -20 degrees at times, the locals live in this nomadic way... though they now have TV thanks to a satellite dish and solar panel. Communication is not possible through language but Hugh makes a connection through farming familiarity - with milking the goat and riding a yak bareback. Sundae also gets to hear Mongolian throat singers.
16	Katie Wolfe	China Actor Katie Wolfe sails on the Yangtze River which is being flooded, as the world's largest dam project nears completion. The process is forcing people out of their homes. She walks amongst a huge city deserted as it has been evacuated and will soon go underwater visiting a place the Chinese consider their spiritual equivalent of Cape Reinga but discovers it is more like a fairground.
17	Donald Sunderland	Mexico The Guatemalans practise pagan worship in many forms. The cleansing interior designer Donald Grant Sunderland participates in a traditional one, conducted in Spanish, which appeals to St Maximon. The ceremony involves offerings to an effigy and a Shamanic recitation followed with the spitting of alcohol as a physical cleansing.

== Series three (2005) ==
Episode	Celebrity	Destination(s)
18	Andrew Fagan	Indonesia Musician Andrew Fagan packs his bags and a few homemade toy boats to share with the locals in this land of many islands. On the road he tries rickshaw driving, attends a ritualistic animal sacrifice and visits a cockfighting meet – the sport was banned but is allowed for spiritual cleansings and other traditional purposes.
19	Dave Dobbyn	Morocco Musician Dave Dobbyn wanders the medina of the ancient city of Fez, a world heritage site where not a great deal has changed for 500 years. Dobbyn spends time in the harsh environment of the desert and learns to ride a camel.
20	Marcus Lush	Trans-Siberia (Russia) Talk show host Marcus Lush rides the Trans-Siberian Railway, one third of the way around the globe, crossing several time zones and discovers that this is the only practical way for Russians to get to Vladivostok as there are no roads.
21	Kim Hill	Cuba Radio talk show host Kim Hill finds she is at home in the country of cigars and old cars, rumba and the revolution. She meets a group of dancers who are worshippers of the Hoodoo religion and is invited to their Sunday worship and a roadtrip to The Bay of Pigs with Lola and her aging wheels.
22	Roger Hall	Uganda Playwright Roger Hall treks into the jungle of Uganda to see the endangered gorillas who live protected in a wild habitat but are still likely to be extinct within ten years. Braving bad roads he rafts the Nile and Grade 5 rapids, and finds elephants in the game parks.
23	Rawiri Paratene	Nicaragua Actor and star of Whale Rider, Rawiri Paratene visits Nicaragua. From the ravages of volcanos and revolution he finds the road to recovery is a long one. On a personal note, Paratene attempts to climb a volcano and doesn't quite make it to the summit.
24	Lisa Chappell	Malaysia McLeod's Daughters actor, Lisa Chappell finds the jungle in Malaysia a snake-filled nightmare. She tries to rise to the challenge of backpacking but finds hard beds, trekking and bugs a bit too much to bear.

== Series four (2006) ==
Episode	Celebrity	Destination(s)
25	Bernadine Oliver-Kerby	Croatia Newscaster Bernadine Oliver-Kerby travels to the former war-torn area her brother served in as a peacekeeper, sees the still all to obvious ravages in the form of minefields and ruined buildings and on the brighter side, joins in a traditional Croatian dance and is then put through a ceremony that happens before locals wed.
26	Trelise Cooper	Turkey Fashion designer Trelise Cooper finds inspiration watching rug weavers restore ancient carpets but finds the wind is taken out of her sails while hot-air ballooning over Cappadoccia and having to scale a mountainside in the dark.
27	Miriama Smith	China Miriama Smith visits a village near the border of Tibet. She joins a family for lunch and tastes the yak butter tea. She treks the epic and inspiring Tiger Leaping Gorge and finds a doctor, the quirky Dr Ho, with an impressive reputation and an array of alternative treatments.
28	John McBeth	Venezuela Sports commentator, John McBeth has a close call with drugs officers at the border but makes in through to see the highest waterfall in the world, the ravages of old-fashioned mining and what appears to be a plethora of contenders for the title of Miss Venezuela.
29	Chris Knox	South India (India) Songwriter Chris Knox explores the Backwaters, Ayervedic healing and village life in Southern India.
30	Jeff Wilson	Romania, Hungary, Bulgaria Former All Black Jeff Wilson gets a lesson in horseback archery from a Hungarian horseman, visits the home of Dracula and an oppressively golden palace and finds an All Black fan on the train who takes him home to meet Mum and Dad.

== Series five (2007) ==
Episode	Celebrity	Destination(s)
31	Jeremy Wells	Libya Actor Jeremy Wells explores Tripoli's medina, dines in Berber settlements, journeys through the Jebel Nafusa highlands, and rides an angry camel. He drives to the desert border of Algeria to show Ahmed Zaoui a glimpse of his homeland, wanders the ruins of Leptis Magna, and views the theatre of Sabratha while embracing the Arab custom of 'hand-holding' between men.
32	John Tamihere	China, Pakistan Rebel politician John Tamihere begins his experience away at the Chinese Kashgar's Sunday market. He then travels across the Khunjareb Pass admiring the mountains from Karimabad. He is blown away as he drives the Karakoram Highway, and peeks into Afghanistan at the Khyber Pass whilst holding an AK-47 and shooting some rounds. He visits the giant mosques of Islamabad and the palace city of Lahore.
33	Suzanne Paul	China, Vietnam Entrepreneur Suzanne Paul takes on the wilds of rural Asia. She tackles noisy Hanoi, catches some downtime in sleepy Halong Bay and shops up a storm in some local villages.
34	Mary Lambie	Iran Broadcaster Mary Lambie haggles over a Persian rug, ponders life in Persepolis, drops into an Iranian wedding, and gets dirty with Nomads on her travels in Iran.
35	John Banks	Madagascar Radio presenter and former politician John Banks heads to the stunning mountains, beautiful rainforest, idyllic beaches and endangered lemurs of Madagascar.
36	Anton Oliver	Nepal Fresh off the back of an All Black tour, Anton Oliver jets his way from the UK to trek through Nepal. He discovers not all men are created equal when meeting the men of the hills who seem confounded by his size, yet their strength leaves Oliver speechless.
37	Te Radar	Mali Comedian and self-confessed shambolic traveller, Te Radar, travels to Mali and the legendary Timbuktu, celebrating life and music at the 'Festival au Desert'. Along the way he does battle with a scorpion, a scarf that bleeds purple dye all over him, and sand. The chance to get his future read by a local wiseman doesn't go entirely to plan.

== Series six (2008) ==
Episode	Celebrity	Destination(s)
38	Pam Corkery	Colombia
39	Shane Cortese	Sri Lanka
40	Stephanie Tauevihi	Ladakh
41	Paul Holmes	Yemen
42	Norm Hewitt	Borneo
43	Jenny Shipley	Namibia
44	Glen Osborne	Uzbekistan, Kyrgyzstan

== Series seven (2009) ==
Episode	Celebrity	Destination(s)
45	Kevin Milne	Ukraine
46	Temepara George	India
47	Rhys Darby	Rwanda
48	Ruben Wiki	Laos
49	Judy Bailey	Brazil, Argentina and Uruguay
50	Anika Moa	Mexico, Guatemala and Honduras
51	Brendan Cole	Vanuatu
52	Stephanie Tauevihi	Himalayas

== Series eight (2011) ==
Episode	Celebrity	Destination(s)
53	Tāmati Coffey	Arabian Peninsula
54	Renato Bartolomei	Mongolia
55	Lynda Topp	Tajikistan
56	Simon Gault	Turkey, Iran
57	Keisha Castle-Hughes	Tanzania, Kenya and Zanzibar
58	Frank Bunce	Egypt

== Series nine (2012) ==
Episode	Celebrity	Destination(s)
59	Rachel Hunter	Indonesia
60	Steve Price	Nepal
61	Annie Crummer	Peru and Bolivia
62	Oscar Kightley	Myanmar
63	Pamela Stephenson-Connolly	Papua New Guinea
64	Buck Shelford	Cuba
65	TBA	
