= Stephen Papps =

New Zealand actor

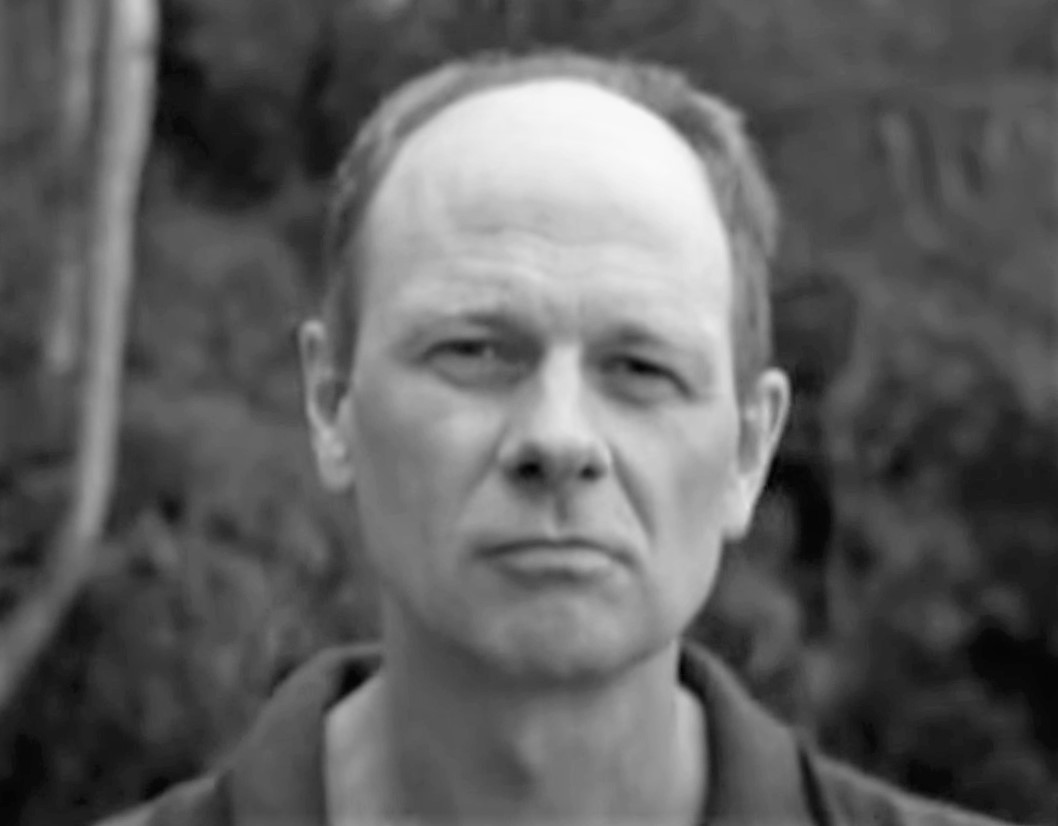
Papps in Russian Snark, 2010

Stephen Papps is an actor from New Zealand. He trained at the Academy Corporate Theatre Actors Workshop and the Wellington Performing Arts Centre, New Zealand.

== Career ==
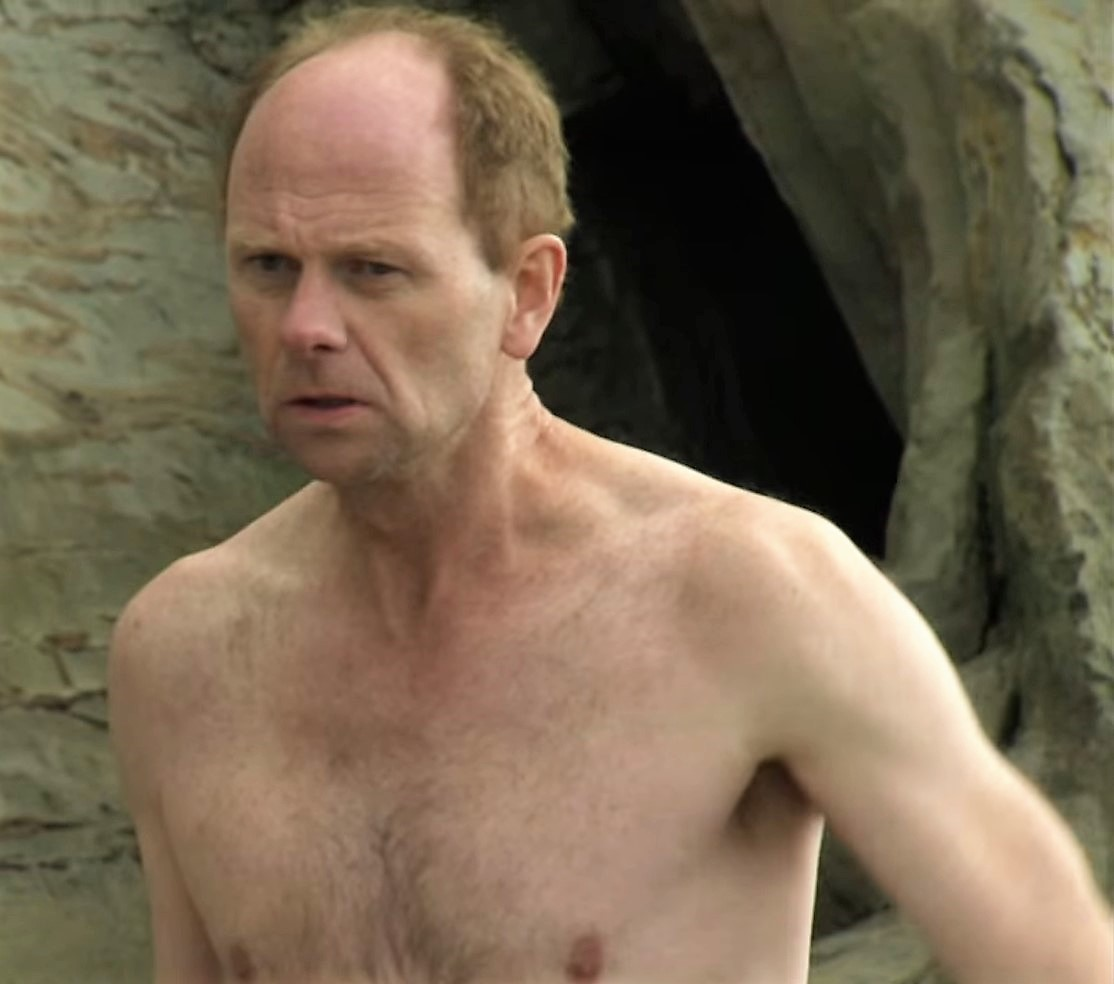
Papps in Russian Snark, 2010

Stephen Papps has appeared in projects that range from the critically acclaimed stage productions The 39 Steps and Mark Twain & Me In Maoriland to the feature films The Piano and Braindead. His television appearances include such series as perennial favourite Shortland Street and Disney's Legend of the Seeker. Stephen also wrote and performed the highly regarded BLOWING IT, which he performed world-wide and for which he was nominated for a Chapman Tripp theatre award.

He began his career in 1991 with the award-winning feature The End of the Golden Weather, for which he won best actor. In Russian Snark, Papps played the lead role of Misha, a Latvian-born Russian filmmaker whose career has seen better days. He was nominated for best actor at the Maverick Film awards 2011 and the New Zealand Film Awards 2010.

== Filmography ==
Year	Film	Role	Notes
2010	Russian Snark	Misha	
2009	Power Rangers R.P.M	Mr Landsdown	"Ranger Yellow: Part 2"
2009	Power Rangers R.P.M	Mr Landsdown	"Ranger Yellow"
2007	We're Here to Help	Doug Johnson	
2002	Murder in Greenwich	The Maryland Man	
1998	Hercules: The Legendary Journeys	The Darkness	"Somewhere over the Rainbow Bridge"
1998	Hercules: The Legendary Journeys	The Darkness	"Norse by Norsevest"
1996	Hercules: The Legendary Journeys	Tritos	"Protean Challenge"
1996	Xena: Warrior Princess	See'er	"Orphan of War"
1993	The Piano	Bluebeard	
1992	Braindead	Zombie McGruder	
1991	The End of the Golden Weather	Firpo	

=== Theatre ===
Year	Title	Role	Notes
2010	Mark Twain and Me in Maoriland	Mark Twain	
2009	The 39 Steps	Various	
2007	Thom Pain	Lead	
2006	Ying Tong	Spike Milligan	
2003	Amadeus	Salieri	
2001	Rosencrantz & Guildenstern are Dead	Tragedian	
