= Terry and the Gunrunners =

Terry and the Gunrunners is a book by New Zealand authors Bob Kerr and Stephen Ballantyne.

The authors created the comic book Terry and the Gunrunners in 1982 as part of a series that also included Terry and the Yodelling Bull (1986) and Terry and the Last Moa (1991).

The comic was a considerable local success, selling over 20,000 copies and eventually the character achieved a cult status as a retro-icon with imagery being used by graphic T-shirt companies. The book was reissued in 2015 to tie in with the new version of the TV series.

== Plot ==
The story is about Terry Teo the skateboarding schoolboy who is the hero of the story. Along with his martial arts expert sister Polly, he takes on the notorious gunrunner Ray Vegas and his henchmen, Bluey and Curly. The bright colours and crazy sets help to recreate the story's comic book origins.

== Adaptations ==
In 1985 it was made into a popular children's television series starring Adrian Bell as Terry Teo and including many stars such as; Michael Bentine (from the Goons), ex-NZ Prime Minister Rob Muldoon, and comedian Billy T. James amongst others. The theme song was composed by Don McGlashan.

On 11 October 2013 it was announced that NZ On Air had funded a new series to be made by Semi-Professional Pictures for TV2.

In 2016, Gerard Johnstone released Terry Teo, a reboot of Terry and the Gunrunners.
