= Diana Peñalver =

Spanish actress

- Born: 1965 (age 60–61); Spain
- Occupation: Actress
- Years active: 1983–present

Diana Peñalver (born 1965) is a Spanish actress known for starring in Braindead (1992), Year of Enlightment (1986) and El Lute: Run for Your Life (1987). She also starred in the Spanish television series Las chicas de hoy en día.
