= Elena Stejko =

Ukraine-born New Zealand actress and theatre director

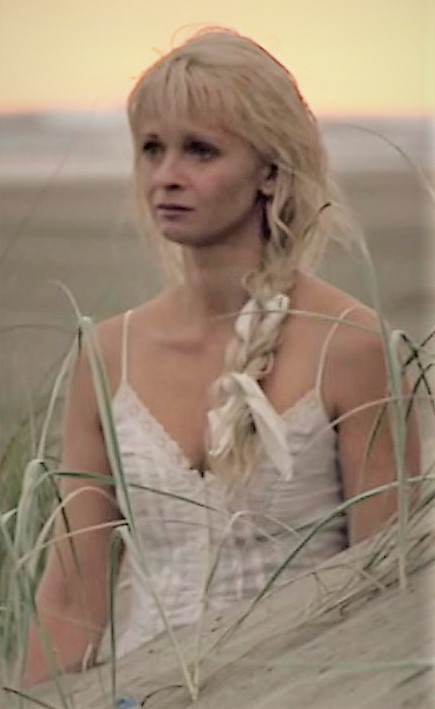
Stejko in Russian Snark, 2010

Elena Stejko is a Ukrainian-born New Zealand actress and theatre director.

== Biography ==
Stejko was born and raised in Kyiv when Ukraine was part of the Soviet Union. In the 1990s she moved to Brazil, where she spent four years, then migrated again to New Zealand, settling in Auckland.

Stejko worked to establish herself as an actor, beginning with small roles, such as television advertisements and in the television drama Mercy Peak. In 2010 she starred in Russian Snark, a film written and directed by Stephen Sinclair. For this role, she was nominated for a Qantas Film and Television Award for best actress. In 2014 she appeared in Taika Waititi's film What We Do in the Shadows.

Stejko has also acted in and directed stage productions in Auckland and established an acting school, Actors Studio.
