= Bruce Mason =

New Zealand playwright

Bruce Mason CBE
- Born: 28 September 1921; Wellington, New Zealand
- Died: 31 December 1982 (aged 61); Wellington, New Zealand
- Occupations: Playwright, actor, critic, fiction writer
- Spouse: Diana Manby Shaw (m. 1945)

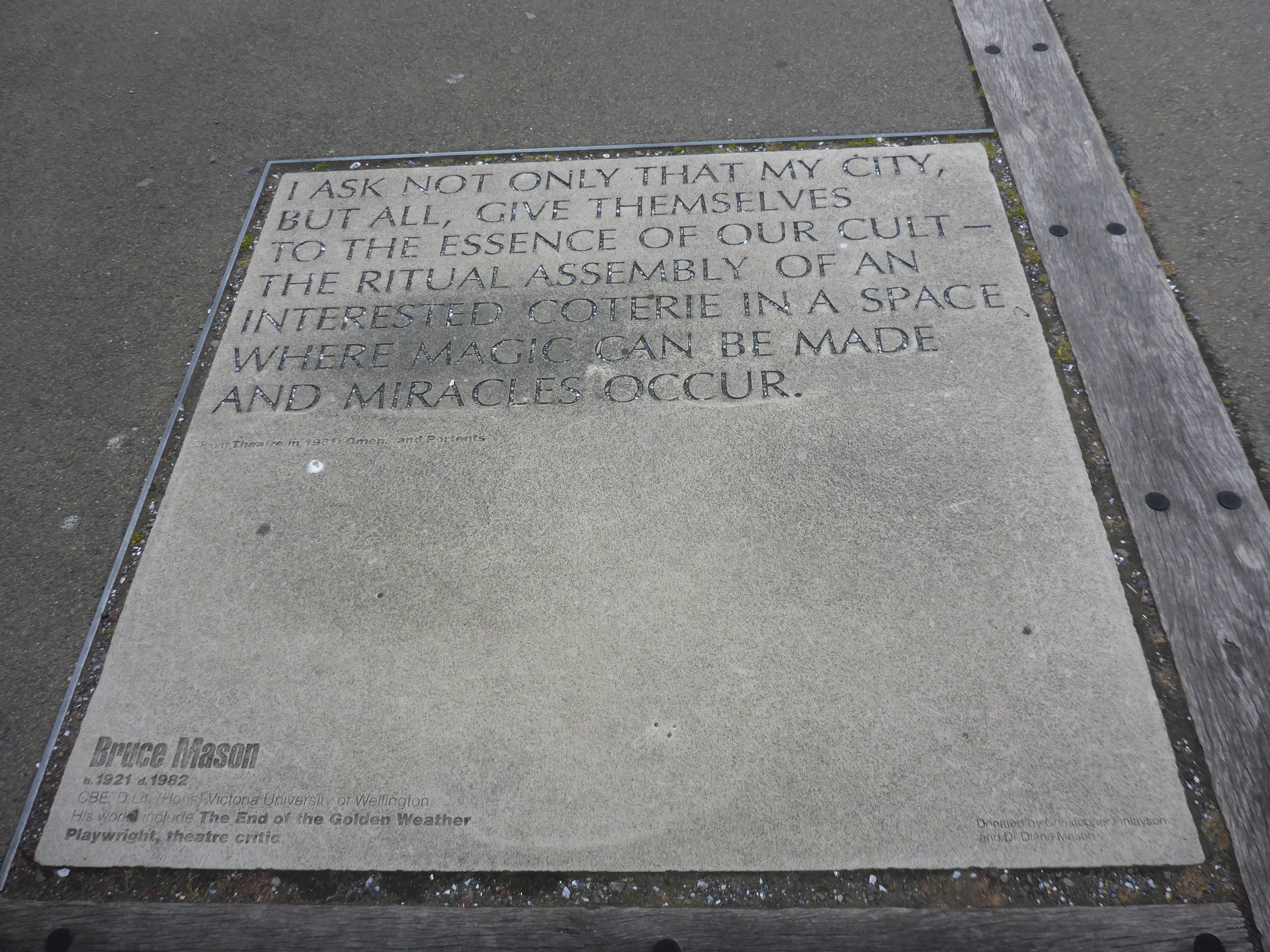
Public art featuring Bruce Mason's words. Wellington Writers Walk

Bruce Edward George Mason CBE (28 September 1921 – 31 December 1982) was a significant playwright in New Zealand who wrote 34 plays and influenced the cultural landscape of the country through his contribution to theatre. In 1980, he was appointed a Commander of the Order of the British Empire. The Bruce Mason Playwriting Award, one of the most important playwrighting accolades in New Zealand, is named in his honour. Mason was also an actor, critic, and fiction writer.

Mason's most well known play is The End of the Golden Weather, a classic work in New Zealand theatre, which he performed solo more than 500 times in many New Zealand towns. It was made into a feature film directed by Ian Mune in 1991. Another significant play is The Pohutukawa Tree written during the 1950s and 1960s. The Pohutukawa Tree was Mason's first major success and explored Māori and Pākehā themes, a common thread in most of his works. Theatre was an avenue for Mason to highlight social and political issues in New Zealand society. He translated Chekhov's The Cherry Orchard for radio in 1960. His works of solo theatre was collected under the title Bruce Mason Solo (1981) and included The End of the Golden Weather. Published in 1987 was The Healing Arch, a cycle of five plays, including The Pohutukawa Tree and Hongi, which focus on Māori culture post European contact.

== Background ==
Mason was born in Wellington moving to Takapuna when he was five. He attended Victoria University College where he took part in drama. In 1945, he graduated with a B.A. He served in the New Zealand Army (1941–1943) and the Naval Volunteer Reserve (1943–1945). He later worked for the New Zealand Forest Service (1951–1957). He edited the Māori news magazine Te Ao Hou (1960–1961). He was a co-founder of Downstage Theatre, New Zealand's first professional theatre in 1964 and wrote a weekly column Music on the Air for the New Zealand Listener from 1964 to 1969. He was also a theatre critic for the capital's newspapers from the 1950s to the 1980s.

== Honours and awards ==
In 1977, Mason was awarded an honorary Doctor of Literature degree by Victoria University of Wellington. In the 1980 New Year Honours, he was appointed a Commander of the Order of the British Empire, for services to literature and the arts.

== Personal life ==
Mason met his wife Diana while studying at Victoria University College and they married in 1945 after the war. A noted obstetrician specialising in women's health, she shared his interest in the arts. They had three children. Their eldest daughter Belinda published Unforgetting: a memoir which records growing up in the Mason family, and that Bruce "was gay, and that he had had more than a dozen love affairs before and during his marriage...."

== Death ==
Bruce Mason died in 1982 from cancer. His wife Diana died in June 2007, nearly 25 years after her husband's death.

== Legacy ==
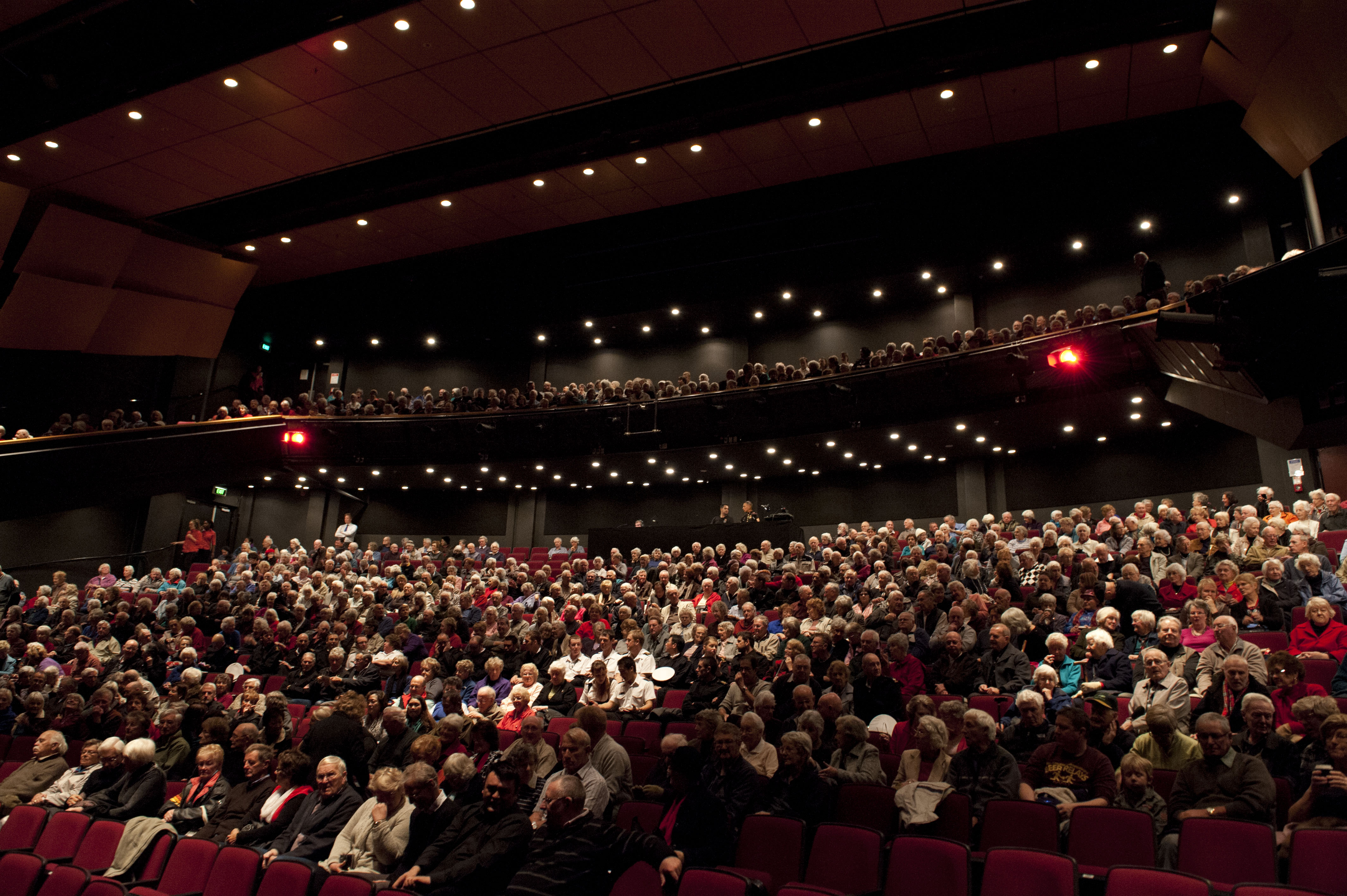
Auditorium of the Bruce Mason Centre

Mason's plays are studied at schools and universities. The Bruce Mason Centre, a major arts and theatre venue in Takapuna, Auckland, 250 metres from the beach where The End of the Golden Weather is set, is also named after him. The centre was opened in 1996 and contains a 1164-seat auditorium. The Promenade Cafe displays Bruce Mason memorabilia, including his original desk and typewriter.

In 2009, The Pohutukawa Tree was staged by Auckland Theatre Company, directed by Colin McColl and starring Rena Owen and Stuart Devenie.

The Bruce Mason Playwriting Award has been running since 1983 currently managed by Playmarket, the FAME Trust (Fund for Acting and Musical Endeavours) and Downstage Theatre Society to award an annual $10,000 to an outstanding emerging New Zealand playwright. Previous winners include several celebrated writers from New Zealand including Hone Kouka, Briar Grace-Smith, Jo Randerson, Victor Rodger, Arthur Meek, Sam Brooks and Mīria George.

== Plays ==
- The Evening Paper 1953
- The Bonds of Love 1953
- The Licensed Victualler 1954
- The Verdict 1955
- A Case in Point 1957
- Birds in the Wilderness 1958
- The End of the Golden Weather (first performed in 1959)
- The Pohutukawa Tree 1960, revised 1963 (first performed at a theatre workshop in 1957)
- The Light Enlarging 1963
- We Don't Want Your Sort Here 1963
- To Russia with Love 1965
- The Waters of Silence 1965
- The Hand on the Rail 1967
- Swan Song 1967
- Hongi 1968, published 1974
- Awatea 1969
- Zero Inn 1970
- Not Christmas, but Guy Fawkes 1976
- Courting Blackbird 1976
- Blood of the Lamb 1981
- Daphne and Chloe 1982 (televised 1983)
- Do Not Go Gentle 1982 (televised 1983)
- The Garlick Thrust 1982 (televised 1983)
- Rise and Shine 1982
