= Diana Mason (doctor) =

New Zealand doctor

Diana Manby Mason OBE (née Shaw; 29 July 1922 – 5 June 2007) was a prominent New Zealand medical doctor and obstetrician also active in the anti-abortion movement during the 1970s.

== Early life ==
Mason was born in 1922 the daughter of Frieda Charlotte Manby Shaw and Charles Bertram Shaw. She grew up in Karori, Wellington where she attended Karori School and Samuel Marsden College. She had always wanted to be a doctor and attended Victoria University of Wellington followed by medical school at the University of Otago from where she graduated in 1945.

== Career ==
Mason's internship at Wellington Hospital during her final year at medical school sparked her interest in obstetrics. She returned to Wellington Hospital as a house surgeon after graduation but in 1947 joined a general practice in Newtown, Wellington. In 1949 she went to England with her husband Bruce Mason and baby daughter to do post–graduate training at the Great Ormond Street Hospital. They returned to New Zealand after three years to live in Tauranga for a year before moving to Wellington where Mason returned to work in the general practice where she had worked earlier.

She became Superintendent of the Alexandra Maternity Hospital and Home for Unmarried Mothers, a home for single mothers whose babies would be adopted out. She held this position from 1958 to 1978.

Mason was opposed to abortion and was politically active in the anti-abortion movement, in particular in the Society for the Protection of the Unborn Child (SPUC); she was SPUC's national president from 1974 to 1976. She was one of several prominent New Zealanders, including Sir William Liley and Ruth Kirk, who headed an anti-abortion rally in Wellington in 1974.

In the late 1980s she became the second woman to hold the office of president of the Wellington division of the New Zealand Medical Association.

She retired at the age of 78.

== Recognition ==
In the 1977 Queen's Silver Jubilee and Birthday Honours, Mason was appointed an Officer of the Order of the British Empire, for services to the community.

== Personal life ==
Mason met her husband, the playwright Bruce Mason, at Victoria University in 1940. They married in 1945 after Bruce returned to New Zealand from war service overseas and she had finished her medical degree. They had three children. Their eldest daughter's memoir Unforgetting: a memoir records growing up in the Mason family, and that Diana knew that Bruce was "fundamentally gay" but both kept it well hidden from their children. Diana and Bruce were well known in the arts and culture world in Wellington.

She died in Wellington on 5 June 2007.
