= The End of the Golden Weather (film) =

- Directed by: Ian Mune
- Written by: Ian Mune; Bruce Mason
- Produced by: Christina Milligan; Ian Mune
- Starring: Stephen Fulford; Stephen Papps
- Cinematography: Alun Bollinger
- Edited by: Michael Horton
- Music by: Stephen McCurdy
- Release date: September 1991
- Running time: 100 min
- Country: New Zealand
- Language: English

The End of the Golden Weather is a 1991 New Zealand film. It was co-written and directed by Ian Hume based on Bruce Mason's play of the same name. It debuted at the Toronto International Film Festival in September 1991 before a New Zealand theatre release in 1992 with a premiere in Wellington on the 25th of February.

Script development began after Mune approached Mason in 1976 but was unable to get financing. After Mason died in 1982 the script was shelved. It was bought back around 1990, obtained funding and filming was commenced in February 1991.

== Cast ==
- Stephen Fulford as Geoff Crome
- Stephen Papps as Firpo
- Paul Gittins as Dad
- Gabrielle Hammond as Mum
- David Taylor as Ted
- Alexandra Marshall as Molly
- Ray Henwood as Reverend Thirle
- Steve McDowell as Jesse Cabot

== Reception ==
Helen Martin in New Zealand film, 1912-1996 says "The narrative is shaped as the reminiscences of a man looking back on his boyhood which is seen not in naturalistic terms, but as a palette of dramatically heightened sensual experiences. But because the narrative is presented as a real-time story and the man is never present, some critics described the film on its release as overwrought and inflated." The Press reviewer Hans Petrovic called it "the best international-standard film this country has produced in several years." He wrote "The actual miracle is in the form of this delightful film, which Mune has managed to people with fantastic characters and set in a timeless world that must come to an end."

Katherine Monk in the Vancouver Sun gave it 2 1/2 stars and said "More pleasant as a film experience, but a lame interpretation of a powerful story." The Ottawa Citizen's Steven Mazey gave it 3 stars and said "In trying to show us the intimidating adults as they're seen through Geoff's eyes, for example, Mune has encouraged many of the adult actors to give grossly exaggerated, performances, and everyone seems to be trying too hard." Rick Groen of the Globe and Mail also gave it 3 stars. He notes "Some of that theatrical excess has been grafted onto the script, scenes included for inclusion's sake and robbing the film of fluidity. So you may find yourself wandering off now and again, but never too far - the boy and his sensibilities keep pulling you back in. The result is an occasionally cluttered picture with a consistently delicate tone — imperfectly finished, but you sense the love in the labour." In the Toronto Star Craig MacInnis begins "The trouble with The End Of The Golden Weather is that someone forgot to tell the film-makers that a parable, no matter how profound, still needs strong story elements to hold an audience's interest."

== Awards ==
New Zealand Film Awards 1992

- Best Film - The End of the Golden Weather (Don Reynolds, Christine Milligan, Ian Mune) - won
- Best Director - Ian Mune - won
- Best Performance, male - Stephen Papps - won
- Best Cinematography - Alun Bollinger - won
- Best Editing - Michael Horton - won
- Best Contribution to design (costume) - Barbara Darragh - won
- Best Production Design - Ron Highfield - won
- Best Film Score - Stephen McCurdy - won
