= Barbara Sumner =

New Zealand film producer and writer

- Born: Barbara Sumner; 1960 (age 65–66); New Zealand
- Occupations: Writer, filmmaker
- Spouse(s): John Gilbert; Thomas Burstyn
- Children: 5, including Lili Sumner

Barbara Sumner (born 1960) is a New Zealand writer and film producer. Tree of Strangers, her memoir of adoption, loss and discovery, was published by Massey University Press in September 2020.

She co-founded the film production company Cloud South Films with her husband Thomas Burstyn, and has served as a writer for The New Zealand Herald.

== Bibliography ==
- This Way of Life (2013)
- Tree of Strangers (2020)

== Filmography ==
- One Man, One Cow, One Planet (2007, as producer and writer)
- This Way of Life (2009, as producer and writer)
- Red White Black & Blue (2012, as producer)
- This Way of Life (2013)
- Some Kind of Love (2015, as producer and writer)

== Awards ==
This Way of Life (2011):

- Shortlist 2011 Academy Awards
- Berlin International Film Festival, Jury Prize.
- Big Sky Documentary Film Festival, Best Feature Film,
- Victoria Independent FF, Texas, Best Documentary
- Bend International FF, Oregon, Best Documentary 2012
- Bend International FF, Oregon, Best Feature Film, 2012
- Iowa Indie Film Festival 2011, People's Choice -
- Iowa Indie Film Festival 2011, Best Documentary
- Docville Official Selection 2011 Belgium
- DocEdge Festival Outstanding Contribution to New Zealand Documentary 2011 Qantas Film Awards 2010, Best Documentary
- FIFO 2011 Special Jury Award
- Anuuruaboro Youth Jury Prize
- Wairoa Maori Film Festival 2010, Audience Award
- Plus Cameraimage nominated Best Cinematography, Poland 2010
- Sold to 22 countries

One Man, One Cow, One Planet:

- Best Environmental Conservation Film: CMS Vatravan, India
- Katherine Knight Award: EarthVision International Film Festival
- Best Non-Broadcast Film: Jackson Hole Wildlife Film Festival
- Award of Excellence: The Accolade
- Sold to 16 countries
