= Braindead (film) =

1992 film by Peter Jackson

- Theatrical release poster
- Directed by: Peter Jackson
- Screenplay by: Stephen Sinclair; Fran Walsh; Peter Jackson
- Story by: Stephen Sinclair
- Produced by: Jim Booth
- Starring: Timothy Balme; Diana Peñalver; Elizabeth Moody; Ian Watkin
- Cinematography: Murray Milne
- Edited by: Jamie Selkirk
- Music by: Peter Dasent
- Production companies: WingNut Films; Avalon Studios Limited; The New Zealand Film Commission
- Distributed by: John Maynard Productions
- Release date: 13 August 1992
- Running time: 104 minutes
- Country: New Zealand
- Language: English
- Budget: $3 million
- Box office: $242,623 (United States)

Braindead, released in the United States as Dead Alive, is a 1992 New Zealand zombie comedy splatter film directed by Peter Jackson, produced by Jim Booth, and written by Stephen Sinclair, Fran Walsh, and Jackson based on an original story idea by Sinclair. It stars Timothy Balme, Diana Peñalver, Elizabeth Moody, and Ian Watkin. The plot follows Lionel, a young man living in South Wellington with his strict mother Vera. After Lionel becomes romantically entangled with a girl named Paquita, Vera is bitten by a hybrid rat-monkey creature and begins to transform into a zombie, while also infecting dozens of Wellingtonians.

Made on a budget of $3 million, Braindead was Jackson's most expensive film up to that point. Although it received positive reviews from critics, it was a box office bomb. It has since received a cult following, and is now widely regarded as one of the goriest films of all time.

== Plot ==
In 1957, on Skull Island, zoo official Stewart McAlden and his team attempts to smuggle out a Sumatran rat-monkey, a hybrid creature that resulted from the rape of tree monkeys by plague-carrying rats. While fleeing from the island's warrior natives, who demand the creature's return, Stewart is bitten by the rat-monkey. The crew, fearing the effects of the bite, dismembers and kills him. The captured rat-monkey is then shipped to Wellington Zoo in Newtown.

In Hataitai, the meek Lionel Cosgrove lives with his domineering mother Vera in a Victorian mansion. To Vera's dismay, Lionel falls in love with Paquita María Sánchez, a Spanish Romani shopkeeper's daughter. When the two go on a date at Wellington Zoo, Vera stalks them and is bitten by the rat-monkey, which she promptly impales the head of with her heel.

Over the following days, Vera grows more decrepit and dies before reanimating as a ravenous zombie. Vera devours Paquita's dog and kills the attending nurse, Mrs. McTavish, who also returns as a zombie. Although unable to comprehend what's going on, Lionel keeps them sedated with animal tranquilizers and locked in the basement. He frantically covers the mess as Paquita's grandmother comes over to visit and gives him a pendant for luck. Vera breaks out of the basement and is run over by a tram.

Lionel arranges Vera's funeral and burial, keeping her tranquilized to protect the mourners. Later, he returns to the graveyard to administer more tranquilizer, but is beaten by a group of hoodlums who mistake him for a necrophiliac. Vera bursts from her grave and attacks the hoodlums. In the ensuing commotion, the gang leader, "Void," as well as the local priest, Father McGruder, are bitten and become zombies, prompting Lionel to lock them up in the basement as well. After discovering that the nurse and priest have copulated and produced a zombie baby, Lionel breaks up with Paquita to keep her safe.

Lionel's uncle, Les, arrives to confront Lionel over Vera's estate. In the basement, Les sees the tranquilized zombies and mistakenly believes them to be dead bodies. He blackmails his nephew into relinquishing the house and his inheritance. Despite Lionel's objections, he invites his friends over for a housewarming party.

During the party, Paquita arrives to make amends with Lionel. After she discovers the zombies in the basement, Lionel explains the situation to her. She convinces him to use poison to kill the zombies. However, Lionel mistakenly injects them with an animal stimulant instead. The pair narrowly escapes as the invigorated zombies rush upstairs and infect the party guests. Lionel uses a lawn mower to mow through the zombies, while Paquita disposes of the still-hostile zombie body parts with a blender. Les enters the basement, where he is beheaded by Vera, who has now grown to monstrous proportions. Vera erupts from the basement and pursues Lionel and Paquita to the rooftop as the house catches fire from a burst gas pipe.

Lionel confronts Vera and reveals that he witnessed her drowning his father and his mistress as a child, which caused his trauma. After he proclaims that he is no longer afraid of her, an enraged Vera stuffs Lionel into her stomach and prepares to kill Paquita. Lionel cuts his way out of his mother's body with the good luck pendant, causing Vera to fall into the burning house.

Lionel and Paquita escape the burning rooftop with the help of the arriving fire brigade, and, after sharing a kiss, walk away in victory.

== Cast ==
- Timothy Balme as Lionel Cosgrove
- Diana Peñalver as Paquita María Sánchez
- Elizabeth Moody as Vera Cosgrove
  - Elizabeth Brimilcombe as Zombie Vera
- Ian Watkin as Uncle Les
- Brenda Kendall as Nurse McTavish
- Stuart Devenie as Father McGruder
  - Stephen Papps as Zombie McGruder
- Jed Brophy as Void
- Murray Keane as Scroat
- Glenis Levestam as Nora Matheson
- Lewis Rowe as Albert Matheson
- Tina Regtien as Mandy
- Elizabeth Mullane as Rita
- Harry Sinclair as Roger
- Davina Whitehouse as Paquita's Grandmother
- Silvio Famularo as Paquita's father
- Daniel Sabic as Baby Selwyn (body)
  - Vicki Walker as Baby Selwyn (voice)
- Bill Ralston as Stewart McAlden
- Brian Sergent as Vet
- Forrest J Ackerman as Forry (Tourist at Zoo with Monsters of Filmland magazine)
- Peter Vere-Jones as the Undertaker
- Tich Rowney as Barry
- Tony Hiles as the Zookeeper
- Peter Jackson (cameo) as the Undertaker's assistant

== Production ==
The film had its origins while Jackson was filming his feature film debut, Bad Taste (1987). He met with writers Fran Walsh and Stephen Sinclair, who were also interested in creating a zombie film, and the three spent the next several years conceiving the project. Principal photography took place over eleven weeks on location in and around Wellington on a reported budget of around $3 million. The film was shot on Super 16mm, as opposed to 35mm, so that more of the budget could be spent on effects. The film's special effects were crafted by Bob McCarron and Richard Taylor, with some miniature models being created by Jackson himself. For the film's climactic scene, wherein Lionel massacres a horde of zombies with a lawn mower, a reputed 300 litres (79.2 gallons) of fake blood was used.

The film's music was composed by Peter Dasent.

The film was subject to a lawsuit after release. In Bradley v WingNut Films Ltd [1993] 1 NZLR 415, it was alleged that Braindead had infringed the privacy of the plaintiffs by containing pictures of the plaintiff's family tombstone. After reviewing the New Zealand judicial authorities on privacy, Gallen J stated: "the present situation in New Zealand ... is that there are three strong statements in the High Court in favour of the existence of such a tort in this country and an acceptance by the Court of Appeal that the concept is at least arguable." This case became one of a series of cases which contributed to the introduction of tort invasions of privacy in New Zealand.

== Filming locations ==
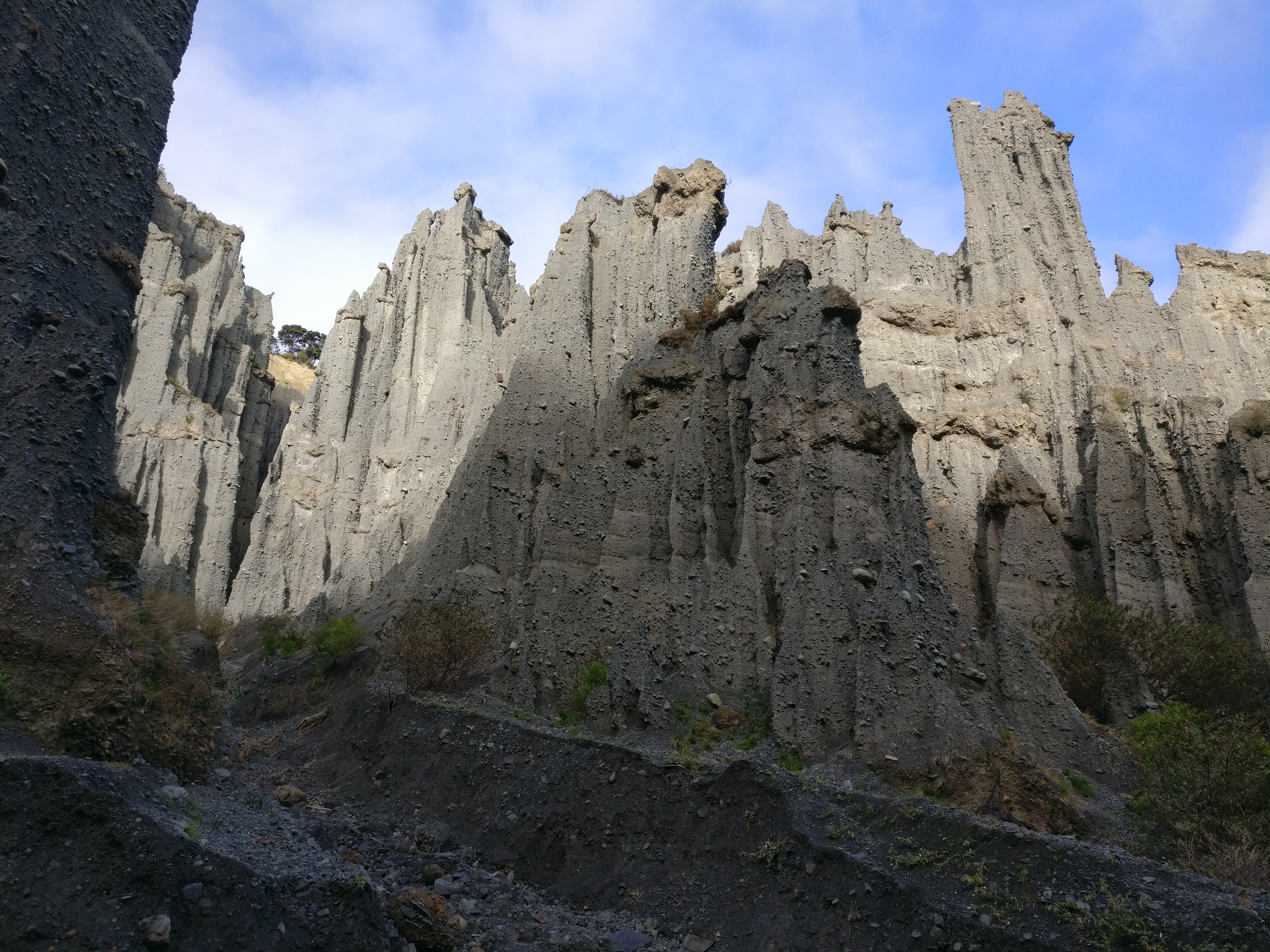
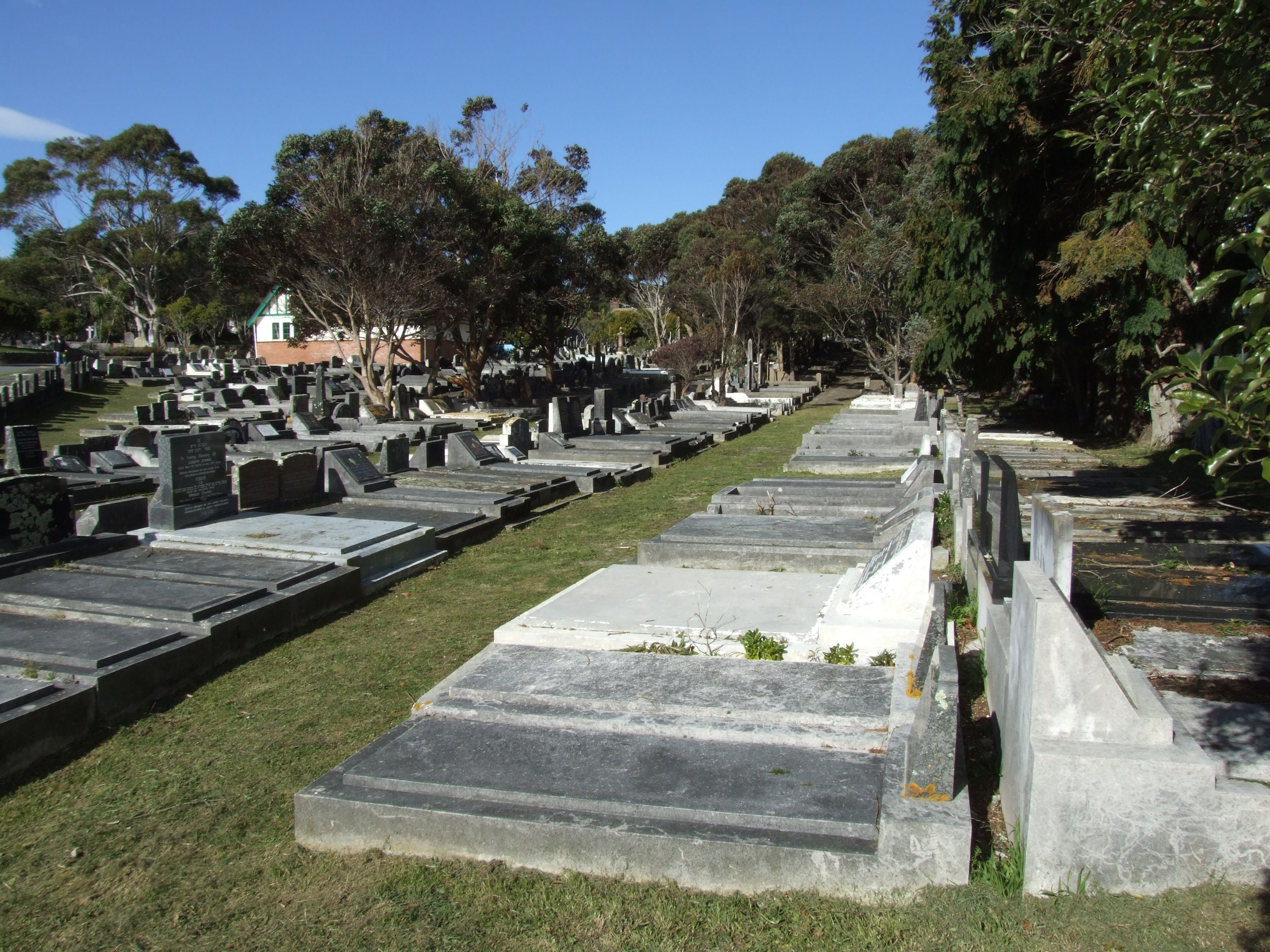
Pūtangirua Pinnacles (left) and Karori Cemetery (right), two filming locations used in Braindead

The film was mostly shot in and around Wellington's southern and western suburbs. Some filming locations include:

- Pūtangirua Pinnacles acts as Skull Island in the film.
- Wellington Zoo, Newtown.
- No. 12 Hinau Road, Hataitai, Wellington is Lionel's house in the movie.
- Karori Cemetery, Wellington.
- The store where Lionel and Paquita first meet at 29 Sutherland Rd, Melrose, Wellington, on the corner of Rodrigo Road and Sutherland Road.
- The park used in the scene with Lionel and Selwyn was filmed in the children's play area of the Wellington Botanical Gardens.
- A Fieldair Freight DC-3 lands at Wellington International Airport.
- Queens Drive, Lyall Bay, Wellington.
- Lionel goes to the veterinary clinic located on 20 Standen St, Karori, Wellington.

== Release ==
Braindead released on 13 August 1992 in New Zealand. It was subsequently released in the United States on 12 February 1993 under the title Dead Alive and grossed $23,765 in its opening weekend. It eventually grossed $242,623 in the country. The soundtrack was released in 1992 by Mana Music.

The film has had several releases on VHS, Laserdisc, and DVD around the world. It was first released on Blu-ray as Dead Alive by Lionsgate in October 2011, with the US 97-minute cut. The uncut 104-minute version remained unavailable in many parts of the world as most releases went out of print, preserved mostly by fan-made restorations and bootleg copies. In December 2018, Peter Jackson announced that he plans to restore Braindead, along with his previous films Bad Taste and Meet the Feebles for a 4K release. On 11 October 2025, the 4K restoration of Braindead premiered at the Dark Nights Film Festivial in Sydney, Australia. The remaster was shown again at the 59th Sitges Film Festival in October 2026.

=== Alternate versions ===
The film was released in a number of different versions. In some nations, such as the United Kingdom and Australia, the 104-minute film was shown in full. In fact, the UK's British Board of Film Classification (BBFC) found the film's gory content so light-hearted and comical that there was consideration on giving the film a 15 certificate, which would have granted it to be seen by a much younger audience. They ultimately decided to give the film an 18 rating because the amount of gore confounded the expectations of a 15 rating.

In countries where the censors balked at the extreme gore, the film was initially banned or left unrated before being heavily cut. In Germany, a 94-minute version was seen with major cuts to some of the film's grislier scenes but was widely ignored. A FSK 16 rated version was released in Germany under the American title Dead Alive, omitting almost the entirety of the violence. The uncut version, as well as several cut versions, are banned in Germany. It is also illegal to publicly exhibit the film in Germany. The gory violence has also caused the film to be banned in South Korea, Singapore, and Finland. However, the film was unbanned and released uncut in the latter country in 2001.

In the United States, the film was released as Dead Alive, because of another film with rights to the practically identical title Brain Dead. There were two versions released in the country; the unrated cut is 97 minutes, and the R-rated version is only 85 minutes with many of the gore scenes removed.

== Critical reception ==
On review aggregator website Rotten Tomatoes, the film holds an approval rating of 89% based on 46 reviews, with a weighted average rating of 7.50/10. The site's critical consensus reads, "The delightfully gonzo tale of a lovestruck teen and his zombified mother, Dead Alive is extremely gory and exceedingly good fun, thanks to Peter Jackson's affection for the tastelessly sublime." Metacritic rated it 54 out of 100 based on 7 reviews, indicating "mixed or average reviews".

At the time of its release, David Stratton, writing for Variety, gave a positive review, calling it "Jackson's best film to date" and praising its humour, acting, and technical qualities (gore effects, makeup). He stated "Kiwi gore specialist Peter Jackson, who goes for broke with an orgy of bad taste and splatter humor. Some will recoil from the gore, but Braindead wasn't made for them." Peter Rainer of the Los Angeles Times enjoyed the film, stating that it "is the most hilariously disgusting movie ever made. It makes something like Re-Animator seem like a UNESCO documentary about Mother Teresa." The film received a negative review from The Independent writer Quentin Curtis, who complained that "it never decides whether to make you tremble with laughter or fear, and has outstayed its welcome long before the last limb has been severed and entrail spilled." For Entertainment Weekly, Owen Gleiberman wrote that the film was "breezy and good-natured", giving praise to the gore special effects.

Retrospective reception was also positive. Braindead placed at number 91 in a top 100 list produced by Time Out magazine after conducting a poll with several authors, directors, actors and critics who have worked within the horror genre. Rotten Tomatoes lists the film on its 100 Best Zombie Movies, Ranked by Tomatometer. Simon Pegg, actor, comedian, and friend of Jackson, wrote in his autobiography Nerd Do Well: A Small Boy's Journey to Becoming a Big Kid that Braindead is one of the main influences on his 2004 zombie film Shaun of the Dead.

== Accolades ==
Year	Award	Category	Subject	Result	Ref.
1992	Fantafestival	Best Actor	Timothy Balme	Won	
1992	Fantafestival	Best Special Effects	—N/a	Won	
1992	Sitges Film Festival	Best Film	Peter Jackson	Nominated	
1992	Sitges Film Festival	Best Special Effects	Bob McCarron and Richard Taylor	Won	
1993	Amsterdam Fantastic Film Festival	Golden Scream Award	Peter Jackson	Won	
1993	Fantasporto	Best Film	Peter Jackson	Won	
1993	Fantasporto	Best Special Effects	Steve Ingram	Won	
1993	New Zealand Film and TV Awards	Best Film	Jim Booth	Won	
1993	New Zealand Film and TV Awards	Best Male Dramatic Performance	Timothy Balme	Won	
1993	New Zealand Film and TV Awards	Best Director	Peter Jackson	Won	
1993	New Zealand Film and TV Awards	Best Screenplay	Peter Jackson, Stephen Sinclair and Fran Walsh	Won	
1993	New Zealand Film and TV Awards	Best Contribution to Design	Richard Taylor	Won	
1993	Saturn Awards	Best Horror Film	Peter Jackson	Nominated	
1993	Saturn Awards	Best Special Effects	Bob McCarron and Richard Taylor	Nominated	
1994	Saturn Awards	Best Genre Video Release	—N/a	Won	

== See also ==
- 1992 in film
- Giant Rat of Sumatra
