= The Jaquie Brown Diaries =

- Created by: Gerard Johnstone; Jaquie Brown; Hayley Cunningham
- Directed by: Gerard Johnstone
- Starring: Jaquie Brown; Ryan Lampp; Hannah Banks; Madeleine Sami
- Country of origin: New Zealand
- No. of seasons: 2
- No. of episodes: 14

Production
- Executive producers: Gerard Johnstone; Jaquie Brown
- Camera setup: Single camera
- Running time: 23 minutes
- Production companies: Young, Gifted & Brown

Original release
- Network: TV3
- Release: 25 July 2008 – 11 December 2009

The Jaquie Brown Diaries is a satirical New Zealand sitcom in which real-life television personality Jaquie Brown plays a fictionalised, over-ambitious, status-obsessed version of herself. The series was created by Gerard Johnstone, Jaquie Brown and Hayley Cunningham and premiered 25 July 2008 on TV3. The US cable television channel Logo began broadcasting the series' episodes to date 12 June 2010.

== Themes ==
The show highlights the unglamorous reality of being a celebrity in New Zealand. It depicts fame as a game that can never be won. Jaquie's character is far from perfect. She's insecure, petulant and selfish, which makes her ultimately more human and relatable as a result.

== Development ==
Jaquie Brown and writer/director Gerard Johnstone first worked together on New Zealand music channel C4. In 2005 Brown left the station to become the quirky news reporter on Campbell Live. After hearing Jaquie's anxieties about her career, the pitfalls of being a minor celebrity, and being recognised by her gynaecologist, Johnstone came up with the idea of Brown playing herself in a sitcom which would parody voice-over narrated female skewed television shows such as 'Sex and the City' and 'Desperate Housewives'.

== Production ==
The Jaquie Brown Diaries was produced independently through Brown & Johnstone's own company, Young, Gifted & Brown. Jaquie Brown had never acted professionally or received any acting training. It was also the professional debut of writer/director/editor Gerard Johnstone. Many episodes of the series were co-written with Jodie Molloy, an ex-TV3 publicist. Hayley Cunningham produced the first series. The second series was produced by Matt McPhail.

== Acclaim ==
The show debuted to unanimously positive reviews. It was dubbed 'A miracle' by The Listener for the fact that it was a NZ sitcom 'that doesn't suck', an observation which drew on NZ's troubled past when it comes to narrative comedy. The first series won best comedy at the Qantas Film and Television Awards , was the top NZ show in The Herald's 'Best on the Box' for 2008, and was declared best local comedy or TV show in several publications such as The Listener, Metro magazine and Jaquie Brown was voted one of the New Zealanders of the year in both the NZ Herald and North and South magazine.

The second series was declared 'Best TV show on TV' by Steve Braunias in Sunday magazine.

In June 2010 it debuted in the US on MTV Logo. The Boston Globe's Matthew Gilbert called it 'delightfully cringeworthy' and said that it put other major network sitcoms to shame.

Both seasons won New Zealand's Qantas TV and Film Award for best comedy programme in 2009 and 2010.

== Series Summary ==
=== Series 1 ===
The first series was loosely based around many aspects of Brown's life, having just left music station C4, now working as the light-relief on a hard-hitting current affairs show, feeling a little in over her head in the world of journalism and having to deal with the pitfalls of being a C-grade celebrity. With the help of a young network publicist, Kim Sharee, Jaquie attempts to claw her way up the media ladder, but her efforts are thwarted by the arrival of a new reporter, Serita Singh, whose journalistic style is strikingly similar to Jaquie's and seems to be stealing her thunder at an alarming rate.

Over the course of the series, Jaquie's humanity takes a back seat to her ambition. In the episode finale, she frames Serita by attaining her computer log-in and sending a pornographic e-mail entitled 'A guy, a girl and a mug (Based on the infamous '2 girls 1 cup')' to Ian. Serita is fired, and Jaquie becomes Ian's new temporary replacement while Ian and Elena do a feature in Iraq. Jaquie is in over her head to begin with, as she bumbles her way through an interview with the Prime Minister, but she manages to regain her footing in the last segment by making a high school principal partake in a pop quiz with a dyslexic student. Although Jaquie finds herself on the receiving end of the fame and adoration she has always wanted, her conscience, and her useless yet perceptive flatmate Tom get the better of her, and she confesses to her sins. The closing scene sees her leaving TV3 but hopeful for a brighter future.

=== Series 2 AKA The Jaquie Brown Odyssey ===
The second series premiered on 25 October 2009. It is much darker in tone than the first series, and attempts a slightly more complex narrative structure as well as a more significant story arc. It also spends more time on the supporting characters, particularly Jaquie's publicist Kim Sharee and her flatmate Tom. The series aired in NZ as 'The Jaquie Brown Diaries series two' as the network were concerned a title change would confuse audiences, but the producers released the DVD under the original working title 'The Jaquie Brown Odyssey'.

Jaquie begins the second series as a washed up alcoholic, whoring her celebrity for 'The Carpet Warehouse'. Kim Sharee offers her a chance to get back into the network's good books by taking a slot on one of its umbrella radio stations 'Radio Hautaki' with James Coleman. Jaquie and James hate each other's guts but Jaquie has no alternatives, and despite James's protests, the station manager Derek thinks it's a great idea. This pairing continues the show's art imitating life theme, as Coleman and Brown were forced to work together on Coleman's short-lived breakfast show on Channel Z. Brown quit the show due to irreconcilable differences. They later buried the hatchet and Brown, Coleman and Johnstone would end up working together on C4.

Serita Singh continues to be a thorn in Jaquie's side. She has gone on to become the darling of the network, has a top ten covers album and even has her own sitcom coming out which even though it's a hit with audiences and critics alike. Jaquie soon forgets her reasons for getting back into broadcasting and is even more determined than ever before to outshine Serita. Eventually she achieves this goal when she goes on a celebrity reality show called 'Celebrity Frontiers' where celebrities must live as they did in early settler times. Audiences fall for Jaquie's antics and she is set to win the game. But when she gets the celebrities lost in the bush, they inadvertently stumble into a Maori militant training camp and are kidnapped and held hostage. The ordeal gets nationwide news coverage and when Jaquie rescues the hostages, she ends up becoming more famous than ever.

But the old Jaquie creeps back when she signs up with a new agent, despite the fact that Kim Sharee has quit her job to take care of Jaquie full-time. The two have a falling-out. Tom attempts to console Kim Sharee by offering her the chance to represent him and his aspirations to resurrect the sword and sorcery franchise with his script & screen test for 'Deathslayer 5'. Meanwhile, Jaquie's agent turns out to be a shark who negotiates such a high salary for Jaquie at the radio station that they have to fire James Coleman to afford it. Kim Sharee turns Tom's screen test for 'Deathslayer 5' into a YouTube phenomenon and Jaquie realises what a monumental mistake she's made by taking her for granted. She calls on Kim Sharee for help to get her out of her contract and she reluctantly agrees.

But Jaquie is unable to enjoy her new celebrity status largely due to the fact that Tom is usurping it with his internet stardom. She decides to Google herself and discovers a backlash. But when she responds to it, she's ridiculed on TV3's breakfast show 'Sunrise' and accosts the show's host Oliver Driver in a fish market and beats him down with a Hapuka. As a result, she loses her nomination as Metro Aucklander of the year. Tom takes her place and strikes up a romance with Serita. Meanwhile, the story about Jaquie trying to get Serita fired has been leaked. The next day it's all over the papers and Jaquie fears it's the end of her career. Kim promises she can fix it, but when Jaquie sees Tom with Serita, she loses the plot. She kicks Tom out of the flat and resents Kim for not telling her about it. In her depression she turns again to drink and drugs and goes on a 'celebrity booze binge of epic proportions'. Kim & Tom put her in rehab where she bumps into her old boss Ian McHuntly who is being treated for sex addiction (McHuntly was caught engaging in homosexual acts in a public toilet and publicly shamed at the beginning of the series just after he had offered Jaquie her old job back). He tells Jaquie he's not a sex addict, he was set up, but feels safer in rehab than he did on the outside.

While Jaquie is in rehab being treated for her irrational resentment towards Serita, Kim discovers that there is indeed something more sinister about the nation's favourite female presenter. After they mistakenly swap BlackBerrys, Kim takes a phone call that was intended for Serita from Randall, an ex-TV3 network executive, now TVNZ in-house producer, and learns that Serita is pitching a show to a rival network. Meanwhile, Tom has turned into an arrogant fame hungry monster with delusions of making it big in America. Kim warns him that they only own the web rights for Deathslayer, and if he makes a public appearance he'll be sued. Tom refuses to listen to Kim, and when Kim shows up at Serita's house to give her phone back, she overhears Serita manipulating Tom and smiting Kim's intentions. As Kim listens, she's set upon by Serita's guard dog Barry and manages to escape inside the backdoor just as Serita is walking Tom to his cab. Kim hides in Serita's attic, and sees a disturbing wall of magazine cut outs, self-affirmations, news articles and mutilated pictures of Jaquie. At the centre is Jaquie and Tom's own show prop 'Do celebrities have talent', which they had unsuccessfully pitched to Randall earlier in the series.

Just as Jaquie has made a breakthrough in rehab and no longer feels any animosity towards her enemy, Kim calls and tells her that Serita framed Ian so that she could get out of her McHuntly at 7 contract and that Serita is planning to pitch Jaquie's show to TVNZ in one hour. Jaquie escapes rehab and tries to stop Serita, but when she follows Serita into a darkly lit studio inside TVNZ, the lights come up on a partially built set for a show called 'Celebrity Talent Quest' and she realises she's too late. Serita reveals her dark side to Jaquie for the first time and Jaquie puts the pieces of her dastardly puzzle together. Serita admits to everything, and says there's nothing she can do about it, at which point Jaquie pulls out a dictaphone which has been recording the whole time. But before Jaquie can finish gloating Serita takes it from her and snaps the tape in half.

But just as Serita is about to leave Jaquie in defeat, Jaquie offers up an alternative. Instead of hosting the show, Jaquie proposes that they go head to head as contestants in the 'broadcasting battle of the century'. Serita accepts Jaquie's offer and they shake on it, at which point Serita assures Jaquie ominously that she always gets her way. The series concludes at this moment with the banner 'To be continued'.

== Cast and characters ==
=== Main characters ===
- Jaquie Brown

Jaquie Brown is an insecure and misguided TV reporter with an addiction to fame. She is prepared to do whatever it takes to increase her celebrity status, even if it means making some morally reprehensible decisions in the process.

- Serita Singh

Serita Singh (Madeleine Sami) is smart, resourceful and annoyingly beautiful, Singh threatens to destroy everything that Jaquie has not worked very hard for.

- Tom

Tom (Ryan Lampp) is Brown's freeloading flatmate who is pursuing a hopeless career as a stand-up comedian / actor / writer. While he might share Jaquie's lazy work ethic, he has a stronger moral code. Tom tries to remind Jaquie that there are more important things in life than status.

- Kim Sharee

Kim Sharee (Hannah Banks) is Jaquie's conniving network publicist. Like Jaquie, Kim Sharee is also a woman who puts her career before everything else. A great PR agent in the making, there is no task too difficult when it comes to getting the best for her stable of network show ponies.

- Ian McHuntly (Only a guest in series 2)

Ian McHuntly (Jonathan Brugh) is the host of McHuntly at 7. A consummate professional in the world of broadcasting with charm and charisma that requires several power naps a day to reboot. Off camera Ian also has a shocking vocabulary and a keen eye for the ladies.

- Elena (Series 1 only)

Elena (Geeling Ng) is the controlling producer of McHuntly at Seven. Elena rules with an iron fist and chooses to be feared rather than loved.

- James Coleman (Series 2 only)

James has been forced to share his midday radio show with Jaquie to 'soften the edges a bit'. Like Jaquie, James Coleman is an ex-TV presenter with a lot of talent but not a lot of luck. He's even more bitter and volatile than Jaquie is but despite their similarities they hate each other with a passion, although they do occasionally bond over a mutual disdain for the intern, Nannette.

- Nannette (Series 2 only)

Nannette (Florence Noble ) is a sweet but very mousey intern at the radio station who tries her hardest to please James and Jaquie. She desperately wants to make a career for herself in radio but she lacks spark and confidence, or as Jaquie less tactfully puts it, is 'a lighter shade of beige'.

=== Guest characters ===
- Terence Ben'et (Rhys Darby)

An incredibly handsome and charming NZ actor who has achieved acclaim in Hollywood and also happens to be Tom's older brother.

- Randall (Jeff Szusterman)

The network executive at TV3, turned in-house producer at TVNZ. Loosely based on Jaquie's real life ex-boss Andrew Szusterman and played by his brother Jeff. Randall is rude, arrogant and difficult to have a conversation with.

- Brendo & Brooksy (Brendhan Lovegrove and Geoff Houtman)

Based on a concoction of irritating morning radio DJs, Brendo & Brooksy form the breakfast team 'The Morning monkeys' on Radio Hautaki.

=== Celebrity cameos ===
- Vanilla Ice (Deleted scene on DVD)
- Rhys Darby
- Matt Costa
- Helen Clark / The Prime Minister of New Zealand
- Mark Sainsbury
- Shavaughn Ruakere
- Rodney Hide
- Jo Cotton
- Petra Bagust
- Dave Gibson
- Carly Binding
- Mike Puru
- Phil Bostwick
- Antony Starr
- Anika Moa
- Jon Bridges
- Jackie Clarke
- Bill Ralston
- Brooke Howard-Smith
- Claire Chitham
- Joel Tobeck
- Awen Guttenbiel
- Rikki Morris
- Helena McAlpine
- John Cocks (Cocksy)
- Oliver Driver
- Carly Flynn
- Rod Cheeseman
- Kate Hawkesby
- Karl Burnett
- Taika Waititi

== Music ==
A significant factor in the show's popularity is its use of popular music, something which is largely uncommon in NZ dramas due to high licensing costs. To date The Jaquie Brown Diaries is the only NZ drama or comedy that utilises both international and New Zealand commercial music. Below is a list of songs used in the series.

=== Season 1 ===
- Yo Majesty – "Hey There Girl" (Replaced "Put your back into it" by Ice Cube from orig. TV airing) (USA)
- The La De Da's – "How Is the Air Up There".
- The Reduction Agents – "The Pool".
- Rikki Morris – "Nobody Else" (Replaced "More than this" by Roxy Music from orig. TV airing).
- Opensouls – "1,2,3,4,5".
- T'Pau – "Heart & Soul" (UK).
- Space Waltz – "Out on the Street".
- Coconut Rough – "Sierra Leone".
- CSS – "Let's Make Love And Listen To Death From Above" (Brazil).
- The Mint Chicks – "Welcome To Nowhere".
- Julien Dyne – "Scissorhands".
- Anika Moa – "Dreams in My Head".
- Frank Harris – "Hold on to the Vision" (Replaced 'Fame' by Irene Cara from orig. TV airing) (USA).
- The Veils – "Calliope".
- Opensouls – "Intro".
- Charlie ASH – "Blood Red Sleeve".
- Charlie ASH – "O'Baby (Module Remix)".
- The Reduction Agents – "Cabinets & Mountaintops".
- The Veils – "Advice For Young Mothers To Be".
- SJD – "I Am The Radio".
- The Phoenix Foundation – "Bright Grey".

=== Season 2 ===
- Madeleine Sami – "Escaping" (from original version by Margaret Urlich).
- Kajagoogoo – "Too Shy" (UK).
- Passion Pit – "Moth's Wings (USA).
- One Block Radius – "Loud And Clear" (USA).
- Golden Silvers – "True Romance" (UK).
- Golden Harvest – "I Need Your Love".
- Ra Ra Riot – "Ghost Under Rocks (Passion Pit Remix) (USA).
- Push Push – "Trippin".
- Bang Bang Eche – "Four to the Floor".
- Cobra Khan – "Graze The Earth".
- Skid Row – "I Remember You" (USA).
- Oh Mercy – "Lay Everything on Me" (Australia).
- Giant – "I'll See You in My Dreams" (USA).
- The Tutts – "All About Town".
- Choir of Young Believers – "Next Summer" (Denmark).
- Pop Levi – "Blue Honey" (UK).

=== Theme song ===
The theme song for the show is performed by James Milne, frontman for The Reduction Agents and Lawrence Arabia.

== Budget ==
The first series was funded under a short-lived NZ On Air 'innovation' scheme which produced a handful of low-budget programs between 2007 and 2008. The first series was made for NZ$645,068. However, despite its budget restraints, it was the first NZ drama to be shot and broadcast in HD. The second series received NZ$1.3 million from NZ On Air.

== List of episodes ==
=== Series 1 ===
- 1.1 Brownie Points

When the producers of McHuntly at 7 hire a new Fijian-Indian reporter by the name of 'Serita Singh' who also seems to specialise in 'quirk', Jaquie discovers she's been scoring low with ethnic minorities and attempts to do something about it.

- 1.2 Brown in the Dumps

Jaquie finds herself exploiting her celebrity for cash when she moves into a new house she can't afford.

- 1.3 Brown Sweat

When Jaquie is put on a major ad campaign to support NZ Olympians, she tries to lose weight by any means necessary.

- 1.4 Brown Love

Jaquie looks for some celebrity love to improve her chances of getting on the cover of a Woman's magazine.

- 1.5 The Brown Identity

Jaquie is continually mistaken for Jackie Clarke, but when it results in her losing her invite to the fashion event of the year, their mutual disdain for each other reaches boiling point.

- 1.6 Brown Live

When Ian and Elena choose Serita as Ian's replacement host for the live show while they cover a story in Iraq, Jaquie decides it's the last straw.

=== Series 2 ===
- 2.1 The Jaquie Brown Odyssey

After losing her job on McHuntly at 7, Jaquie tries desperately to climb back up the media ladder, but her only available option is a co-hosting gig on radio Hautaki with James Coleman.

- 2.2 Brown Ambition

When Serita's terrible new sitcom is a critical and commercial success, Jaquie is outraged and tries to pitch her own show, but realises coming up with a good idea is a lot harder than she thought.

- 2.3 Night on the Brown

Jaquie is charmed by a dashing Hollywood / NZ actor and tries to capitalise on the encounter when they both attend the inaugural 42 below Winter Wonderland party.

- 2.4 Brown's Bush

Jaquie accepts an offer as a last minute replacement on a reality show called Celebrity Frontiers where the contestants must live as they did in early settler times.

- 2.5 Brown's Bush Pt 2

The reality show becomes a little too real when the celebrities get stranded in the bush, but the harsh elements and lack of food are not their only concern.

- 2.6 Brown Hearted

Jaquie and Kim have a falling-out when Jaquie signs with a new agent.

- 2.7 Brownward Spiral

Jaquie responds to an internet forum about her and it sets in motion a chain of events that put her back on the path to self-destruction.

- 2.8 – Educating Jaquie

Jaquie finds herself in Celebrity rehab and is reunited with her old boss Ian McHuntly. Meanwhile Kim uncovers some dark secrets about Serita.
