= The End of the Golden Weather =

Play by Bruce Mason

- Written by: Bruce Mason
- Subject: Depression
- Genre: Drama
- Setting: Depression era New Zealand

Premiere
- Date: 1960

The End of the Golden Weather is a play by Bruce Mason about a boy's loss of innocence in Depression-era New Zealand. It was written for solo performance by the author but can be performed by an ensemble and was made into an award-winning feature film directed by Ian Mune in 1991. It was workshopped in 1959 and first performed for the public in 1960. The script was published in 1962 and again in 1970 after Mason had performed it more than 500 times. In 1963 he performed it at the Edinburgh Festival.

Set in the fictitious beachfront township of Te Parenga on Auckland's North Shore in the 1930s, the main character is a nameless boy of about 12 (called Geoff in the film), based on the young Mason and a man from his childhood.

The play is in four parts:

Sunday at Te Parenga
The night of the riots
Christmas at Te Parenga
The made man

In the first half the boy spies on an abortive riot by his unemployed neighbours, and sees them and the local policeman in a new light. In the second, he befriends and tries to help a mentally challenged young man who has taken the name of a famous boxer, Firpo. Firpo wants to run in the Olympic Games and challenges local youths to a race on the beach, which he loses disastrously. Firpo is institutionalised, and the boy's greater understanding of the world's injustices is symbolized by the decay of the broom flowers at the site of Firpo's demolished bach at the end of summer.

Mason took the play's title from that of a novel the narrator in Thomas Wolfe's The Web and the Rock had wanted to write ( p 12). It has become a cliche in New Zealand for the end of summer.

An earlier version of the play was serialised in 1949 as a novella over two parts in literary journal Landfall under the title "Summer's End".

== The End of the Golden Weather (1991 film) ==
The 1991 film was directed and co-produced by Ian Mune, who also wrote the screenplay with the cooperation of Bruce Mason, although the film was finally made after Mason's death. The film, 104 minutes long, was made with a budget of $NZ3 million, and shot on Te Muri Beach, Takapuna beach and Takapuna Grammar School. Helen Martin says that the film keeps to the spirit of the play, although Mune chose to leave out the Depression aspects (e.g. the 1932 Queen Street riots) and concentrate on the Geoff and Firpo story.
