= Kevin Milne =

New Zealand television presenter

Kevin Milne ONZM
- Born: 18 March 1949 (age 77)
- Occupation: Television presenter
- Spouse: Linda Milne
- Children: 4

Kevin John Milne ONZM (born 18 March 1949) is a New Zealand television presenter, best known for hosting the show Fair Go from 1983 to 2010.

== Fair Go ==
Milne has been part of Fair Go since 1983, the show first starting in 1977. He is known for a confrontational style and asking difficult questions.

Milne announced his retirement mid-2010 and his last show (the 2010 Fair Go Ad Awards) screened live on 20 October 2010.

== Other programmes ==
He has also worked on the following programmes:

- BBC-TV
- Visnews
- Production Line
- Then Again
- Holiday
- Kev Can Do

In 1996 Milne appeared on an episode of the soap opera Shortland Street, as himself, confronting the character Nick Harrison in a Fair Go episode.

In 2009 Milne appeared on the New Zealand travel programme Intrepid Journeys with a trip made to Ukraine in December 2008-January 2009.

== Honours and awards ==
In the 2007 Queen's Birthday Honours, Milne was appointed an Officer of the New Zealand Order of Merit, for services to broadcasting and the community.

"It's no coincidence that this has happened at the time of the 30th anniversary of Fair Go. The honour is not only for the time I spent on Fair Go, but it's also for all the people who've been part of the show over the years. It's a remarkable show that's lasted a fantastically long time, and it's astonishing how many have worked on it." - Kevin Milne

He also won two Qantas Media Awards for Best Presenter.

In November 2026 he was presented with the Scroll of Honour from the Variety Artists Club of New Zealand for his contribution to New Zealand entertainment.

== Personal life ==
Milne lives in the Kapiti Coast near Wellington. He had a valve replacement as part of heart surgery in October 2004, and was diagnosed with a brain tumour in mid-2009, which required surgery the following year. In September 2020, Milne announced that he had been diagnosed with prostate cancer.

Milne is a former student of St Bede's College, Christchurch.

== See also ==
- List of New Zealand television personalities
