= This Way of Life =

- Theatrical release poster
- Directed by: Thomas Burstyn
- Produced by: Barbara Sumner-Burstyn
- Cinematography: Thomas Burstyn
- Edited by: Cushla Dillon
- Music by: Joel Haines
- Production company: Cloud South Films
- Release date: 3 October 2009 (VIFF)
- Running time: 88 minutes
- Country: New Zealand
- Language: English

This Way of Life is a New Zealand documentary film about a horse breeding family living in the wild near the Ruahine Ranges, resisting the call to a more "modern" lifestyle. It was directed by Thomas Burstyn and produced by Barbara Sumner-Burstyn.

It opened theatrically in Vancouver on 3 October 2009 at the Vancouver International Film Festival; in Seattle on 11 June 2010 at the Seattle International Film Festival, and in New York City on 30 July 2010. It opened in Los Angeles on 6 August 2010 at the 14th Annual DocuWeeks.

This Way of Life made the 2011 Oscar Documentary short list.

== Cast ==
- Peter Ottley-Karena
- Colleen Ottley-Karena
- Llewelyn Ottley-Karena
- Aurora Ottley-Karena
- Malachi Ottley-Karena
- Elias Ottley-Karena
- Corban Ottley-Karena
- Salem Ottley-Karena

== See also ==
- List of films about horses
