= Russian Snark =

- Directed by: Stephen Sinclair
- Written by: Stephen Sinclair
- Produced by: Liz DiFiore
- Starring: Elena Stejko; Stephen Papps; Stephanie Tauevihi; Peter Rowley; Rene Naufahu; Te Waimarie Kessell
- Cinematography: Steve Latty
- Edited by: Paul Maxwell; Wayne Cook
- Music by: Stephen Gallagher; David Long
- Release date: 20 July 2010
- Running time: 78 minutes
- Country: New Zealand
- Languages: English; Russian

Russian Snark is a 2010 New Zealand film directed and written by Stephen Sinclair and produced by Liz DiFiore. The film features Stephen Papps, Elena Stejko, Stephanie Tauevihi and Te Waimarie Kessell. It is the story of Misha, a Russian filmmaker, and his struggles to make a movie in Godzone. It is the directorial debut of New Zealand writer Stephen Sinclair.

== Plot ==
Misha (Stephen Papps), a once-celebrated filmmaker who has fallen on hard times, resolves to leave his homeland in search of a film-friendly country where he can pursue his career. With his wife Nadia (Elena Stejko) in tow he sets sail from Russia in a tiny lifeboat, drifting across the Pacific to finally arrive in New Zealand.

Before long Misha realises that New Zealand is no more receptive to his ideas and aesthetic than Russia. Yet he perseveres with his experimental film, ignoring his wife's pleas to find work. Misha increasingly withdraws into himself, and his relationship with Nadia collapses.

Alone, his obsessions take hold and he steadily descends into madness. Only a chance encounter with a young Polynesian woman saves him from the ultimate act of self-destruction. His friendship with Roseanna (Stephanie Tauevihi) inspires a re-awakening, as he begins to reconnect with the world around him.

== Cast ==
- Stephen Papps as Misha: a Russian film auteur whose career has long since stalled.
- Elena Stejko as Nadia: wife and muse of the tortured artist. Elena brings authenticity to the role that is at times haunting and heart-warming.
- Stephanie Tauevihi as Roseanna: a young Polynesian woman who develops a friendship with Misha.
- Rene Naufahu as Vincent, a sleazy nightclub manager.
- Peter Rowley as Neville, the foul-tempered and philandering husband of Roseanna.
- Greg Johnson as a Chicken Farmer
- Te Waimarie Kessell as Lani, the daughter of Roseanna.
- Ethan Tauevihi as Tama, the son of Roseanna.
Cast in Russian Snark

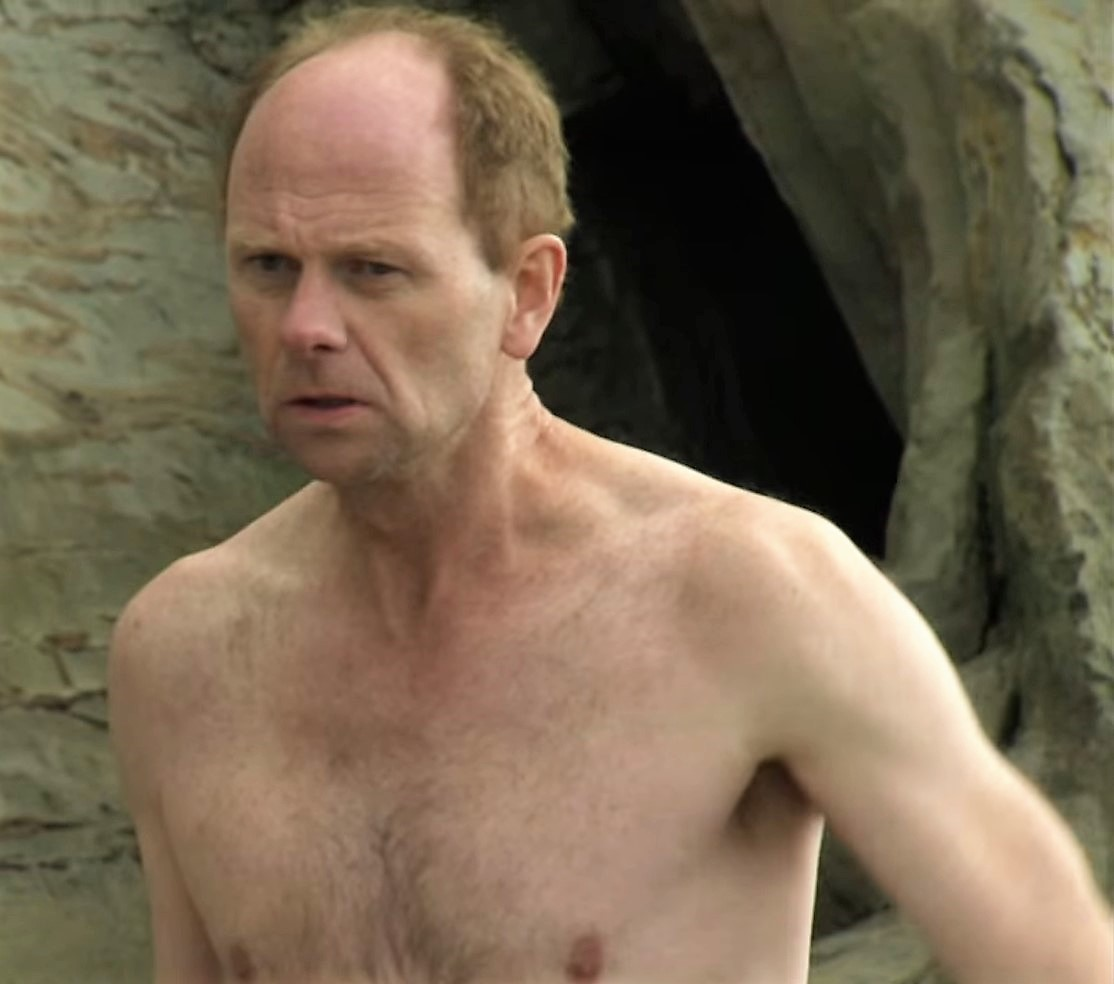
Stephen Papps

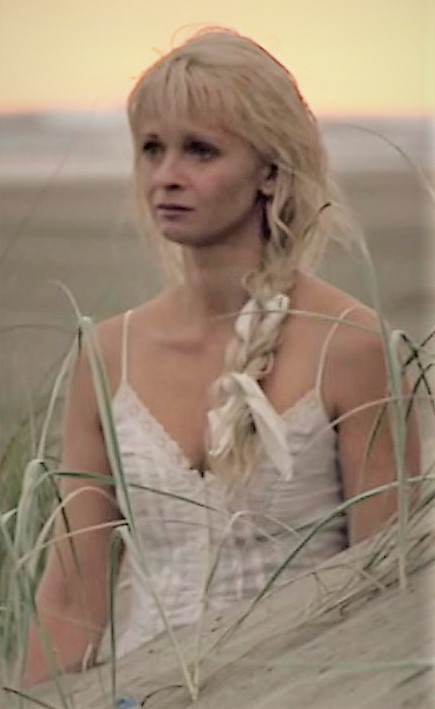
Elena Stejko

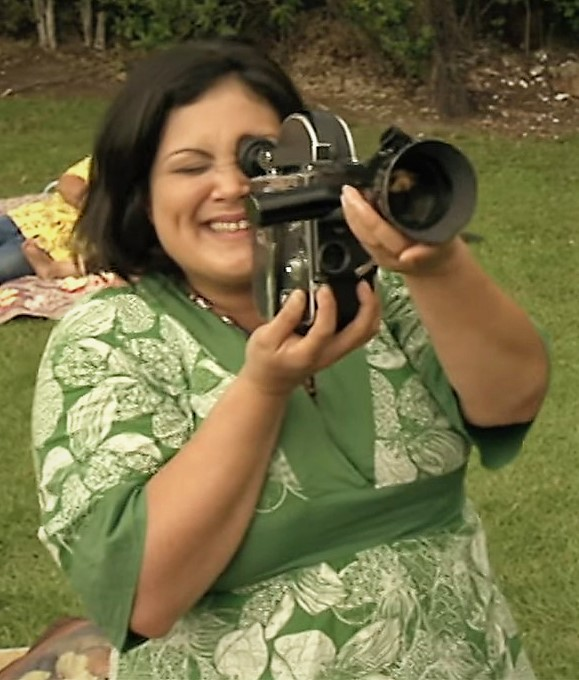
Stephanie Tauevihi

== Release ==
Russian Snark had its world premiere at the New Zealand International Film Festival on 20 July 2010. It was also presented as a part of the Moscow International Film Market in June 2010.

4 June 2011 – Russian Snark screens at the Wairoa Maori Film Festival – Nuhaka Marae, Wairoa – Matariki/

16 June 2011 – Screenings begin nationwide for Russian Snark

16 June 2011 – Russian Snark opens in Auckland, New Zealand at the Rialto in Newmarket – Q & A with Steven Sinclair

18 June 2011 – Russian Snark Q & A at the Art House Cinema, New Plymouth with Stephen Sinclair

19 June 2011 – Russian Snark Q & A at the Paramount Cinema, Wellington with Stephen Sinclair.

== Awards ==
Russian Snark has been nominated for 6 awards at The Qantas Film and Television Awards 2010. Stephen Sinclair nominated for Best Director, Stephen Papps nominated for Best Actor, Elena Stejko nominated for Best Actress, Stephanie Tauevihi nominated for Best Supporting Actress, Stephen Gallagher and David Long nominated for Best Music, and Park Road Post nominated for Best Visual Effects.

April 2011 – Russian Snark garners Best International Film Award at the Garden State Film Festival

December 2010 – Three nomination at the US-based indie pictures Maverick Movie Awards – Best Actor – Stephen Papps – Best Supporting Actress – Elena Stejko (up against Joan Rivers) and Best Original Soundtrack – David Long and Stephen Gallagher!

October 2010 – Russian Snark is an Official Selection at the Mumbai Film Festival, and the Carmel Art and Film Festival in California Effects.
