= Jaquie Brown =

New Zealand TV presenter, actress and radio presenter

- Born: England
- Occupations: TV presenter; Actress; Radio presenter

Jaquie Brown is a New Zealand TV presenter, actress and radio presenter.

== Biography ==
Brown was born in England in 1975 and moved to New Zealand when she was fifteen.

Brown volunteered at bFM when she was eighteen, carrying out a variety of tasks, including presenting radio shows and hosting talkback. Her first television appearance was the late-night TV show Space on TV2, which she co-hosted for three seasons with Dominic Bowden and then Hugh Sundae. Brown has also been a reporter for TV3's Campbell Live, a presenter for C4 Music, and a guest reporter for TV3's Nightline.

Brown co-created and starred in a New Zealand sitcom, The Jaquie Brown Diaries, as a fictionalised version of herself. The show won several awards, including Best Comedy, Best TV Show on TV and Best Local TV Show.

Brown presented at the New Zealand Music Awards as well as being the Television Tutor for New Zealand's Next Top Model.

== See also ==
- List of New Zealand television personalities
