= Stephanie Tauevihi =

New Zealand actress

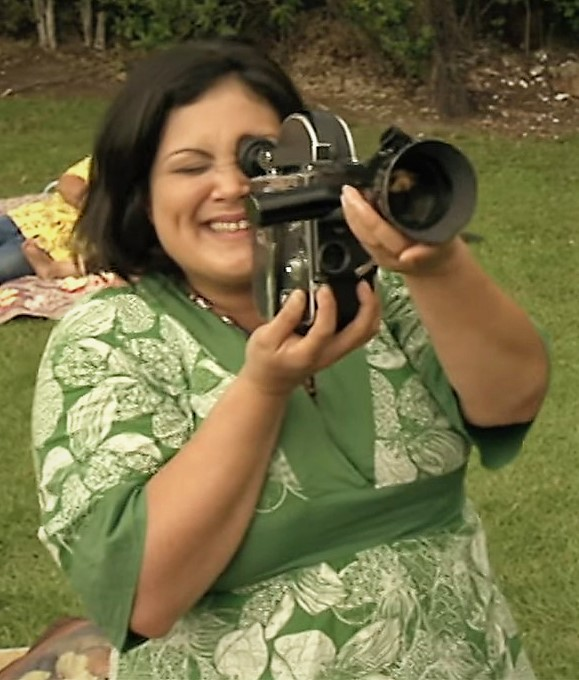
- Tauevihi in Russian Snark, 2010
- Born: Stephanie Ann Tauevihi
- Occupations: Singer songwriter Television actress
- Known for: Shortland Street

Stephanie Ann Tauevihi is a New Zealand songwriter, singer and actress, known for her work as the fictional character, Donna Heka, in the New Zealand television series Shortland Street. She also played a Real estate Agent in one episode of short-lived NZ program Rude Awakenings. She has provided songs and vocals for New Zealand band Strawpeople.

== Career ==
Tauevihi began her career on radio station Mai FM, and entered television as a presenter for the youth television show Infocus. She has sung with and provided vocals for band Strawpeople, for which work she received a 1995 nomination for 'Best Female Vocalist' at the New Zealand Music Awards.

Stephanie appeared on The Masked Singer NZ as a "Pavlova", a type of New Zealand dessert. Stephanie was eliminated in the semifinal.

== Activism ==
As a health promoter for 'Waiora Healthcare PHO' in West Auckland, she is active in efforts to address addiction to drugs and alcohol in New Zealand, and supports the organization 'Be Free'. When Cyclone Heta caused widespread damage in Niue in 2004, she used her high profile position to persuade companies to provide relief. She also actively supports 'Youth Pride' in its efforts to get at-risk children off the streets of South Auckland.

== Filmography ==
- In-Focus (1992)
- Shortland Street (1997–2004) as Donna Heka
- Thinking About Sleep (1999) as Lucy
- Look Who's Famous Now (1999) as herself
- Happy Birthday 2 You (2000) as Donna Heka
- Rude Awakenings (1 episode, 2007)
- Russian Snark (2010) as Roseanna
- Rest for the Wicked (2011) as Renata
- Blue Murder Motel (2026) as Maxine

== Recognition ==
=== Awards and nominations ===
- 1995, Nominated 'Best Female Vocalist' at New Zealand Music Awards
- 2000, Won 'Best Supporting Actress' at the New Zealand Television Awards for her work in Shortland Street.
- 2010, Won 'Best Supporting Actress in a Feature Film' at the Qantas Awards for her work in Russian Snark
