= Stephen Sinclair =

New Zealand playwright, screenwriter and novelist

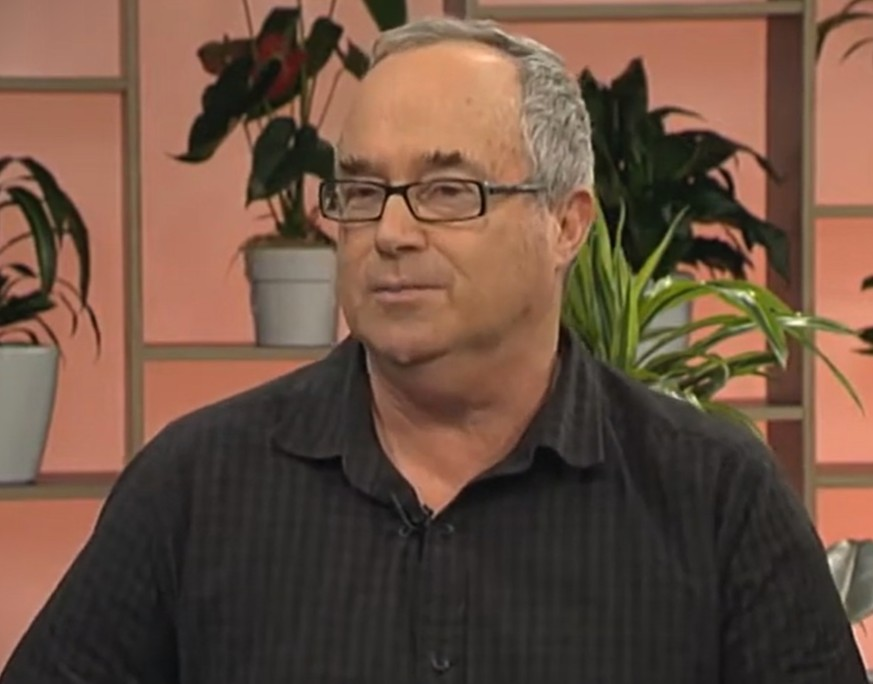
Sinclair in 2017

Stephen Sinclair is a New Zealand playwright, screenwriter and novelist. He is the co-author of stage comedy Ladies Night. In 2001, the French version won the Molière Award for stage comedy of the year. Other plays include The Bellbird and The Bach, both of which are prescribed texts for Drama Studies in New Zealand secondary schools.

He has co-written several films with Peter Jackson and Fran Walsh, notably Meet The Feebles, Braindead, and The Lord of the Rings: The Two Towers. He also wrote and directed the feature film Russian Snark, which premiered at the 2010 New Zealand Film Festival in Auckland, and won numerous international awards.

Sinclair has written the novels Thief of Colours (Penguin Books, 1995), and Dread (Spineless Press, 2000), and a book of poetry, The Dwarf and the Stripper (2003).

== Plays ==
- Le Matau (The Fish Hook) (1984), co-written with journalist Samson Samasoni. Premiered at New Depot Theatre, Wellington, in February 1984, directed by Stephen Sinclair and Helen Jarroe The play tells the story of Ioane, who leaves Samoa to work in New Zealand to support his family, but faces pressures to conform to Pākehā ways of doing things. Also one of the earliest bi-lingual New Zealand plays.
- Ladies Night, co-authored with Anthony McCarten, 1987.
- Big Bickies (1990), a musical satire about an ordinary family winning the Lotto.
- Caramel Cream (1991) depicting a relationship between a Māori teenager and his Pākehā social worker.
- Drawer of Knives
- Success (2015)
- Remain in Light, (2017)
- Intimacies
- The Bach, set in the Coromandel, shows family disintegration as two brothers and their wives spend time at the beach, while two of them are trying to write a script about iwi history.
- The Bellbird (2002), in which a 19th-century Pākehā woman marries a Māori man; set in Marlborough.

== Awards and festivals ==
=== Short films ===
- Ride: Selected for the Montreal Film Festival in 2004.

=== Feature films ===
- Russian Snark: Nominated for 6 awards at the Qantas Film and Television Awards in 2010, including Best Director.
- The Lord of the Rings: The Two Towers: Won the PFCS Award for Best Screenplay — Adapted at the Phoenix Film Critics Society Awards in 2003. Won the Nebula Award for Best Script at the Science Fiction and Fantasy Writers of America Awards in 2004.
- Braindead: Won Best Screenplay at the New Zealand Film and Television Awards in 1993.
