= Lisa Chappell =

New Zealand actor (born 1968)

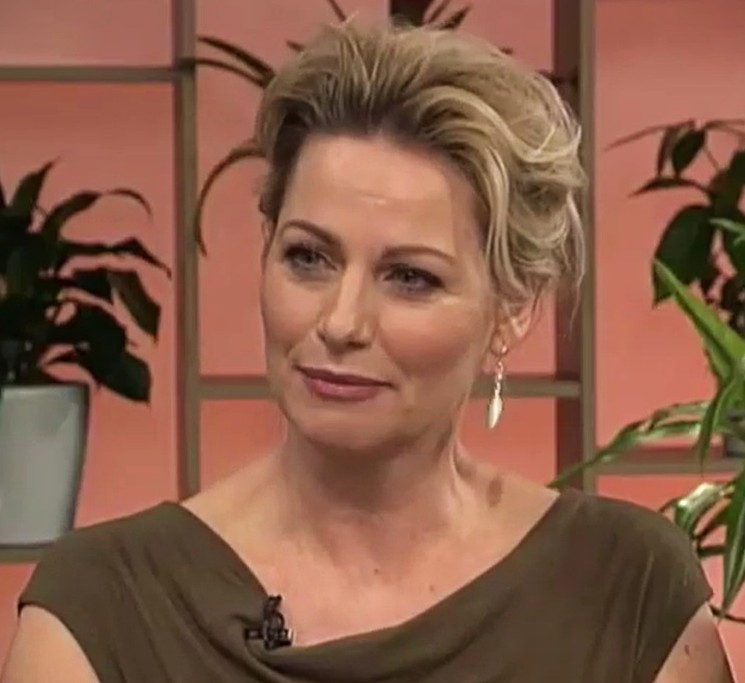
- Chappell in 2017
- Born: Lisa Irene Chappell; 18 October 1968 (age 58); Takapuna, Auckland, New Zealand
- Occupations: Actress, singer
- Years active: 1987–present
- Notable work: Gloss (1987–1990); McLeod's Daughters (2001–2003)
- Height: 1.74 m (5 ft 9 in)
- Spouse: Chris Taylor (m. 2001; div. 2005)
- Awards: Logie Award for Most Popular New Female Talent (2002); Logie Award for Most Popular Actress (2004); Qantas Film and Television Awards (2010); (See all awards)
- Website: www.lisachappell.net

Lisa Irene Chappell (born 18 October 1968) is a New Zealand actress and musician. She is known for her roles as Chelsea Redfern in Gloss (1987–1990), and as Claire McLeod in McLeod's Daughters (2001–2003), a performance which earned her two Logie Awards, for Most Popular New Female Talent and Most Popular Actress.

As one of New Zealand's most prominent theatre performers, Chappell made her stage debut in 1991, having appeared in The Merchant of Venice, which led to numerous roles, including Chicago, Hamlet, Design for Living, and The Thirty-Nine Steps. Following the establishment of her own company, Chappell has made appearances in more contemporary works, in addition to producing and writing.

While maintaining her continued success on screen, Chappell has had also appeared in films, such as Desperate Remedies (1993), Jack Brown Genius (1996), and Coffin Rock (2009), and further television roles, in City Life (1996–1998), The Cult (2009), Zombies 4: Dawn of the Vampires (2025) for which she was the recipient of a Qantas Film and Television Award for Best Performance by a Supporting Actress – General Television, and most recently as Michelle Beaufort in the soap opera, Shortland Street (2020–2022).

== Early life ==
Lisa Chappell was born in Takapuna, Auckland, New Zealand and grew up in Mairangi Bay. She has two older siblings, a brother, Mark, and a sister, Catherine. Chappell studied acting in the 1980s, and was educated at Rangitoto College, where she took drama classes and performed in school musicals, as well as singing and dancing tuition.

== Career ==
=== Television ===
Chappell's big break came in the late 1980s when she was a student, and while in Christchurch attending a Fringe Festival, she was lodging with Michelle Hine, who was teaching clown at the time, when Chappell was offered to audition for the upcoming television drama, Gloss. Hine coached her for the part, which she eventually received. Chappell made her on-screen debut in 1987 when she was cast as Chelsea Redfern in the TV2 series which lasted three seasons, until 1990. This was followed by a short stint in the police procedural series, Shark in the Park, and guest roles in shows, such as, soap opera Shortland Street, Mysterious Island, and multiple roles on Hercules: The Legendary Journeys. In 1996, she began appearing in a regular role on the short-lived TV2 soap opera, City Life, as Bronwyn Kellett.

In 1998, Chappell had relocated to Australia and completed "The Journey" program at the Actors Centre Australia in Sydney, Australia, graduating in 2000. After which, she auditioned for the role of Claire McLeod on the Nine Network rural drama series, McLeod's Daughters, a role which was originally intended for actor Laurie Foell during which Chappell was in the process of establishing a theatre company; she successfully secured the role following her audition. During production of the series, Chappell gained the skills in how to ride a horse and sheering sheep, and also made the decision to become a vegetarian. She appeared in the series for three seasons, from 2001 to 2003, before her character was killed off in a car accident. For her performance, Chappell was nominated for several Logie Awards, receiving two, for Most Popular New Female Talent and Most Popular Actress in 2002 and 2004, respectively, and has gained a cult following among both Australian and international audiences.

Chappell continued in Australian television, and would later appear in a recurring role on the police drama, Stingers, as Constable Megan Walsh for its eighth and final season, the television film, Small Claims: The Reunion, the serial drama The Cult, in a role with earned her a Qantas Film and Television Award, and guest appearances in Rescue: Special Ops and Cops L.A.C..

In 2020, Chappell returned to Shortland Street, and was cast in the regular role of Michelle Beaufort.

In 2024, it was announced that Chappell would be appearing in a supporting role in the upcoming television film sequel Zombies 4: Dawn of the Vampires, which is set to premiere on Disney+ and Disney Channel in 2025.

=== Film ===
Chappell made her film debut in the 1993 critically acclaimed drama film Desperate Remedies, in a supporting role, alongside Jennifer Ward-Lealand and Kevin Smith. She also appeared in the Jack Brown Genius in 1996, a film written and produced by Peter Jackson, and the 2009 psychological thriller Coffin Rock, with Robert Taylor and Sam Parsonson. Chappell also appeared in the 2017 horror film Out of the Shadows.

=== Theatre ===
Chappell is a well established theatre performer, having appeared in numerous stage productions for more three decades, and has worked extensively in New Zealand, particularly with the Auckland Theatre Company. Early in her career, she appeared in classical theatre productions, including William Shakespeare's The Merchant of Venice, the musical, Chicago, and Arthur Miller's All My Sons. She has also directed and performed in two plays at Auckland's Rose Theatre – Up the Garden Path and Girl Talk in 1993 and 1994, respectively.

Following her graduation from the Actor's Centre Australia, Chappell has performed as the titular character in Educating Rita, which toured Australia in 2007, before returning to New Zealand to appear in productions, such as, Design for Living, The Thirty-Nine Steps, The Importance of Being Earnest, The Vagina Monologues, The Wizard of Oz, and Much Ado About Nothing.

Chappell has, more recently, appeared in roles in contemporary works, including Fallen Angels, The Pink Hammer, That Bloody Woman, Bright Star, and Shortland Street – The Musical, and three plays which she wrote and produced – On/Off, Fred, and Bad Day Insurance.

She is a member of Equity New Zealand.

=== Singing ===
Chappell's debut album, When Then Is Now, was released on 1 May 2006. She did some minor touring in Australia and New Zealand to support the album's release.

== Personal life ==
Chappell met Chris Taylor in August 2001 when they both attended her McLeod's Daughters co-star, Rachael Carpani's 21st birthday; they married in December 2001, and divorced in 2005. She currently resides in Puhoi, New Zealand.

== Filmography ==
Film
Year	Title	Role	Notes	Ref.
1993	Desperate Remedies	Anne Cooper		
1995	Dirty Dave	Lucy	Short	
1996	Jack Brown Genius	Sylvia		
2007	Crossbow	Mum	Short	
2008	Beneath The Tides	Jane	Short	
2009	Coffin Rock	Jessie Willis		
2010	Be Careful...	Fi	Short	
2017	Out of the Shadows	Linda Dee		

Television
Year	Title	Role	Notes	Ref.
1987–90	Gloss	Chelsea Redfern	Main role: Seasons 1–3 — 55 episodes	
1990–91	Shark in the Park	Tanya	Recurring role: Seasons 2–3 — 13 episodes	
1992	Shortland Street	Deborah Walters	Guest role: Season 1, episodes 5 & 6	
1994	Hercules and the Circle of Fire	Daughter #1	TV film	
1995	Mysterious Island	Jane Morecombe	Guest role: Season 1, episode 16	
1995–99	Hercules: The Legendary Journeys	Various	Guest role: Seasons 1–5 — 7 episodes	
1996	Letter to Blanchy	Monica	Guest role: Season 2, episode 5	
1996–98	City Life	Bronwyn Kellett	Main role: Season 1 — 26 episodes	
1999	A Twist in the Tale	Aunt Linda	Guest role: Season 1, episode 11	
2001–03	McLeod's Daughters	Claire McLeod	Main role: Seasons 1–3 — 73 episodes (Note: Chappell appeared in 73 episodes of McLeod's Daughters over the first three seasons (2001–2003); however, she was credited for the Season 4 episode, "Fool for Love", although she did not appear.)	
2004	Stingers	Megan Walsh	Recurring role: Season 8 — 9 episodes	
2005	Intrepid Journeys	Herself	Episode: Season 3, episode 7 – "Malaysia"	
2006	Small Claims: The Reunion	Louise Page	TV film	
2009	The Cult	Sophie McIntyre	Main role: Season 1 — 13 episodes	
2010	Rescue: Special Ops	Vivian Walker	Guest role: Season 2, episode 9	
2010	Cops L.A.C.	Justine Taylor	Guest role: Season 1, episode 5	
2011	Emilie Richards – Der Zauber von Neuseeland	Daisy	TV film	
2012	True Crime: Siege	Robyn Diver	TV film	
2013	Agent Anna	Marina	Guest role: Season 1, episode 3	
2014	Auckland Daze	Lisa	Guest role: Season 2, episode 4	
2016	Jean	Mrs. Shepherd	TV film	
2016	Friday Night Bites	Mum	Guest role: Season 1, episode 7	
2016	Roman Empire	Faustina	Guest role: Season 1, episode 1	
2018	James Patterson's Murder is Forever	Dr. Claire Hunter	Guest role: Season 1, episode 4	
2018	Tongue Tied	Annie	Main role: Season 1 — 7 episodes	
2020–22	Shortland Street	Michelle Beaufort	Main role: Seasons 29–31 — 194 episodes	
2022	The Brokenwood Mysteries	Polly McAlpine	Guest role: Season 8, episode 5	
2023	Blind Bitter Happiness	Helen	TV series	
2024	My Life is Murder	Christine	Guest role: Season 4, episode 2	
2024	Camp Be Better	Sloan	Guest role: Season 1, episode 2	
2025	Zombies 4: Dawn of the Vampires	Eldress	TV film	
2025–26	Spartacus: House of Ashur	Horatia	Recurring role: Season 1 — 3 episodes	

== Theatre ==
- The Merchant of Venice (Rose Theatre, 1991)
- Chicago (Auckland Operatic, 1992)
- Up the Garden Path (Rose Theatre, 1993)
- Girl Talk (Rose Theatre, 1994)
- The Lover (The PumpHouse Theatre, 1995)
- All My Sons (Maidment Theatre, 1997)
- The Herbal Bed (Court Theatre, 1998)
- Hamlet (Actors Centre Australia, 2000)
- A.R. Gurney's Love Letters (2005)
- The Homecoming (Auckland Arts Festival, 2007)
- Educating Rita (toured in Australia, 2007)
- Design for Living (Maidment Theatre, 2008)
- The Thirty-Nine Steps (Maidment Theatre, 2009)
- Don't Hold Your Breath (Maidment Theatre, 2009)
- The Importance of Being Earnest (Maidment Theatre, 2010)
- The Vagina Monologues (Basement Theatre, 2010)
- Mike & Virginia (Herald Theatre, 2011)
- The Wizard of Oz (Peach Theatre Company, 2011)
- The Motor Camp (Maidment Theatre, 2012)
- Much Ado About Nothing (Court Theatre, 2012)
- Badjelly the Witch (Bruce Mason Centre, 2013)
- On/Off (Bordello Theatre, 2013)
- Fallen Angels (Q Theatre, 2014)
- Fred (The Basement Theatre, 2014)
- Bad Day Insurance (Old 505 Theatre, 2014)
- Detroit (Darlinghurst Theatre, 2015)
- Social Climbers (The PumpHouse Theatre, 2015)
- Polo (Sky City Theatre, 2016)
- The Pink Hammer (The PumpHouse Theatre, 2016)
- Menopause The Musical (2016)
- Peer Gynt (ASB Waterfront Theatre, 2017)
- Two (2017)
- That Bloody Woman (Centrepoint Theatre, 2018)
- Bright Star (Herald Theatre, 2018)
- Shortland Street – The Musical (ASB Waterfront Theatre, 2018)
- The Next Step (Warkworth Town Hall, 2019)
- Six Degrees of Separation (ASB Waterfront Theatre, 2019)
- Rosencrantz and Guildenstern Are Dead (ASB Waterfront Theatre, 2019)
- Di and Viv and Rose (The Pumphouse Theatre, 2022)

== Awards and nominations ==
Year	Association	Category	Nominated work	Result	Ref.
2002 (Note: The 44th Annual TV Week Logie Awards (2002) are nominations relating to Australian television in 2001 – Chappell was nominated for her performance in Season 1 of McLeod's Daughters.)	Logie Awards	Most Popular New Female Talent	McLeod's Daughters	Won	
2003 (Note: The 45th Annual TV Week Logie Awards (2003) are nominations relating to Australian television in 2002 – Chappell was nominated for her performance in Season 2 of McLeod's Daughters.)	Logie Awards	Most Popular Actress	McLeod's Daughters	Nominated	
2003	Logie Awards	Gold Logie Award for Most Popular Personality on Australian Television	McLeod's Daughters	Nominated	
2004 (Note: The 46th Annual TV Week Logie Awards (2004) are nominations relating to Australian television in 2003 – Chappell was nominated for her performance in Season 3 of McLeod's Daughters.)	Logie Awards	Most Popular Actress	McLeod's Daughters	Won	
2004	Logie Awards	Gold Logie Award for Most Popular Personality on Australian Television	McLeod's Daughters	Nominated	
2010	Qantas Film and Television Awards	Best Performance by a Supporting Actress – General Television	The Cult	Won	
