= List of reportedly haunted locations in New Zealand =

This is a list of reportedly haunted locations in New Zealand.

== North Island ==
=== Auckland ===
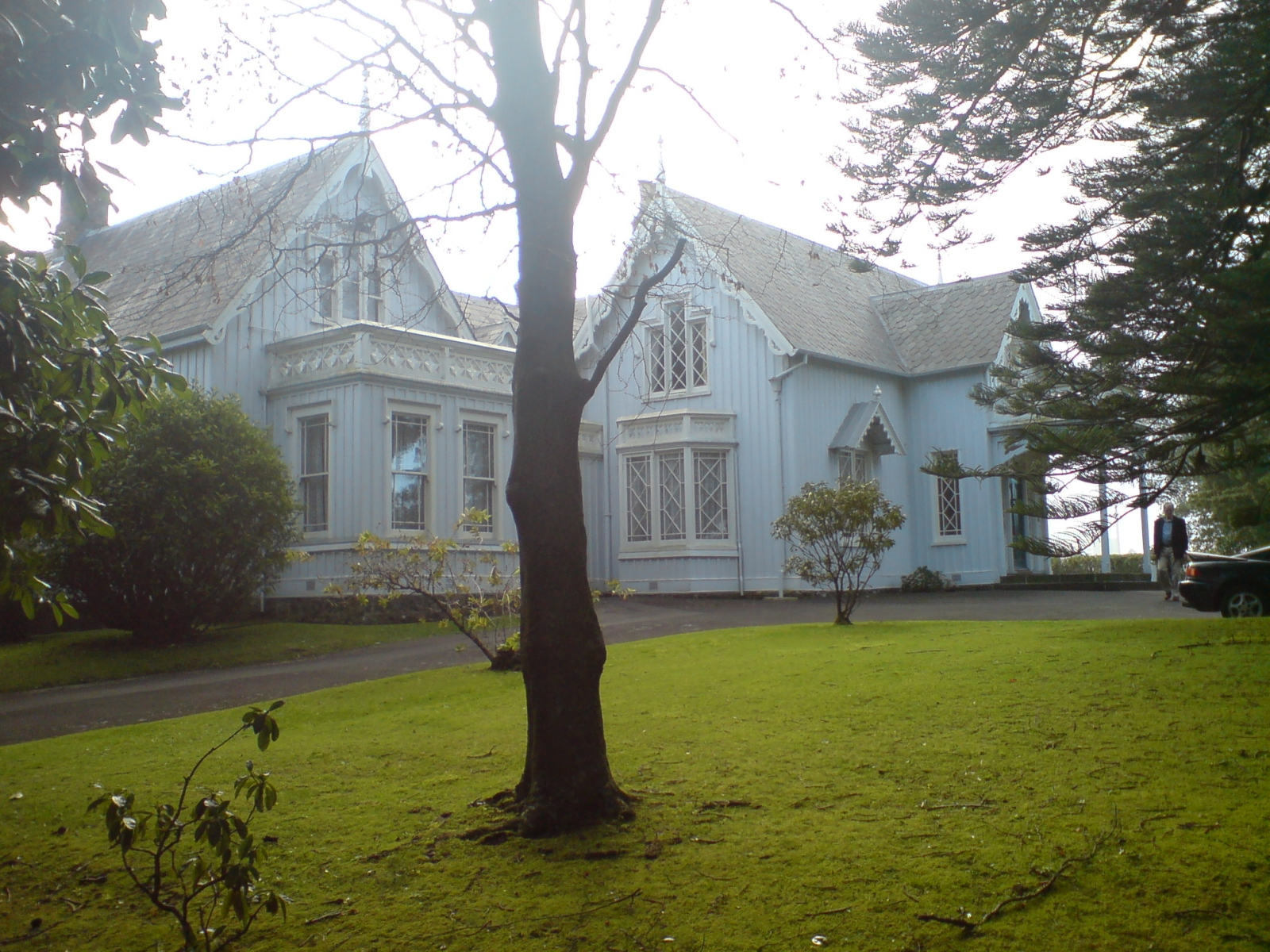
Highwic

Alberton, Auckland
The first floor of this historic Auckland house has been the site of multiple reported sightings of ghostly women dressed in Victorian clothes.

Ewelme Cottage, Auckland
There are claims that the cottage is haunted by spirits of women and children, notably a young girl who has reportedly appeared by an oak tree in the garden.

Highwic, Auckland
There have been claimed sightings of a ghost in a bedroom. It is also said to be the home to a ghostly canine. A spokeswoman claimed that a black dog has been seen running across the garden to the property's boundary.

The PumpHouse Theatre, Auckland
Many people have reporting a feeling of being watched, missing props (only to have them return a few minutes later) and the flash of someone watching from the Stage Right wings. The ghost is thought to be a former theatre stalwart, Margaret Escott

=== Wellington ===
St James Theatre, Wellington
There have been numerous unconfirmed reports of several ghosts in the St. James Theatre. The ghost most commonly referred to in these narratives is that of Yuri, a Russian performer who supposedly fell to his death from the flies several metres above the stage. Other spirits reputed to haunt the theatre include the "Wailing Woman", the ghost of an actress.

Archives New Zealand and Department of Internal Affairs buildings, Wellington

According to information provided in response to an Official Information Act request, staff working at the Archives New Zealand building on Mulgrave Street have discussed concerns about an "infamous" ghost in the basement, while staff working at the Department of Internal Affairs head office took photographic evidence of a "spectre" on level 13. The photo was not released as part of the information provided.

New Zealand Parliament, Wellington

Staff reported seeing spirits of previous occupants including MP William Larnach, who was found dead inside parliament with a gunshot wound, and the chamber's first full-time librarian Ewen McColl, whose death was partly attributed to overwork. Other accounts include hands reaching out from the stacks, singing from empty bathrooms, sightings of a ghostly woman in a mirror, and locked doors swinging open.

=== Elsewhere ===
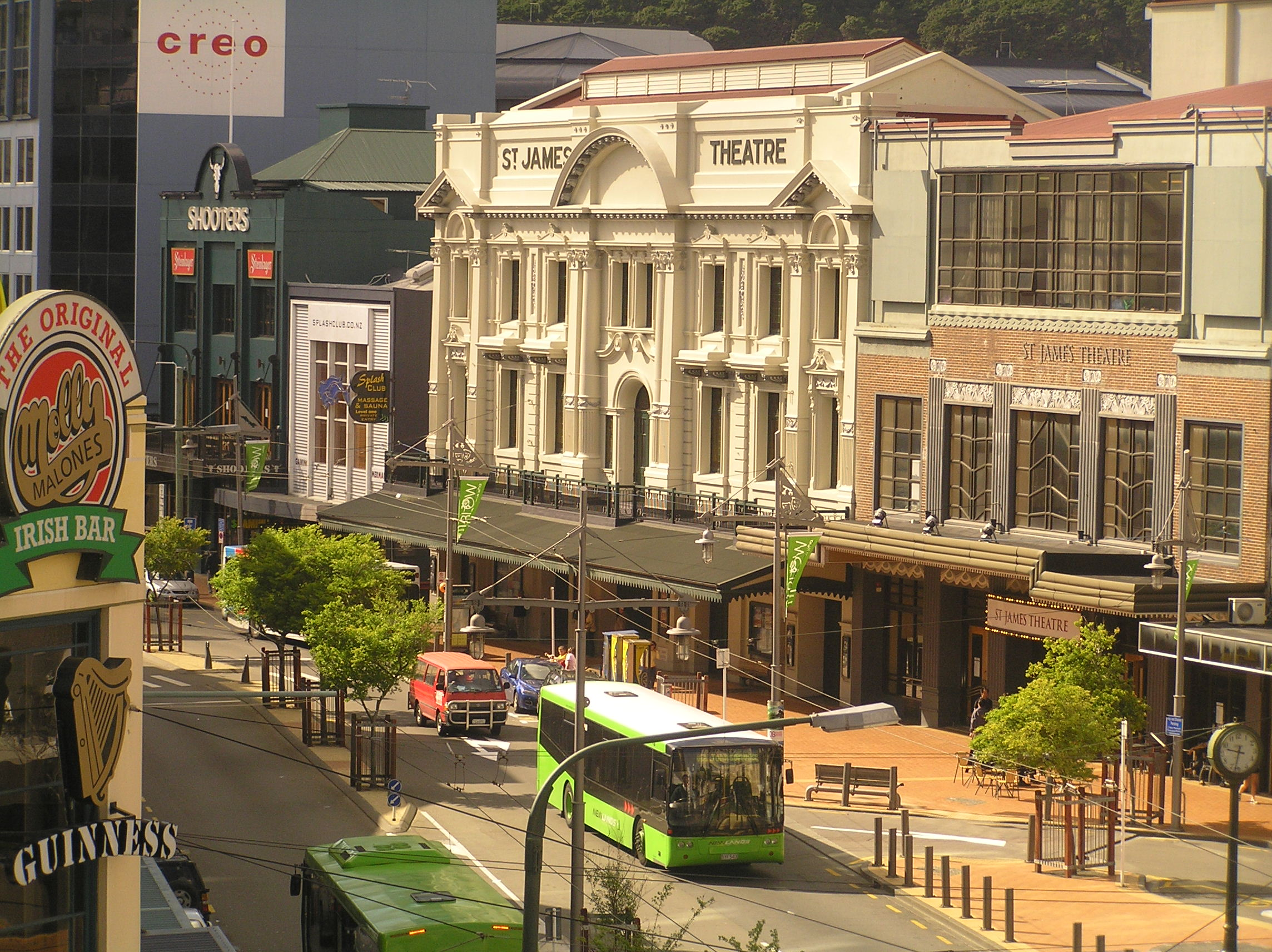
St James Theatre

Kingseat Hospital, Karaka
Over 100 apparitions have been seen at the former psychiatric hospital.

Napier Prison, Napier
People have reputedly heard footsteps and voices, and doors being opened or closed of their own volition. Many believe the spirit of former prisoner Roland Herbert Edwards, who was executed here, haunts the prison.

Piwhane / Spirits Bay, Northland
According to Māori tradition, the bay is the location where spirits of the dead gather to depart from this world to travel to their ancestral home (or afterlife).

Waitomo Caves Hotel, Waikato
The hotel is reputedly haunted by a Māori man, a woman in Victorian dress, and a young girl.

== South Island ==
=== Dunedin ===
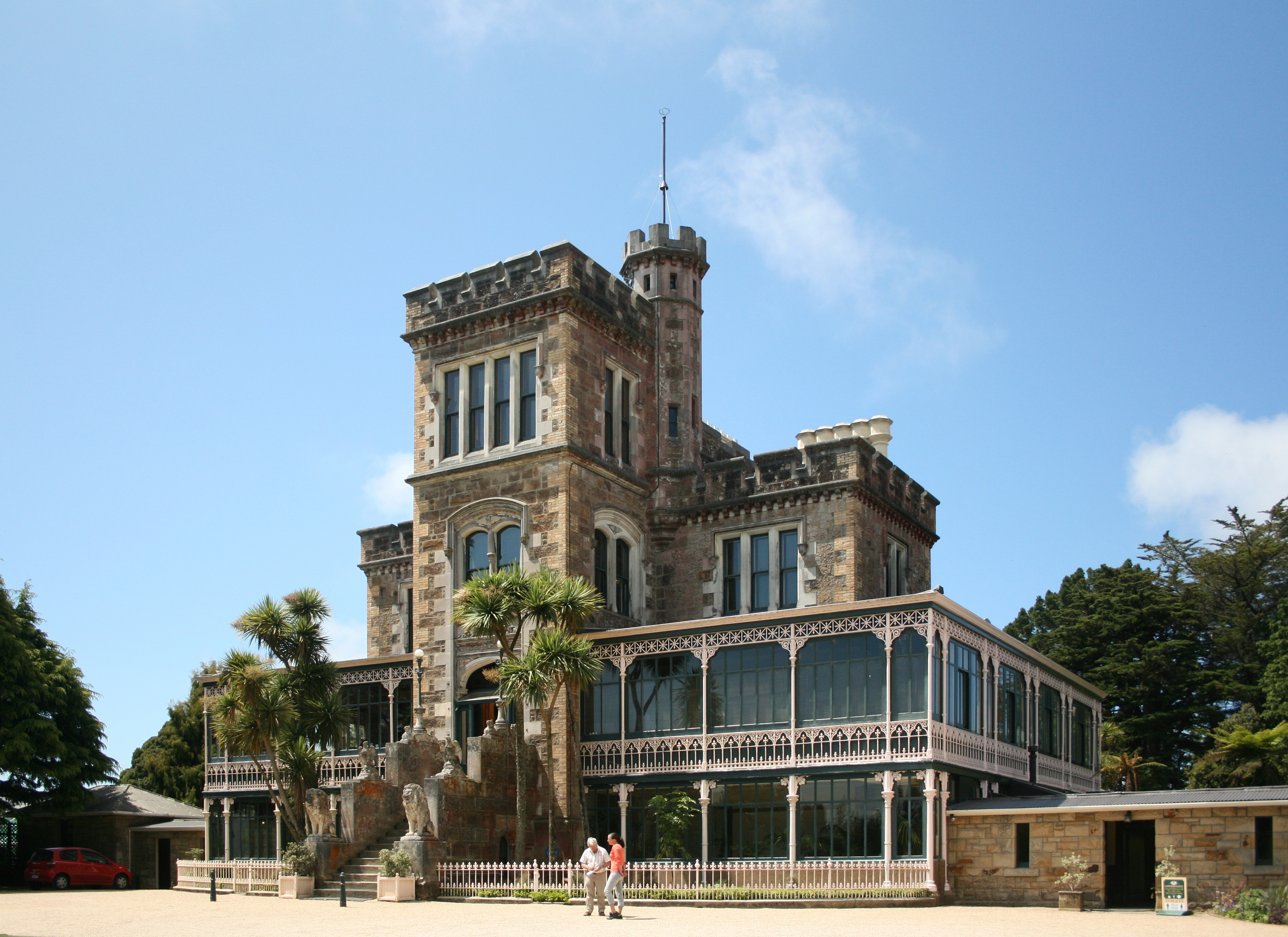
Larnach Castle

Cumberland College, Dunedin
The college is reputed to be haunted by a spirit known as "the Grey Lady", the apparition possibly dating from the college's time as a nurse's hostel.

Former Fortune Theatre, Dunedin
Not long after the Fortune Theatre moved into the old church, tales spread of "sinister voices" being heard offstage and well-secured lights falling from the lighting grid. A phantom audience member has also been reported by theatregoers on numerous occasions.

Larnach Castle, Dunedin
At least two ghosts, reputedly those of William Larnach and his daughter Eliza, are believed to haunt Larnach Castle.

Regent Theatre, Dunedin
Electrical appliances and taps have reportedly turned themselves on or off, and theatre patrons have claimed feeling someone or something kicking the underside of their seats. The theatre was built over the site of buildings destroyed in a major fatal fire in 1879.

=== Elsewhere ===
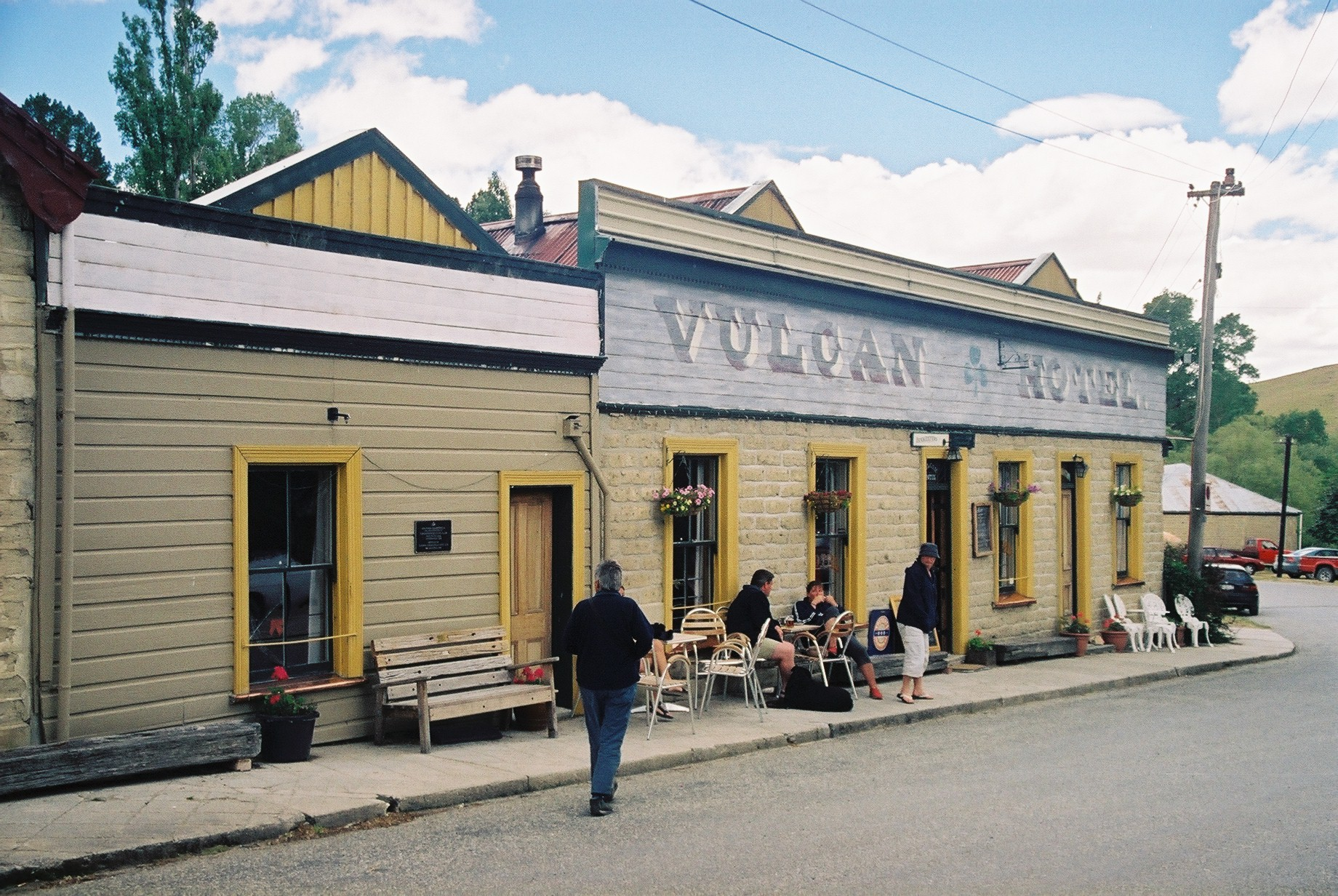
Vulcan Hotel

Riccarton Racecourse Hotel, Christchurch
The ghost of a former licensee reputedly walks the corridors of the hotel looking for his killer.

Seacliff Lunatic Asylum, Otago
The site of the former hospital is reputedly haunted by several former patients.

Vulcan Hotel, Saint Bathans
The hotel is notable as possibly the country's most famous haunted building. Room 1 of the hotel is reputedly home to the spirit of a young woman, thought by some to be a prostitute known as "the Rose", who was strangled to death in the hotel in the 1880s.

== See also ==
- Ghosts and spirits in Māori culture
- List of haunted locations
- Haunted Auckland / Paranormal New Zealand
