= Badjelly's Bad Christmas =

Musical

Badjelly's Bad Christmas was a musical created and performed by the Chickenshed Theatre Company, based on the works of Spike Milligan. It was directed by Mary Ward and Louise Perry, and the writer was Dave Carey.

The show follows the journey of two arguing sisters, Kate and Laura, who go to visit their Grandad for Christmas after they push their mother to the verge of mental breakdown. When they arrive at their Grandad's house they realise that he has a new girlfriend; his own wife died two years previously. His new girlfriend, who claims she is Barbara Jelly, is in fact the evil witch Badjelly.

The show was fully interpreted with British Sign Language by on stage signers, who were fully included in the action, and on some of the performances the show was captioned for the deaf and hard of hearing. It ran from 1 December 2010 until 15 January 2011.

== Synopsis ==
=== Prologue – The Children go on a Journey ===
The show starts with a mockery of the notice commonly seen at the beginning of films stating where it can be shown. It states "This production is licensed for theatre use only. The definition of theatre use excludes the use of this production in places such as schools, oil rigs, prisons, sweet shops, sweatshops..." it then goes on in this manner for a long time, the places getting more and more ridiculous each time, until at the end it gives a random address in the area. This announcement is followed by "I'm Walking Backwards for Christmas". The song is then interrupted by a loud smashing of glass, and the mother of the two main characters, Kate and Laura, tells them off for stopping the song. Kate offers her mother some tablets for the stress (which Kate, being 8, called Smarties). Her mother refuses them, saying that she doesn't need any tablets, and says she is sending them to Grandad's house. The children are very reluctant, as their Grandad is crazy and has an imaginary world in his head, called the Land of the Bumbly Boo, but they give in and leave for Grandad's house. This is then followed by "Walking Backwards for Christmas" again, this time not cut off, in which Kate and Laura travel by train to Grandad's house. During the train ride, two children and their mother (played by Dina Williams) are arguing. Kate and Laura then have an argument in which Kate states that if she had one wish, it would be to never ever have to see Laura ever again.

=== Act I ===
==== Scene I – And arrive at Grandad's House ====
The children arrive at Grandad's house, and are given a frosty reception by a woman called Barbara Jelly, who doesn't allow them into the house. Then they distract her, and go into the house. They find Grandad doing a jigsaw puzzle. This confuses them, as Grandad had never liked jigsaw puzzles, much preferring to skateboard in the garden. They learn that Barbara Jelly and Grandad are boyfriend and girlfriend. The couple met on holiday in Scarborough. Laura then asked how long they'd been together, to which Grandad replies "Oh, well, it's early days". This is followed by the song "It's Early Days", in which Grandad proclaims his love for Barbara Jelly, while Barbara Jelly tries to maim him, and on one occasion, Kate, which she disguises as dancing. At the end of the song they attempt to kiss, but they're interrupted by Kate asking if Grandad will show her his magic baubles. The "magic baubles" are 5 baubles which each hold a figurine of one of the characters in Grandad's imaginary world.

Grandad goes through all the baubles in turn, explaining what each one represents. The baubles are:

- Honour, which holds a figurine of Sir Nobonk
- Laughter, which holds a figurine of King Twytt
- Wisdom/wit, which holds a figurine of The Werkling
- Courage, which holds a figurine of the Conkerer

Laura, who is passing the baubles to Grandad, says that the fifth one is broken. Grandad initially refuses to believe her, until she pours the smashed remains of the outer shell of the bauble onto the floor.

The fifth bauble represents evil, and should hold a figure of Badjelly. However the figure is missing, and Grandad says this means Badjelly is somewhere around them. Grandad realises that Barbara Jelly appeared on the very same day he brought his baubles on the coach to Scarborough, and "Barbara Jelly" confirms that she is in fact, Badjelly the Witch. She hints that she plans to turn The Land of the Bumbly Boo evil, before she promptly escaped to the Land of the Bumbly Boo, Grandad's "imaginary" world, taking the baubles with her.

==== Scene 2 – The Adventure Begins ====
Grandad reveals that The Land of the Bumbly Boo is in fact, real, and it is based on the five baubles that he owns. If all the baubles are united on a Christmas tree, the owner of the baubles can make a wish. He thinks that Badjelly has stolen the baubles, which she will put on her Christmas tree and as she said, turn the Land of the Bumbly Boo evil. He says they have to follow her and get the baubles back. The only way to travel to the Land of the Bumbly Boo is by "B.E.D.S.I.R.", which stands for Best Ever Driving Scheme Invented Recently. He then reveals that the B.E.D.S.I.R. is in fact, what they thought was a broken chairman in his living room. Laura then asks if the B.E.D.S.I.R. has a key, which it doesn't. It is what Grandad calls a "push start" B.E.D.S.I.R., essentially meaning they have to push it. They then push the B.E.D.S.I.R. ten and a half feet across the lounge, before Grandad says they're in the Land of the Bumbly Boo, which confuses Laura and Kate because they don't appear to have moved very far at all.

Suddenly there is a blackout, and they find themselves surrounded by a tribe of Bumbly Boos – creatures dressed in red, white and blue, with glowing hands, and blue war-paint on their faces. The Bumbly Boos attempt to kill Grandad, Kate, and Laura using their spears ("In the Land of the Bumbly Boo"), until their leader, Sir Nobonk, recognises Grandad from his last visit.

Kate explains Grandad's situation to Sir Nobonk, and after commenting on Grandad's bad choice in girlfriends, Sir Nobonk says they need King Twytt to help them.

King Twytt arrives on a tricycle, along with his Twytts, Queen Twytt and Mayor Naise ("He's the Twytt of the Highest Order"). King Twytt and his Twytts are trying to make Queen Twytt laugh, because she doesn't find anything funny any more. After several unsuccessful attempts, they give up, and Grandad and Sir Nobonk tell King Twytt about the situation they're in. King Twytt reacts by laughing hysterically, then realising they are in a very sticky situation. He says they need someone cleverer than him to sort it out, and they go off in search of The Werkling.

==== Scene 3 – Meanwhile on the other side of town ====
Badjelly's sisters, Wobble and Ice Cream arrive back to the Land of the Bumbly Boo after a day of pretending to be a nurse and a nun respectively, before Badjelly arrives cheerfully. telling them that she's hatched an evil plan. She tells them about it, and they then excitedly put the baubles on their Christmas tree, but nothing happens. They realised that as they stole the baubles, they are not the rightful owners. Kate was the last owner of the baubles, as she handed them to Badjelly. They plan to kidnap Kate and turn her into one of them so she will wish for the Land of the Bumbly Boo to become evil.

==== Scene 4 – They come to the place where the Cows go Bong ====
Grandad, Kate, Laura, Sir Nobonk and King Twytt arrive at The Werkling's Factory (aka The Ning Nang Nong), which has many Werkers, creatures which are part machine. The audience learns about the factory in the song "On the Ning Nang Nong", and then meets the Werkling. King Twytt and Sir Nobonk tell the Werkling what's happened, and the Werkling claims that he knows it all already.

After much thought and telling a long story in nonsense about Badjelly, he concludes that they must "follow the string". They find a long red string running out of the Ning Nang Nong, which they follow. They arrive in a field, where Badjelly, Wobble and Ice Cream are waiting for them. It turns out the string was actually a trap, set up by Badjelly to lure Kate.

==== Scene 5 – And as the sun rises a great duel takes place... ====
They decide they have to have a duel, Sir Nobonk versus Badjelly. In the end there is no clear winner, but Wobble, Ice Cream and Badjelly succeed in kidnapping Kate.

=== Act II ===
==== Starts with a goodnight to all ====
A man comes on the voice-over saying "Due to circumstances beyond our control, the second half will begin shortly." Sir Nobonk accidentally thinks it's the end of the show, and says goodbye to the audience and gives them instructions for what to do as they leave (flirting with several of them as he does so) in the song "The Party's Over". The signers come on and tell Sir Nobonk to apologise to the audience for the confusion. He does this, and ends his song with the words "Hello, hello, hello, hello!"

==== Scene 1 – The Adventure Continues ====
Grandad says they have to go to the court of the Itchy Koo. Laura gets worried, because she doesn't want to have to walk there. Grandad agrees to get a taxi, which turns out to be a wheelbarrow. The taxi driver then makes an excuse to leave, and "drives" away.

==== Scene 2 – On the other side of town ====
Badjelly, Ice Cream and Wobble have kidnapped Kate, but they all, especially Ice Cream, find Kate's long rambling stories and advice very boring. Kate also doesn't want to become evil, so they tell her about their childhood in the song "The Beauty of our Childhood" in the hope it'll make her want to become evil with them. Their plan succeeds, and Kate turns evil.

==== Scene 3 – On the way ====
The judge arrives at the court of the Itchy Koo, and tells us about Noses in "The Nose Song".

==== Scene 4 – They arrive ====
Grandad, Laura, Sir Nobonk, King Twytt, and The Werkling arrive at the Court of the Itchy Koo, and the Itchy Koos arrive, singing "I wish I were in Itchy Koo land", and decorate the courtroom in brightly coloured ribbons. Coincidentally, soon after their arrival, Badjelly, Wobble, Ice Cream and Kate arrive.

==== Scene 5 – And find themselves in court ====
The Itchy Kooks decide they need to have a court session to sort it out. Everyone in The Land of the Bumbly Boo turns out to be a juror. The Judge hears both sides of the story, and discovers that Kate is the rightful owner of the baubles. He asks Kate what she wants to with the baubles, to which she replies that she wants to crush honour, laughter, bravery, and wit in her hand. Laura tries to tell the judge that she's been turned evil, but the Judge tells her if it's what Kate wants to wish, so be it. Grandad claims that Badjelly tried to kill Sir Nobonk in the duel, so the judge says they should have a joust to settle the argument. This is met by cheering from the jurors, but then the Conkerer decides that they will have a hip hopera, a rap battle of nonsense. Whoever raps the best nonsense wins. This commences "The Itchy Koo Hip Hopera".

First it is King Twytt's go, and he raps a story about jam. Then Wobble and Ice Cream do their rap using only nonsense words. Badjelly raps a story about eels, and then Sir Nobonk raps a story about a doctor. Then Wobble, Ice Cream and Badjelly sing a story about a "Wiggle-Woggle", who has a stomach ache. This knocks out Sir Nobonk, King Twytt and The Werkling, and Wobble, Ice Cream and Badjelly are convinced they've won. However, slowly King Twytt comes round and gives the microphone to The Werkling, who is terrified as he has never performed a nonsense rap in his life. However, it turns out he is in fact incredibly good at nonsense, and he wins the hip hopera. However, Badjelly, Wobble and Ice Cream refuse to accept the decision, and storm off with Kate, yelling that they'll get their way.

==== Scene 6 – Something has to be done but who will do it ====
Grandad says that he's now half the man he was without Grandma, in the song "I'm half the man". He finds Kate sleeping, and walks into her dream, which is about Grandma. Grandma continues the song "I'm half the man", and tells him that he needs to pull himself together, to stop wallowing in self-pity, and that he should stop "shedding lonely tears". He walks out of the dream, and hears Grandma's voice telling him that he doesn't need baubles to be funny, brave or kind, and to show Kate that he loves her to stop her being evil, because love conquers all.

==== Scene 7 – Time to go home ====
Badjelly interrupts, telling Kate to make her wish quickly. Kate is about to make the wish, when Grandad tells her in nonsense how much he loves her. Kate then stops being evil, and runs up and hugs Grandad. Then Laura, King Twytt, Queen Twytt, The Werkling, the Conkerer and Sir Nobonk arrive to see the happy scene unfolding. Enraged by the failure of her evil plan, Badjelly shouts "Smelly poo to all of you", which everyone, including Queen Twytt, finds hilarious. King Twytt realised that Badjelly has just made Queen Twytt laugh, and tells her that she is actually quite funny. Badjelly gets very annoyed because no one is scared of her. Sir Nobonk reveals that he is actually very attracted to her. She then makes the joke "Have you ever been to Scarborough?" (as Scarborough was where she and Grandad met), which causes the judge to say that someone has to be punished because the joke was awful. He asks the Conkerer to come forward to be punished, but he protests, saying that he didn't make the joke. The Judge insists on punishing him, based on the fact that he was there when the joke was made. He then asks for the "Royal Jelly", and on comes Mayor Naise, holding a red jelly with whipped cream on top. The Conkerer is then "jellied" in the face, but Badjelly says that that was just plain cruel. Sir Nobonk, while handing The Conkerer a towel, says it's just a bit of fun, and Badjelly realises that she can be funny instead of mean. She makes friends with Queen Twytt, and they leave to go shopping.

Suddenly, the train from the Land of the Bumbly Boo to reality comes, and Grandad, Kate and Laura go home. When they arrive home, they realise that Kate still has a wish left. Laura expects Kate to wish to never have to see her again, as she said on the journey to Grandad's house. However, Kate decides to save her wish for when she needs it. Their Mum calls and tells them it's time to go home, but says that they can come over again after Christmas.

=== The Epilogue ===
Laura, Kate and Grandad are sitting in Grandad's lounge, with the baubles, when suddenly the door opens, and in come several pairs of creatures from the Land of the Bumbly Boo, and they dance to the song "There is a song in man". Halfway through the song, the Conkerer, Sir Nobonk, Badjelly, King Twytt, Queen Twytt, Wobble and Ice Cream also enter. They are soon followed by more creatures from the Land of the Bumbly Boo, (the rest of the cast), and by the end of the song, the whole cast are on stage.

For the final bows, the casts sing "The Ying Tong Song", and do their bows in character, before character group by group, they leave, leaving Grandad, Kate and Laura on stage. Grandad then wishes the audience a Merry Christmas (and on the performances nearing New Year's Eve, a Happy New Year), before exiting with Kate and Laura. To end the show, an image of Spike Milligan is projected on to a piece of set.

== Principal roles and notable performers ==
Character	Description	Blue Cast	Green Cast	Red Cast	Yellow Cast	Understudy	Additional details
Grandad	The grandfather of Kate and Laura	Joseph Morton	Joseph Morton	Joseph Morton	Joseph Morton	Paul Harris	Grandad's wife died two years before the story begins
Laura	A 15-year-old girl, sister of Kate	Sade Morrall	Milly Rolle	Kelly-Anne Taylor	Molly Coulson-Chard	N/A	N/A
Kate	8-year-old girl with a love of nonsense	Annabel Vasey	Natalia Andronikou	Lucy-Mae Beacock	Grace Coulson-Harris	N/A	Kate's costume included a pair of red shoes, because Spike Milligan bought his daughter, Jane, who performed as Grandma, a pair of red shoes that he remained attached to even after Jane ceased to wear them.
Badjelly	A witch	Charlotte Bull	Charlotte Bull	Charlotte Bull	Charlotte Bull	Sarah Connolly	N/A
Wobble	A witch, sister of Badjelly	Jelena Budimir	Jelena Budimir	Jelena Budimir	Jelena Budimir	Emily Arnold	N/A
Ice Cream	Another Witch, also a sister of Badjelly	Belinda McGuirk	Belinda McGuirk	Belinda McGuirk	Belinda McGuirk	Paige Stubley	N/A
King Twytt	The King of the Twytts	Gavin May	Gavin May	Gavin May	Gavin May	Marc Picard	N/A
Sir Nobonk	A crazy knight, who knights people for no apparent reason	Mark Lees	Mark Lees	Mark Lees	Mark Lees	Will Laurence	N/A
Queen Twytt	The Queen of the Twytts	Emma Cambridge	Emma Cambridge	Emma Cambridge	Emma Cambridge	Alice Sidell-Hodgson	N/A
The Werkling	The head werker in the Ning Nang Nong	Robin Shillinglaw	Robin Shillinglaw	Robin Shillinglaw	Robin Shillinglaw	Erol Mustafa	N/A
The Bongaloo	The Werker's aide	Loren Jacobs	Loren Jacobs	Loren Jacobs	Loren Jacobs	N/A	N/A
The Judge	A Judge	Nigel Spurgeon	Nigel Spurgeon	Nigel Spurgeon	Nigel Spurgeon	James Dulay-Jefferson	N/A
Grandma	The wife of Grandad	Jane Milligan	Jane Milligan	Jane Milligan	Jane Milligan	N/A	Jane Milligan is the daughter of Spike Milligan, the work of whom this play was based around
The Signers	The Signers of the Show	JoJo Morrall, Stephanie Dye, Anthony Pickersgill	JoJo Morrall, Stephanie Dye, Anthony Pickersgill	JoJo Morrall, Stephanie Dye, Anthony Pickersgill	JoJo Morrall, Stephanie Dye, Anthony Pickersgill	N/A	Many critics commended Chickenshed on their inclusion of the signers, and the signers for their energy and enthusiasm.

== Musical numbers ==
=== Act I ===
- "I'm Walking Backward's for Christmas" – The Cast
- "It's Early Days" – Grandad and Barbara Jelly
- "In the Land of the Bumbly Boo" – The Bumbly Boos and Sir Nobonk
- "He's a Twytt of the Highest Order" – King Twytt, Queen Twytt, Mayor Naise and the Twytts
- "In the Ning Nang Nong" – The Werkling, The Bongaloo and the Werkers

=== Act II ===
- "The Party's Over" – Sir Nobonk
- "The Beauty of Our Childhood" – Badjelly, Ice Cream, Wobble
- "The Nose Song" – The Judge
- "I wish I was in Itchy Koo Land" – The Itchy Koos and the Conkerer
- "The Itchy Koo Hip Hopera" – The Cast
- "I'm half the man I was" – Grandad and Grandma

=== Epilogue ===
- "There is a Song in Man" – The Cast
- "The Ying Tong Song" – The Cast

== Inclusivity ==
The Chickenshed Theatre Company was the first company to introduce the idea of inclusive theatre in both performing and watching.

=== Watching ===
Every performance of Badjelly's Bad Christmas had sign language fully integrated. On some nights it was captioned for the deaf, and audio described for the blind. The theatre was, and still is, wheelchair accessible.

=== Performing ===
The Chickenshed Theatre Company didn't hold auditions for any of the roles, but all the performers were members of the company.

== Critical response ==
Overall, Badjelly's Bad Christmas received very good reviews, and all the critics seemed to agree that it was a very good show, if a little crazy. The Stage magazine said "The nonsense of Spike Milligan meets the madness of Chickenshed and the results are suitably deranged". They went on to say "Dave Carey has achieved the playwright's equivalent of nailing jelly to a wall", and as for the signers, they said "it's all duplicated just to the side of the main action as three brilliant young performers not just sign but enact the entire piece in a virtual mini play within a play." However, they also said "A little more fire in its bad belly in the first half and a little less from the band – in danger of drowning out those hilarious lyrics – and I'm sure Milligan will be dancing and blowing raspberries from the wings." A Younger Theatre said "It's a little off-the-wall, but absolutely a joy and delight to watch." and commented on the energy of the cast, "It's fun, it's bursting with imagination, and the cast gives more energy in one single show than half of the shows I saw last year put together", the staging "Where Badjelly really excels is the continual revealing of new devices, characters, and methods of presenting the story to the audience", and the signers "The on-stage signing ... was excellently presented to be part of the action". They also commented on the attitude of the performers and staff "It's not often that a venue affects me as much as a show, but you can tell that rooted at the heart of Badjelly's Bad Christmas is the support, determination and love from the staff and the young people involved." This was generally considered one of the best reviews the show got.

=== Public response ===
There was a fantastic audience response to Badjelly's Bad Christmas, so much so many of the nights were sold out before the run of the show began, and even on a day when all the roads in the area were iced over, making it dangerous to drive, both performances (the matinee and evening performance) received reasonably large audiences.

One blogger said " The rap battle scene has the audience in fits of laughter and the directing of Louise Perry and Mary Ward should be congratulated, as the stage is buzzing with energy." She too commented on the signers, saying "They dance, act and sign the show for any audience members who may be deaf or hard of hearing. They are in fact so outstanding there comes a point when you realise, rather than watching the characters, you are instead watching them, especially as it is not every day you see rapping being translated to sign language."

== Rotas ==
In 1994 Chickenshed came up with the concept of having rotas and a fixed cast. All performers who are either a youth theatre, children's theatre or lunar theatre member are put on a rota, either Red, Yellow, Blue or Green, and the performances are shared out equally between all the rotas. Green rota has no performances during the annual Christmas holidays. All students at Chickenshed are put on more than one rota. The fixed cast is made up of adults who perform with Chickenshed for a living, usually referred to as the professional company. The fixed cast do all the performances. The understudies are usually students, who are put on rotas as usual, except of course if they are needed as an understudy they are expected to turn up regardless of whether or not their rota performs on that day. There were originally three rotas, along with a fixed cast. The same system is used today, except with four rotas.

== Spike Milligan references ==
In the play there were many references to Spike Milligan and his work.

=== Act I ===
- In the book Silly Verse for Kids, a girl called Laura was mentioned
- In the book Startling Verse for all the Family, a girl called Kate was mentioned
- Kate's costume included a pair of red shoes, because Spike Milligan bought his daughter, Jane, who performed as Grandma, a pair of red shoes that he remained attached to even after Jane ceased to wear them.
- The song "I'm Walking Backwards for Christmas" was originally composed and sung by the cast of The Goon Show.
- On the train journey, Kate was shown holding the book A Children's Treasury of Milligan, and read the poem "On the Ning Nang Nong" to her older sister, Laura. She then read the poem "My sister Laura", and when she got to Grandad's house, she read him an excerpt from the poem "Nothing Poem".
- Badjelly the Witch is the main character in the book written by Spike Milligan, Badjelly the Witch: A Fairy Story.
- The Land of the Bumbly Boo appears in a poem by Spike Milligan, also named "The Land of the Bumbly Boo". It was included in Silly Verse for Kids.
- The song "The Land of the Bumbly Boo" also shares its lyrics with the poem.
- Sir Nobonk was the main character in the book "Sir Nobonk and the Terrible Dreadful Awful Naughty Nasty Dragon", written by Spike Milligan
- The chorus of "He's the Twytt of the Highest Order" shares its lyrics with the poem "The Twit".
- King Twytt appeared with the name King Big – Twytt in the story "Sir Nobonk and the Terrible Dreadful Awful Naughty Nasty Dragon".
- The Werkling appeared in the poem titled "Werkling", in Startling Verse for all the Family
- The song "On The Ning Nang Nong" shared its lyrics with one of Spike Milligan's most famous poems with the same name. It was in Silly Verse for Kids.
- The fact that the Werkling scene was fairly sinister may have shown that, as The Stage magazine said, "All was not sweetness and light in Milligan's world."
- The Werkling's line "String is a very important thing. Rope is thicker but string is quicker" is taken from the poem "String", in "Silly Verse for Kids"
- The duel scene was taken from the book Sir Nobonk and the Terrible Dreadful Awful Naughty Nasty Dragon.

=== Act II ===
- "The Nose Song" shares most of its lyrics with the poem "Gertrude Conk", from the book Unspun Socks from a Chicken's Laundry
- "I wish I were in Itchy Koo land" shared its lyrics with the poem "Itchy Koo Land" in the book Unspun Socks from a Chicken's Laundry
- The Conkerer appeared in the poem "Conkerer" in the book Unspun Socks from a Chicken's Laundry
- All the raps in the hip hopera were in fact Spike Milligan's poems.
- Grandad's period of depression may have reflected Spike's struggle with mental illness.
- The use of slapstick comedy when the Conkerer was jellied was similar to the type of comedy on The Goon Show
- The chorus to "There is a Song in Man" were taken from the quote "Child Songs" by Spike Milligan
- The Ying Tong Song was originally performed on the Goon Show
