= Ayisha Davies =

Australian film producer

Ayisha Davies is an Australian film producer, known for the films The Bloody Sweet Hit (2007) and Coffin Rock (2009).

== Personal life ==
On 12 July 2017, Davies married Australian actor Robert Taylor. Together, they have a daughter named Scarlet.

== Career ==
Davies began her career in 1999 as a production secretary for two episodes of Australian television series Halifax f.p., including A Murder of Crows and Someone You Know. She then went on to become a literary manager, representing creatives within the Australian film industry, including David Lightfoot and the filmmakers of Saw.

Davies' husband Robert Taylor introduced her to Lightfoot in 2007, as he had worked with him previously in the 2005 film Wolf Creek. This introduction saw Davies begin working alongside Lightfoot at Ultra Films. Davies' first role alongside Lightfoot was as his assistant and 2nd production manager on the film Rogue (2007).

In 2007, Davies also became the production manager and producer of Damian Walshe-Howling's short film The Bloody Sweet Hit. Her career as a producer began to take off, as her film was selected to play at numerous film festivals including the St Kilda International Film Festival, Miami Film Festival, Shorts Film Festival, London's Rushes Soho Shorts Film Festival, Flickerfest, Movie Extra. It was sold to MTV Italy.

Davies was then appointed as a producer for the film Coffin Rock (2009), co-produced short film Press (2010), and worked as a production manager on the film John Doe: Vigilante (2014). In 2014, Davies produced two films – What Lola Wants, starring husband Robert Taylor, and Skylab, a sci-fi thriller.

== Filmography ==
=== Film ===
Year	Title	Role	Type
2007	The Bloody Sweet Hit	Production manager / producer	Short film
2007	Rogue	Assistant to David Lightfoot / 2nd production manager	Feature film
2009	Coffin Rock	Producer / post production supervisor	Feature film
2010	Press	Co-producer	Short film
2014	John Doe: Vigilante	Production manager	Feature film
2015	What Lola Wants	Producer	Feature film
TBA	Skylab	Producer	Yet to be released

=== Television ===
Year	Title	Role	Episode
1999	Halifax f.p.	Production secretary	Episode 13: "Someone You Know"
1999	Halifax f.p.	Production secretary	Episode 14: "A Murder of Crows"
