= Jack Brown Genius =

- DVD cover
- Directed by: Tony Hiles
- Written by: Tony Hiles; Peter Jackson; Frances Walsh
- Produced by: Peter Jackson; Jim Booth
- Starring: Timothy Balme; Lisa Chappell; Nicola Murphy; Marton Csokas; Stuart Devenie; Edward Campbell
- Cinematography: Allen Guilford
- Edited by: Jamie Selkirk
- Music by: Michelle Scullion
- Distributed by: Senator Film; Lionsgate Home Entertainment
- Release date: 11 July 1996
- Running time: 85 minutes
- Country: New Zealand
- Language: English

Jack Brown Genius is a 1996 New Zealand romantic comedy fantasy film directed by Tony Hiles, produced by Peter Jackson and written by both with Jackson's partner Fran Walsh. Actor Tim Balme, who had earlier starred in Jackson's movie Braindead, plays the title role.

== Synopsis ==
The brain of inventor Jack Brown is possessed by the soul of a medieval monk who thinks he knows the secret of how to fly.

== Awards ==
The film won three awards at the 1996 New Zealand Film and Television Awards:

- Best Actor (Tim Balme)
- Best Director (Tony Hiles)
- Best Film Score (Michelle Scullion)
