= Sam Parsonson =

Australian actor (born 1989)

- Born: 1989 (age 36–37)
- Occupation: Actor

Sam Parsonson (born 1989) is an Australian actor. He made his television debut at the age of 15 in the critically acclaimed Australian drama series Love My Way for two seasons. His performance in the role of Dylan earned him a nomination for a Logie Award for Most Outstanding Young Talent in 2007. He went on to appear in the channel 7 drama 'Headland'. His other television credits include All Saints and children's television series Double Trouble.

Sam has also accrued a list of theatre credits from a young age, including Summer Rain, Shakespeare Unleashed and Duologue from Titus and Andronicus for the Shakespeare Festival.

In 2008, Sam completed filming Steven Spielberg's US mini-series The Pacific. The 10-part tells the intertwined stories of three Marines during America's battle with the Japanese in the Pacific during World War II.

Sam also stars in the Australian 2009 horror/thriller film Coffin Rock, starring as Evan, alongside actors such as Lisa Chappell and Robert Taylor.

== Filmography ==
- Beast of War (2025) as Thompson
- Fear Below (2025) as Frank Sturgess
- Take My Hand (2024) as Alistair
- The Execution (2023) as Danny
- Transfusion (2023) as Ned
- Streamline (2021) as Nick Bush
- Sweet River (2020) as Troy
- At the Sign of Connie & Charlie's (2020) as Hotelier
- Danger Close: The Battle of Long Tan (2019) as Second Lieutenant David Sabben
- Birdie (2018)
- Outlaws (2017) as Noisy
- 1% (2017) as Knuckle
- Hacksaw Ridge (2016) as 96th Soldier Bob
- Crumble (2015) as Coilean
- John Doe: Vigilante (2014) as Murray Wills
- The Thing About Dolphins (2011) as Brodie the Barista
- Coffin Rock (2009) as Evan
- Deadline 8:45 (2006) as Oates

== Television ==
- The Narrow Road to the Deep North (2025) Mini Series as Rooster MacNeice
- Home and Away (2025) as Roscoe Mulhern
- Irreverent (2022) as James Jovic
- Bali 2002 (2022) Mini Series as David Royds
- Total Control (2021) as Constable Hewitt
- Operation Buffalo (2020) Mini series as Hill
- Les Norton (2019) Mini Series as Reg
- Romper Stomper (2018) TV Mini Series as Noddy
- Cleverman (2016) as Taki
- Gallipoli (2015) as Dave Klein
- Rake (2014) TV Series as Connor Fitzgibbons
- Bikie Wars: Brothers in Arms (2012) Mini Series as Junior
- Terra Nova (2011) TV series as Hunter
- The Pacific (2010) TV Mini Series as Pvt. William LaPointe
- My Place (2010) TV series as Jeff
- Double Trouble (2008) as Max
- Love My Way (2006–2007) as Dylan Feingold
- All Saints (2006) as Luke Harrison
- Headland (2006) as Nathan
