= Amateur film =

Genre of low-budget film by non-professionals

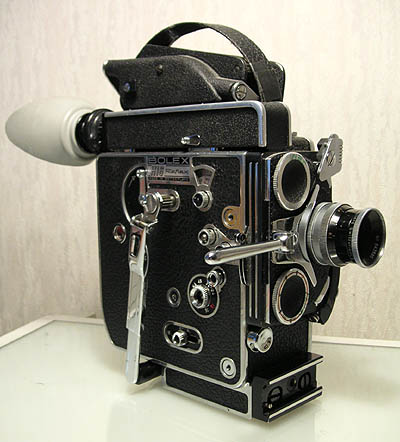
The Bolex H16, a popular camera among amateur filmmakers

Amateur film is a genre of filmmaking done primarily for personal enjoyment, passion, or hobby, without commercial intent or substantial funding. It encompasses a wide range of activities, from recording family events and local news to creating experimental works or dramatic productions.

It has overlap with fan films, a filmmaking genre used for amateur films created by fans rather than by the source's copyright holders or creators.

== Organizations ==
The international organization for amateur film makers is UNICA (Union International du Cinema Non Professionel); in the United States the American Motion Picture Society (AMPS), in Canada the Society of Canadian Cine Amateurs (SCCA), in the UK it is the Institute of Amateur Cinematographers. These organizations arrange annual festivals and conventions. There are several amateur film festivals held annually in the United States, Canada and Europe.

== Creation ==
Amateur films were usually shot on 16 mm film or on 8 mm film (either Double-8 or Super-8) until the advent of cheap video cameras or digital equipment. The advent of digital video and computer based editing programs greatly expanded the technical quality achievable by the amateur and low-budget filmmaker. Amateur video has become the choice for the low-budget filmmaker and has boomed into a very watched and even produced industry with the use of VHS and digital video camcorders.

== Notable films ==
=== National Film Registry ===
A number of amateur films have been added to the National Film Preservation Board's (NFPB) National Film Registry (NFR) including:

- The Augustas (1930s-1950s)
- Tacoma Narrows Bridge Collapse (1940)
- Disneyland Dream (1956)
- Zapruder film (1963)

=== Later works ===
- Firelight (Steven Spielberg—1964)
- The Valley (Peter Jackson—1976)
- Bad Taste (Peter Jackson—1987)
- It's Impossible to Learn to Plow by Reading Books (Richard Linklater—1988)

== Publications ==
- Ian Craven (ed.) Movies on Home Ground: Explorations in Amateur Cinema. Cambridge: Cambridge Scholars Publishing.
- Francis Dyson (2012) Challenging assumptions about amateur film of the inter-war years: Ace movies and the first generation of London based cine-clubs. Unpublished PhD thesis, Norwich: University of East Anglia
- Karen L. Ishizuka and Patricia Zimmerman (eds.) (2008) Mining the Home Movies: Excavations in Histories and Memories. Berkeley: University of California Press.
- Heather Norris Nicholson (2012) Amateur Film: Meaning and Practice, 1927-77. Manchester: Manchester University Press.
- Laura Rascorolli and Gwenda Young (2014) Amateur Filmmaking: The Home Movie, the Archive and the Web. London: Bloomsbury.
- Ryan Shand and Ian Craven (eds.) (2013) Small Gauge Storytelling: Discovering the Amateur Fiction Film. Edinburgh University Press.
