= City Life (TV series) =

- Genre: Drama
- Created by: James Griffin
- Written by: James Griffin; Maxine Fleming
- Directed by: Wayne Tourell; Colin Budds; Chris Martin-Jones
- Starring: Claudia Black; Jack Campbell; Michelle Huirama; Charles Mesure; Lisa Chappell; John Freeman; Katrina Browne; Peter Muller; Laurie Foell; Oliver Driver
- Country of origin: New Zealand
- Original language: English
- No. of seasons: 1
- No. of episodes: 26

Production
- Executive producers: John Barnett; Rachel Lang
- Producer: Tony Holden
- Cinematography: Matt Bowkett
- Running time: 60 minutes
- Production company: South Pacific Pictures

Original release
- Network: TV2
- Release: 15 July 1996 – 19 February 1998

City Life is a New Zealand soap opera that screened on TV 2 from 1996–98. It was portrayed the lives and loves of ten singles who lived in an upmarket apartment building in Auckland, New Zealand. The show was touted as New Zealand's answer to Melrose Place.

The show starred Claudia Black, Lisa Chappell, Laurie Foell and Oliver Driver and featured a guest appearance by well known New Zealand actor, Kevin Smith.

The show had a long development period, and the original treatment for the show had it set in Wellington with the working title 96 Oriental Parade. However, it was decided to produce the show in Auckland instead, and as such, the shows setting was changed along with the name to City Life.

The first episode began with a controversial first scene, featuring a drunken Damon (Kevin Smith) who owned the apartment building, in a homosexual kiss with his former lover Ryan on the night before his wedding. Damon was later killed off in the same episode after being hit by a car on the way to his wedding, and he left his apartment building to all of his friends. However, Damon's fianceè vowed to fight for her share of Damon's estate, leading to a storyline that would span the show's first five episodes.

The show initially rated well but executives were somewhat alarmed by a major drop in the show's audience in the first five minutes of the first episode (believed to be the result of the kiss between Damon and Ryan). Within weeks ratings had dropped to the point where the show was placed in a later timeslot. A few weeks later, the show was taken off air entirely, after ten episodes had been screened. The show was not brought back until late 1997, and the remaining episodes were screened until the beginning of 1998. The series has never been repeated.

The success of the first season prompted broadcasters from over eighty countries being interested in buying rights for the show, including proposals from three major networks in Britain and Australia. In late August 1996, however, it moved from its key 8:30pm timeslot to 9:35pm, being displaced in favour of Chicago Hope, which was experiencing a ratings upsurge in the United States.

== Cast and characters ==
- Claudia Black as Angela Kostapas, a corporate lawyer, who later quits her cushy position and tries her hand at legal aid. She shares a past with Aaron (they had an affair and she ended up aborting his baby) and is accidentally responsible for the death of Damon South (Kevin Smith) in the first episode.
- Jack Campbell as Aaron Kellett, who despite being a member of the wealthy Kellett family, is a somewhat shady character who shares a past with Angela. Aaron has made a career for himself in event management, organising dance parties and other similar events. During the course of the series, he becomes involved with drug dealing.
- Lisa Chappell as Bronwyn Kellett, Aaron's spoilt sister who runs an art gallery. Her privileged Pakeha views often clash with Wiki's Maori sensibilities, though the two are usually close friends.
- Charles Mesure as Ryan Waters, a gay bartender, who begins the series in love with Damon South. Later on he agrees to donate sperm to his boss Mia (played by Donogh Rees), whose husband can't have children. Ryan has a habit of falling for men who do not return the same level of affection, such as his best friend Damon South and later Michael Lee (Kenneth Moraleda).
- Michelle Huirama as Wiki Taylor, an aspiring actress of Maori descent. Her ambition to become famous often leads her into sticky situations, most notably when she is raped while filming a love scene for a movie.
- John Freeman as Gideon Miller, an economist who used to work for the New Zealand treasury. He is known to his friends for his habit of one-night stands, but falls deeply in love with Siobhan (Rachel Blakely), a drug addict early in the series.
- Katrina Browne as Kristen Wood, a somewhat ditzy university student, Kristen considers herself to be a slacker and indulges herself by spending copious amounts of time on the internet discussing conspiracy theories. While this makes Kristen a nerd in the eyes of some, she is also spectacularly beautiful, a fact that Kristen seems totally unaware of. Kristen finally forms a relationship with her best friend Josh and loses her virginity to him after seemingly being frigid and uninterested in men throughout the series.
- Peter Muller as Hugh Campbell, a photographer who has the unfortunate curse of being unlucky in love, having a few disastrous flings over the course of the series.
- Laurie Foell as Stephanie Cox, a former children's television presenter who longs to become a serious journalist. She is estranged from her parents as her father pimped her out to one of his friends when she was a teenager. This experience has affected her relationships with men.
- Oliver Driver as Josh Gribble, an aspiring comedian who is often the source of humour for the series and is best known for his sarcastic one liners. Josh develops a crush on his best friend Kristen, which eventually leads to a relationship.

== Websites ==
http://www.tv.com/city-life/show/2481/summary.html
