= Augusta, Texas =

- Unincorporated community
- Location within Texas Location within the United States
- Coordinates: 31°31′54″N 95°19′51″W
- Country: United States
- State: Texas
- County: Houston
- Elevation: 374 ft (114 m)
- Time zone: UTC-6 (Central (CST))
  - Summer (DST): UTC-5 (CDT)
- Area codes: 430 & 903
- GNIS feature ID: 1384223

Augusta is an unincorporated community in Houston County, Texas, United States. According to the Handbook of Texas, the community had a population of 20 in 2000.

== History ==
On October 18, 1838, the community was the scene of a massacre. Four historical markers stand at the site of the massacre, which took the lives of early settlers and Native Americans.

== Geography ==
Augusta is located on Farm to Market Road 227, 16 mi (26 km) northeast of Crockett in northeastern Houston County.

== Education ==
W.M. Waddell was the teacher at the Augusta Male and Female Academy in 1860. The community had a school in 1885. Local students (if any) go to school in the Grapeland ISD.

== In popular culture ==
Augusta was featured in the Scott Nixon home movie The Augustas.

== See also ==
- Twenty-first Texas Legislature
