= Badjelly the Witch =

1973 book by Spike Milligan

- First edition
- Author: Spike Milligan
- Illustrator: Spike Milligan
- Language: English
- Genre: Children's literature
- Publisher: Hobbs & Michael Joseph
- Publication date: 1973
- Publication place: United Kingdom
- Media type: Print (Hardback & Paperback)
- ISBN: 0718111125

Badjelly the Witch is a brief handwritten, illustrated story by Spike Milligan, created for his children, then printed in 1973. It was made into an audio and a video version.

In 1975, in the planning for an audio version for the BBC "infant's programme" Let's Join In, Milligan objected to the planned removal of God from the story. The BBC wrote in a letter that the object was not to put God on the same level as goblins, to which Milligan replied that goblins, fairies and God all exist. However, he allowed God to be removed.

In 1974, Ed Welch set Badjelly the Witch to music and the LP was released on Polydor Records. Milligan narrated it with a large orchestra, and the LP was a reasonable success. In New Zealand, where it was regularly played on morning radio, it was a huge success and has sold over 40,000 recordings up to 2012.

== Synopsis ==
In the story, two children named Tim and Rose are looking for their lost cow called Lucy. They meet a slew of characters in an enchanted forest, including one named Dinglemouse. They are captured by Badjelly the Witch, and then rescued by an eagle named Jim. God intervenes as they escape, and the witch is destroyed when she attempts to "scratch God's eyes out". The characters enchanted by Badjelly are rescued.

== Film ==
In 2000, Ragdoll Productions and Norma Farnes Management had collaborated on a film based on the book for CBBC and it aired on Christmas Day. Spike Milligan, the book's writer, narrated the movie. Milligan also wrote and starred as himself. The characters in the film were all voiced by Spike, while Tim and Rose were voiced by child actors Sarah Wichall and Jake Dudley.

== Animated series ==
In 2023, it was announced an animated series based on the book was in production. The series was released on 1 January 2025 in New Zealand. It features the voices of Miriam Margolyes and Rhys Darby.

== Theatre ==
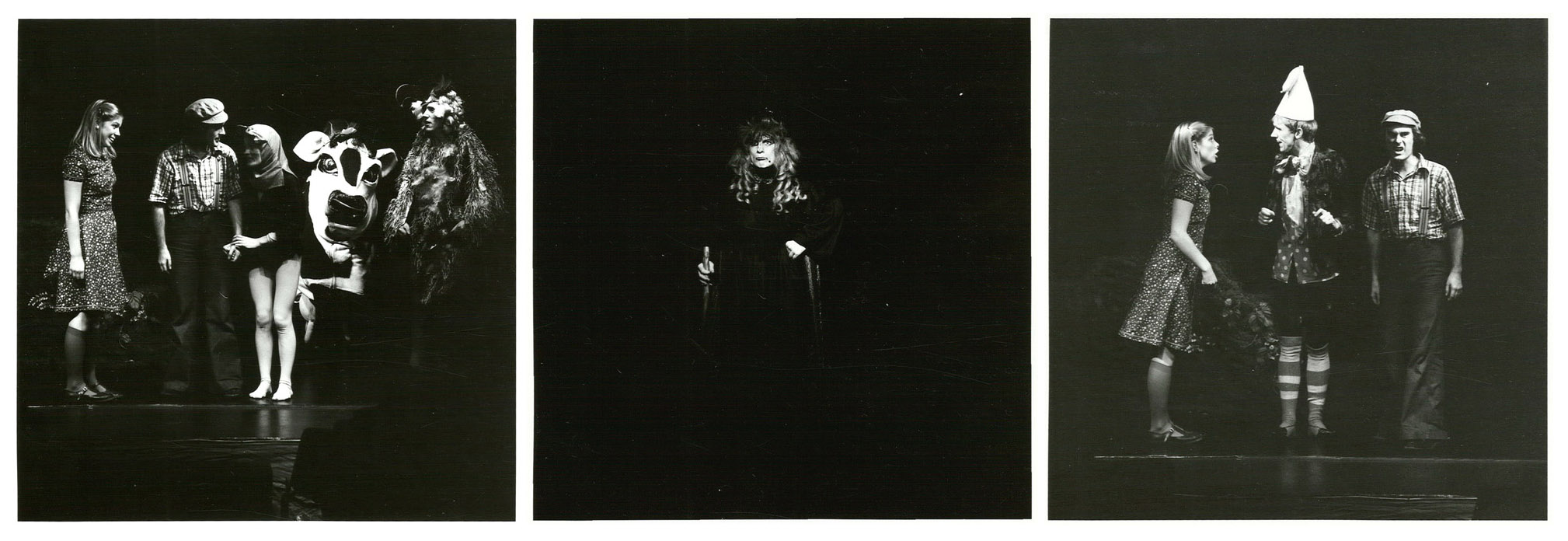
Theatre 87 Production of "Bad Jelly the Witch" in Wellington, June 1978

Alannah O'Sullivan's 1977 adaptation of Badjelly the Witch is the most licensed New Zealand Play. It was first professionally produced by Company Theatre, Tauranga and has had over 100 productions throughout New Zealand. Playmarket published the script in their New Zealand Theatrescripts series edited by David Carnegie.

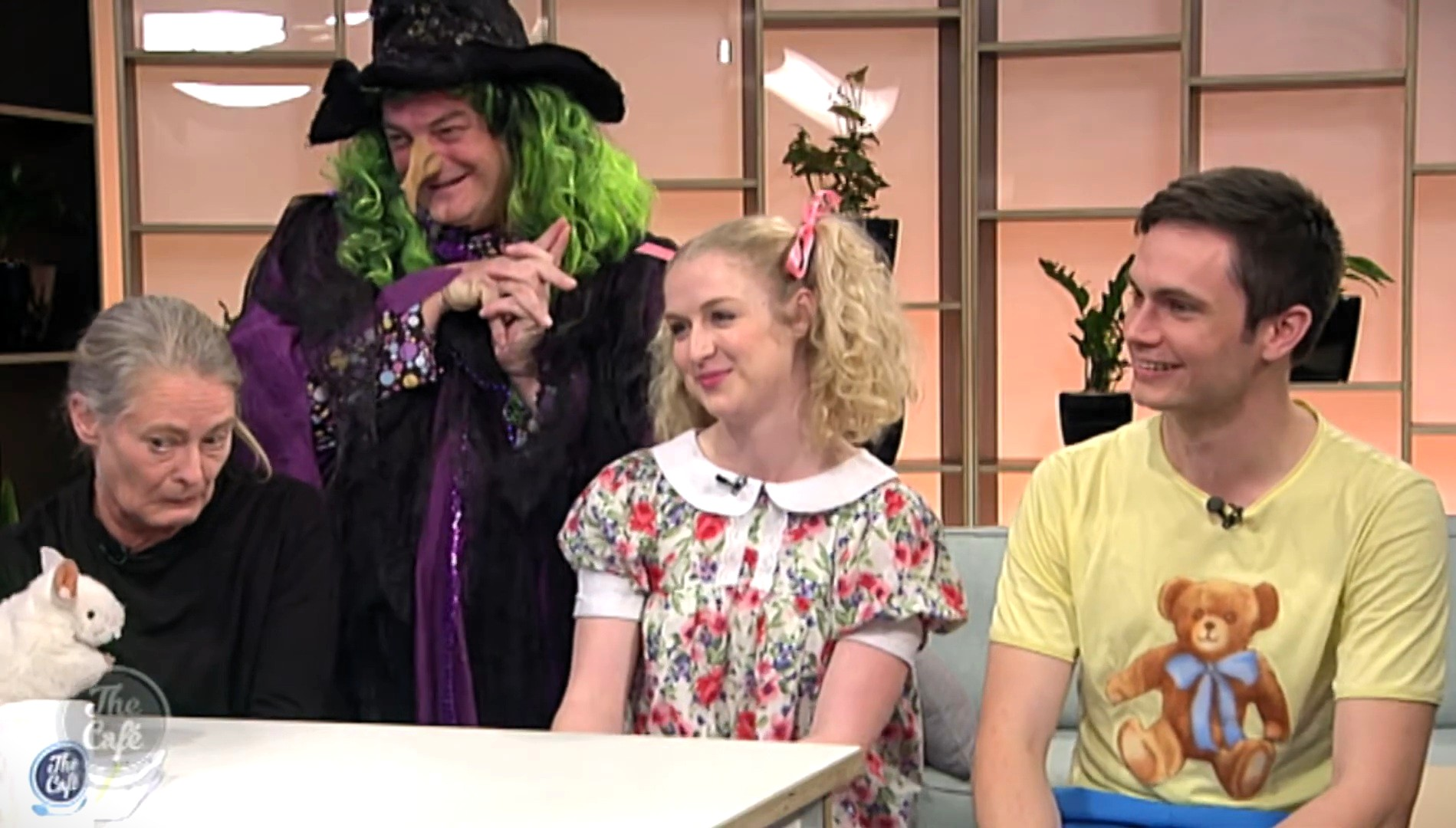
New Zealand cast of "Bad Jelly The Witch" in 2018; left to right: Donogh Rees, Tim Bray, Jessica Hunt, Jacob Dale.

In 2010, 2016, 2018 and 2022, Tim Bray Productions presented its version of 'Badjelly the Witch' on stage at The PumpHouse Theatre, Takapuna, Auckland, New Zealand. Tim Bray adapted and directed the book into a stage play and included The Goons' 'Ying Tong' song along with Monty Pythonesque comedy. The script is available through Playmarket, New Zealand's script agency. Both seasons were hugely successful.

In 2010/11, there was a production created by the Chickenshed Theatre Company called Badjelly's Bad Christmas, with Badjelly the Witch, along with many other characters created by Milligan such as Sir Nobonk and King Twytt, as the main characters.

The show was performed for a season during 2006 for the New Theatre, Sydney, New South Wales. The show was directed by Rosane McNamara, and featured actors Vanessa Caswill, Jodine Muir, David Walker and Richie Black.

== See also ==
- Sir Nobonk and the Terrible Dreadful Awful Naughty Nasty Dragon, a similar novel also written by Spike Milligan
