= What Lola Wants =

- Film poster
- Directed by: Rupert Glasson
- Written by: Rupert Glasson
- Produced by: Ayisha Davies; Monnie Wills
- Starring: Sophie Lowe
- Cinematography: Eric Leach
- Music by: John Gray
- Production companies: Cruzach Films; The Bubble Factory
- Distributed by: Anchor Bay Entertainment
- Release date: June 12, 2015 (LA Film Festival)
- Running time: 81 minutes
- Country: United States
- Language: English

What Lola Wants is a 2015 American action thriller film written and directed by Rupert Glasson and starring Sophie Lowe.

== Cast ==
- Sophie Lowe as Lola
- Beau Knapp as Marlo
- Dale Dickey as Mama
- Robert Taylor as Jed
- Charles S. Dutton as Cop
- Nathan Sapsford as Store Owner
