= Jamie Selkirk =

New Zealand film editor and film producer

James William Arthur "Jamie" Selkirk is a New Zealand film editor and producer. He is particularly noted for his work on The Lord of the Rings film trilogy, which he co-produced with Peter Jackson. He received the Academy Award for Best Film Editing for the last film of the trilogy, The Return of the King (2003).

== Life ==
He began his work in the entertainment industry with the New Zealand Broadcasting Corporation. He moved to editorial as a trainee editor and began cutting newsreels, current affairs, documentaries, and dramas.

Selkirk has a longstanding collaboration with director Peter Jackson. He worked as the editor, sound editor, and postproduction supervisor for Jackson's films Bad Taste, Meet the Feebles, and Heavenly Creatures. Selkirk was both associate producer and editor for Jackson's Braindead in 1992, and became a full producer (and editor) on The Frighteners. Like Jackson, Selkirk has continued to live and work in New Zealand despite the international success of his work.

In addition to his work as a producer on the Lord of the Rings Trilogy, Selkirk worked as the supervising editor for the first two films The Fellowship of the Ring and The Two Towers. John Gilbert and Michael Horton were nominated for the Academy Award for Best Film Editing for those films. Selkirk had once thought he would edit all three films himself; in the end, he edited only the third film. In an interview Daniel Restuccio, he commented wryly, "I always liked that script best."

Selkirk has been elected as a member of the American Cinema Editors.

He was married to the late Ann Selkirk. He and Ann are partial owners of The Roxy Cinema in Miramar, Wellington, New Zealand.

== Selected filmography ==
- A Woman of Good Character (1980) (editor)
- Squeeze (1980) (editor)
- The Silent One (1984) (editor)
- Bad Taste (1987) (editor)
- Meet the Feebles (1989) (editor)
- Old Scores (1991) (editor)
- Braindead aka Dead Alive (1992) (associate producer, editor)
- Heavenly Creatures (1994) (editor)
- Jack Brown Genius (1994) (executive producer, editor)
- The Frighteners (1996) (producer, editor)
- Larger than Life (1997) (producer)
- Wasted (1998) (executive producer)
- The Lord of the Rings: The Fellowship of the Ring (2001) (co-producer, supervising editor)
- The Lord of the Rings: The Two Towers (2002) (co-producer, supervising editor)
- The Long and Short of It (co-producer)
- The Lord of the Rings: The Return of the King (2003) (editor, co-producer)
- King Kong (2005) (editor)
