= Birdie (film) =

2018 short film by Shelly Lauman

- Film poster
- Directed by: Shelly Lauman
- Screenplay by: Shelly Lauman
- Produced by: Lizzie Cater
- Starring: Maeve Dermody; Sam Parsonson; Joshua Brennan; Lynette Curran; Eden Falk
- Cinematography: Anna Howard
- Edited by: Danielle Boesenberg
- Production companies: Australian Directors' Guild; Metro Screen
- Distributed by: Fox Searchlight Pictures
- Release date: August 12, 2018 (Melbourne International Film Festival)
- Running time: 8 minutes
- Country: Australia
- Language: English

Birdie is a 2018 short drama film, directed by Shelly Lauman. It premiered at the 2018 Melbourne International Film Festival, followed by screenings at AFI Fest and the 2018 Toronto International Film Festival, where it was then acquired by Fox Searchlight Pictures, making it the first short film to be distributed by the studio.

== Premise ==
A woman walks alone to the train station. As she descends the stairs to the underground platform she smiles at a young man, he smiles back. With the smallest of gestures, the woman becomes caught in a subtle and sinister game.
