= Disneyland Dream =

- DVD cover
- Directed by: Robbins Barstow
- Written by: Robbins Barstow
- Starring: Robbins Barstow; Meg Barstow; Mary Barstow; David Barstow; Daniel Barstow
- Narrated by: Robbins Barstow (1995 voice-over)
- Edited by: Robbins Barstow
- Production companies: BTA Films & Video, Wethersfield, Connecticut, USA
- Release date: 1956
- Running time: 35 minutes
- Country: United States
- Language: English (1995 voice-over)

Disneyland Dream (1956) is a home movie made by Robbins and Meg Barstow that documents their family's free trip to the newly opened Disneyland. The one-week trip was a prize they won in a contest sponsored by Scotch tape. The movie was shot with a 16 mm handheld camera. It lasts approximately 35 minutes. An audio track was added to the film in 1995.

The Barstows lived in Wethersfield, Connecticut. They flew to California with TWA and stayed at the Huntington-Sheraton Hotel in Pasadena. They visited other Southern California locations, including Knott's Berry Farm, Hollywood, Grauman's Chinese Theatre, Beverly Hills, Universal Studios, Will Rogers' home and Catalina Island on their July 1956 trip.

Comedian Steve Martin, who worked at Disneyland as a teen, appears briefly at 20:20 into the film, selling programs as he walks left to right in the lower right part of the frame, dressed in top hat, dark vest, and a pink striped shirt.

== National Film Registry ==
In 2008, Disneyland Dream was selected for preservation in the United States National Film Registry by the Library of Congress as being "culturally, historically, or aesthetically significant". The National Film Registry cited its "fantastical historical snapshots" of SoCal culture and the budding importance of the home movies in "American cultural studies as they provide priceless and authentic record of time and place."

Commenting on the selection of Disneyland Dream into the National Film Registry, Robbins Barstow stated: "I think it's because it gives a picture of a representative American middle class family that's functional".
