= The Valley (1976 film) =

1976 film by Peter Jackson

- Directed by: Peter Jackson
- Starring: Ken Hammon; Peter Jackson; Andrew Neal
- Edited by: Peter Jackson
- Release date: 1976
- Running time: 20 minutes
- Country: New Zealand
- Language: English

The Valley is a 1976 New Zealand adventure fantasy short amateur film made by a then fifteen-year-old Peter Jackson with his friends. Combining live action and stop motion animation, it was strongly influenced by the films of Ray Harryhausen. It was filmed silent on a Super 8 camera and was shown on the children's television show Spot On.

== Plot ==
Four prospectors walk into a valley and unwittingly enter a rift in the time/space continuum. As they journey down the valley, one of the prospectors (Ian Middleton) gets taken away by a harpy. Another prospector (Peter Jackson) falls off a cliff. The two remaining (Ken Hammon and Andrew Neal) have to fight and destroy a cyclops. They build a raft, float across a lake, and see a building in ruins. This ruin, unbeknownst to them, is the Beehive building of Wellington city – they have not travelled back in time but ahead into a post-apocalyptic world taken over by mythical beasts.

== Cast ==
- Andrew Neal as Prospector #1
- Ken Hammon as Prospector #2
- Ian Middleton as Prospector #3
- Peter Jackson as Prospector #4
- Pete O'Herne stars in an unidentified role

== Reception ==
The short has been described as "a tribute to special effects master Ray Harryhausen".
