= The Augustas =

1930 film

- Directed by: Scott Nixon
- Written by: Scott Nixon
- Cinematography: Scott Nixon
- Edited by: Scott Nixon
- Release date: 1930
- Running time: 16 minutes
- Country: United States
- Language: Silent

The Augustas (filmed in the 1930s and the 1940s) is a home movie made by Scott Nixon, a traveling insurance agent from Augusta, Georgia and an avid member of the Amateur Cinema League who enjoyed recording his life and travels on film. It lasts approximately 16 minutes.

== Description ==
The silent film documents approximately 38 cities, towns, and locations named "Augusta" across the Eastern, Midwestern, Central, and Southern United States. Arranged in no specific order, the film strings together brief scenes and shots of these communities, indicated through intertitles, postcards, or the point of a pencil on a train timetable or road map. The scenes vary, ranging from street scenes and landscapes to shots focusing on local businesses, post offices, train stations, business signs, street signs (typically town signs or fingerposts), and prominent buildings in each town, most of which usually have "Augusta" featured.

Nixon recorded The Augustas using both 8 mm and 16 mm movie cameras loaded with both black-and-white and color film stock. Throughout his life, Nixon recorded over 76,000 feet of film. His work, including The Augustas, currently resides in the collection of the University of South Carolina.

Nixon later made a similar film, Augustas of the USA, around the 1960s. Approximately 5 minutes in length, Augustas of the USA features significantly less "Augustas", with many appearing in name only, but includes new footage, including aerial views from a small plane and scenes in Augusta, Georgia.

== "Augustas" featured ==
- Augusta, Kansas
- Augusta, New Jersey
- Augusta, Indianapolis, Indiana
- New Augusta, Indianapolis, Indiana
- Augusta, Missouri
- Augusta, Maryland, a spot on the former Baltimore and Ohio Railroad Washington County branch line
- Augusta, Arkansas
- Augusta, Maine
- Augusta, Kentucky
- Augusta, Michigan
- Augusta, Illinois
- Staunton, Virginia (located in Augusta County, Virginia)
- Augusta Springs, Virginia
- West Augusta, Virginia
- Augusta, Ohio
- Augusta, West Virginia
- Augusta, New Hampshire
- Augusta, Minnesota
- Augustaville, Pennsylvania
- Fort Augusta, Sunbury, Pennsylvania
- Augusta, Iowa
- Augusta, Oklahoma
- Augusta, Texas
- Augusta Avenue, Savannah, Georgia
- Augusta Road and Augusta Street, Greenville, South Carolina
- South Augusta, Augusta, Georgia
- Augusta, Georgia
- New Augusta, Mississippi
- Augusta, Avoyelles Parish, Louisiana
- Augusta, Plaquemines Parish, Louisiana
- Augusta, Iberville Parish, Louisiana
- Augusta, Montana

== National Film Registry ==
On December 19, 2012, The Augustas was selected for preservation in the United States National Film Registry by the Library of Congress as being "culturally, historically, or aesthetically significant".
