= Pete O'Herne =

New Zealand actor

- O'Herne in Bad Taste (1987)
- Born: 30 November 1961; Wellington, New Zealand
- Died: 12 December 2010 (aged 49); Wellington, New Zealand
- Occupation: Actor
- Years active: 1975–2010

Peter O'Herne (30 November 1961 – 12 December 2010) was a New Zealand actor, known for his collaborations with director Peter Jackson. He appears in Jackson directed films The Valley (1976) and Bad Taste (1987).

He died in 2010 of heart failure.

== Early life ==
O'Herne was born 30 November 1961 in Wellington, New Zealand. He became friends with future Hollywood director Peter Jackson at the age of 9.

== Career ==
At the age of 14, O'Herne appeared in Jackson's 1976 short film, The Valley, which aired on the children's television show Spot On. After this, he, Jackson and fellow friends Mike Minett, Craig Smith, Terry Potter, Dean Lawrie and Ken Hammon worked on their next project, Bad Taste (1987). The film took four years to create, only filmed on weekends when the friends were able to meet up. O'Herne later turned down a role in Jackson's 1992 film Braindead. In 2010, he made his first film appearance in nearly 25 years in the American film God of Vampires. This was his final film role.

== Death ==
On 12 December 2010, O'Herne died of congestive heart failure. His funeral was held on 21 December of that year and was attended by Peter Jackson in person, who delivered a speech. He is survived by his brother.

== Personal life ==
O'Herne enjoyed watching science fiction films and television shows such as Star Trek and The X-Files. He also enjoyed horror films such as George A. Romero's Dawn of the Dead. He was also a fan of professional wrestling.

In 1989 he suffered a back injury that severely limited his work opportunities. Despite this, he remained active and frequented the gym in the years before his death.

== Filmography ==
Year	Title	Role	Notes
1976	The Valley	Unknown	Short film
1987	Bad Taste	Barry / 3rd Class Alien	Also miscellaneous crew
1988	Good Taste Made Bad Taste	Himself	Documentary
2010	God of Vampires	The Fixer	Final film role
