= Bad Taste =

1987 film by Peter Jackson

- Promotional release poster
- Directed by: Peter Jackson
- Written by: Peter Jackson
- Produced by: Peter Jackson
- Starring: Terry Potter; Pete O'Herne; Craig Smith; Mike Minett; Peter Jackson
- Cinematography: Peter Jackson
- Edited by: Peter Jackson; Jamie Selkirk
- Music by: Michelle Scullion
- Production companies: WingNut Films; New Zealand Film Commission
- Distributed by: Endeavour Productions
- Release dates: 11 December 1987 (New Zealand); 16 June 1989 (United States)
- Running time: 92 minutes
- Country: New Zealand
- Language: English
- Budget: $400,000

Bad Taste is a 1987 New Zealand science-fiction action comedy horror film written, produced, filmed, directed by and co-starring Peter Jackson. Independently produced on a low budget, it is Jackson's first feature film. Jackson and friends take on most of the key roles, both on and off-screen. The plotline sees aliens invade the fictional New Zealand village of Kaihoro to harvest humans for their intergalactic fast food franchise, where they face off against a four-man paramilitary force. The film was shot in Northern Wellington over the course of four years, and eventually received nearly a quarter of a million dollars in New Zealand Film Commission assistance, providing Jackson with the leverage necessary to advance in the film industry.

Since its release, Bad Taste has become a cult film and has received stronger reviews. In 2008, British film magazine Empire ranked Bad Taste as the 416th greatest film ever made.

== Plot ==
After the town of Kaihoro's entire population disappear, the Astro Investigation and Defence Service (AIDS) sends their agents Derek, Frank, Ozzy, and Barry to investigate. They find the town overrun by man-eating aliens disguised as humans in blue shirts. Barry kills one of the aliens and is attacked by others. After Derek notifies Frank and Ozzy, he begins torturing Robert, an alien they caught earlier. Robert's screaming attracts a number of aliens. Derek kills the would-be rescuers, but he is attacked by Robert and falls off a cliff ledge, to his presumed death.

Meanwhile, charity collector Giles passes through Kaihoro. He escapes Robert's attack and comes to nearby house for help, only to get captured by another alien. Giles later wakes up in a tub of water filled with vegetables and is told he is about to be cooked and eaten. Derek wakes up in a seagull's nest with a hole in his head, so he uses a hat to keep his brains from leaking out.

That night, Frank, Ozzy, and Barry infiltrate the aliens' house and find a room filled with bloody cardboard boxes, likely containing the corpses of former Kaihoro residents. They kill an alien, and Frank wears its shirt to infiltrate their meeting. He learns that the victims have been harvested for food and hears of their recent hostage, Giles. The alien later dines on Robert's vomit, and the disguised (and disgusted) Frank has to follow suit. He escapes and tells the others of the plan. They save Giles as the aliens sleep.

At sunrise, they try to leave but are attacked by the aliens, and a gunfight ensues. Derek emerges and joins the fight, using his belt as a headband when the hat is shot off. He grabs a chainsaw from the boot of his car and heads for the aliens' house. As the group leaves with Giles, the alien leader (Lord Crumb) and his followers morph into their true form and follow. Ozzy uses a rocket launcher to explode Frank's car, which has been overrun by aliens.

Frank and Ozzy hunt for Lord Crumb and kill many aliens along the way. Meanwhile, Derek kills an alien with his chainsaw and replaces the missing parts of his brain with its brain. An alien prepares to shoot Frank and Ozzy, but it is beheaded by Derek. Frank and Ozzy are shocked to see him alive, and see he has lost his mind.

After they escape the house, Lord Crumb shoots Ozzy in the leg and Frank fires his rocket launcher at the leader, but misses. Lord Crumb knocks out Derek and the house transforms into a giant spaceship and blasts off into space.

On board, Derek looks out the window to see Earth. He ambushes Crumb and kills the alien with his chainsaw. He proclaims war on the alien, then puts on the alien leader's skin and laughs maniacally as he rockets towards the alien planet.

Back on Earth, the survivors drive away in Derek's car.

== Cast ==
- Terry Potter as Ozzy / 3rd Class Alien
- Pete O'Herne as Barry / 3rd Class Alien
- Peter Jackson as Derek / Robert
- Mike Minett as Frank / 3rd Class Alien
- Craig Smith as Giles Copeland / 3rd Class Alien
- Doug Wren as Lord Crumb
  - Dean Lawrie as Lord Crumb SPFX double / 3rd Class Alien
  - Peter Vere-Jones as Lord Crumb's voice
- Ken Hammon as 3rd Class Alien
- Costa Botes as 3rd Class Alien

== Production ==
Much of the film was shot in and around Jackson's home suburb of Pukerua Bay in northern Wellington, using a 25-year-old 16mm Bolex camera. Originally begun as a 20-minute short film called Roast of the Day, Bad Taste was shot primarily on weekends over the course of four years, at an initial cost of around $25,000. Toward the end of the shoot the New Zealand Film Commission invested around NZ$235,000 at the time (equivalent to US$393,000 today) into the film to ensure its completion. Heavily influenced by special effects pioneer Tom Savini, Jackson incorporated many absurdly gory special effects.

Peter Jackson himself plays two acting roles. In one early scene halfway down a cliff, careful editing, utilising shots taken months apart, makes it possible for the two characters, Derek and the alien Robert (both played by Jackson), to fight one another.

Bad Taste begins Jackson's penchant for using the Morris Minor in his films—‌in this film Giles drives a Morris Minor. Subsequently, every car in Meet the Feebles is a Morris Minor (including a limousine) and several are seen in Braindead.

A combination of blank firing firearms and homemade weapon props were used in the film. Most of the firearm props were made using recycled aluminium and wood. The actors also had to shake them to simulate the recoil. A flash and sound effect was added later during post production.

All the alien masks in the film were baked in Peter Jackson's mother's oven.

Kaihoro, the name of the town whose inhabitants are butchered, is a Māori word coined by Jackson and his crew early in the shooting of the film. It has two parts: "kai" which means food and "horo" which means town or village. Foodtown is also the name of a New Zealand chain of grocery stores. Kai horo in Te Reo Maori means 'greedy', but is made up of the words Kai (food) and horo (quickly) which, loosely translated, could be said to mean fast food, a play on the fate of the villagers.

The sheep in the film was to have played a larger role as a running gag, being surprisingly aggressive and chasing "The Boys" at various points throughout. This was reduced to the single sheep/rocket launcher moment of the final scene.

== Release ==
The film sold to many countries after playing in the market at the 1987 Cannes Film Festival. Despite its wide acclaim, the film failed to impress at the 1989 NZ Film and Television Awards, winning no awards. As well as this, a TVNZ executive spoke out the next day about whether or not the film industry needed films like Bad Taste. The film did however still win favour among the country's cult film audiences. In France, the film received 29,339 admissions.

== Reception ==
Kim Newman of Empire gave the film three stars out of five, with praise being directed to the special effects. For AllMovie, Jason Buchanan wrote that Bad Taste was "amazingly resourceful," but that it moves at such a "hyperactive" pace that "it's nearly impossible to draw a breath, much less take a moment to laugh at the revoltingly hilarious exploits." In a much less positive review, Time Out summarised that although "the film had its moments," it was not a worthwhile watch.

The film holds a 73% approval rating on review aggregator website Rotten Tomatoes, based on 22 reviews with an average rating of 6.50/10. The site's consensus reads: "Peter Jackson's early low-budget shocker boasts a disgusting premise—‌aliens harvesting humans for fast food—‌that gives the budding auteur plenty of room for gross-out visuals and absurd cleverness." On Metacritic, the film holds a score of 52 out of 100 based on reviews by 4 critics, indicating "mixed or average reviews."

== Censorship ==
The banning of an already cut version of Bad Taste in Queensland, Australia, three weeks into its run, led to the firing and dissolution of the Queensland Film Board of Review in 1990. The film had to be trimmed for release in Australia at the time, as the OFLC felt the gore too excessive. When released on home video in Australia, the words "Banned in Queensland" was proclaimed on the cover. The uncut version was released by Universal Home Entertainment on DVD in 2004.

Apart from the uncut version, there is a heavily cut FSK 18-rated and an even more censored FSK 12-rated version in Germany available on DVD. The former is cut by approximately 6 minutes, the latter by approximately 10 minutes.

== Home media ==
In the U.S., the film arrived on home video through independent Magnum Entertainment on June 22, 1989. It was backed by a relatively large promotional campaign for a niche release, with Magnum mailing 22,000 eight-page brochures to retailers, while the tapes were accompanied by window decals proclaiming "We've Got Bad Taste." The film was first released on DVD in 2001 by Anchor Bay Entertainment. In December 2018, Peter Jackson announced that he plans to restore Bad Taste, along with his two following films Meet the Feebles and Braindead (known as Dead Alive in North America) for a possible 4K release.

== Legacy ==
During his acceptance speech at the 2004 Academy Awards, Jackson mentioned Bad Taste (along with Meet the Feebles), joking that it had been "wisely overlooked by the Academy."

In 2008, Empire ranked Bad Taste as the 416th greatest film of all time, based on opinions from readers and industry professionals.

== See also ==
- Braindead (film)
- Under the Skin, a novel by Michel Faber where aliens hiding in rural Scotland gruesomely farm humans for overpriced food.
- List of films with the longest production time
- List of cult films

== Bibliography ==
- Barratt, Jim (2008). Bad taste. London: Wallflower Press. ISBN 9781905674879. OCLC 226360301.
