= Margaret Escott =

NZ novelist, drama teacher, poet

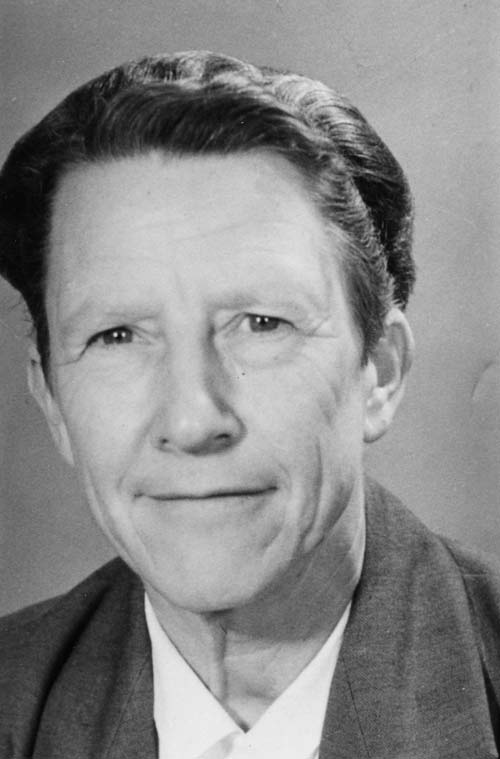
- Margaret Escott, c. 1948
- Born: Cicely Margaret Escott; 9 July 1908; Eltham, Kent, England
- Died: 15 August 1977 (aged 69); Waitemata Harbour, New Zealand
- Occupations: Novelist; poet; playwright; drama teacher
- Writing career
- Pen name: C. M. Allen
- Period: 1930s, 1970s
- Notable work: Show Down or I Told My Love (1936)

Cicely Margaret Escott (9 July 1908 – 15 August 1977) was a New Zealand novelist, playwright, poet and drama teacher. She was best known for her novel Show Down, published in 1936. The United States edition was titled I Told My Love. A second edition was published in New Zealand in 1973. In later life she worked in theatre, and wrote a final volume of poems shortly before her death.

== Early life ==
Escott was born in Eltham, Kent, England, to Emily Allen and her husband Harry Escott, a bank clerk. She was the youngest of their five children, and was educated at the City of London School for Girls. She moved to New Zealand when she was 17, where the family stayed temporarily on a farm in the Waikato district. After her parents settled in Auckland, she worked for a year as a teacher at Seddon Memorial Technical College, and then in 1928 returned to London alone where she worked at The Times Book Club, first as a lift attendant and then as a librarian.

== Literary career ==
Escott wrote her only three novels in the 1930s before the age of 26. Her first two novels were under the pen name C. M. Allen, and both were set in England: the first, Insolence of Office (1934) was about a talented lower-middle-class musician torn between her love for a violinist and her distaste for his decadent lifestyle, and the second, Awake at Noon (1935), was about a female doctor who advocates for exploited nurses and a labour leader who works for the unemployed. Escott had been reluctant to send Show Down to her agent because of its New Zealand setting, but after he requested unpublished work, she sent it through, and it was taken on by a London publisher. It was also published in New York under the name I Told My Love.

Show Down was about a Waikato farmer who falls in love with a wealthy Englishwoman, newly arrived in New Zealand, and their relationship through a bigamous marriage (as the farmer has a wife living in England) and subsequent affairs. It was commercially successful and well-reviewed, acclaimed as "direct" and "very modern". Escott's writing was compared favourably to Ernest Hemingway's writing by several reviewers. The New York Times reviewer felt the novel at times seemed "a little calculated, a little overstrained", but nevertheless found it "excellently written" and that there was no doubt that Escott was "a writer of great talent, with a fine sense of form and a subtle understanding of emotion". The Auckland Star said it was a "considerable achievement" and that "the author's imaginative insight and literary craftsmanship are such that Show Down will be judged abroad on its merits, and not as 'a New Zealand novel'". The New Zealand Herald praised the "sheer vigour and emotional power of a novel" and said that it was "pleasing that such a novel has been written by a New Zealand writer, and all the more surprising that it has been written by a woman".

The novel was published under the name "M Escott" and it was speculated by the literary community in New Zealand that the real author was Mary Scott, writing under a pseudonym similar to her own name. Some reviewers overseas assumed that the author was a man; The Spectator referred to Mr. Escott in its review.

== Later life ==
After the success of Show Down, Escott returned to New Zealand, where she worked on her brother's farm for a period and then moved to Auckland. She worked as a drama teacher, librarian, tutor, and broadcaster, and is said to have destroyed most of her writing from this time. Her main surviving work from her later years is the play Saved, which she wrote in 1971 to commemorate Auckland's centenary. Show Down was published in a new edition by Auckland University Press in the New Zealand Fiction Series in 1973. She was an advocate for the saving of the old pumphouse building at Lake Pupuke and a founding member of its trust board when it was opened as the PumpHouse Theatre in 1977, the year of her death. She is said to be the "resident ghost" of the PumpHouse Theatre, and the green room is named in her honour.

Escott's final work, a volume of poetry titled Separation and/or Greeting, was written in the months prior to her death in 1977, at Waitemata Harbour in New Zealand. In March 2007, Elspeth Sandys adapted Show Down as a radio play, broadcast by Radio New Zealand. On 16 November 2020, the PumpHouse Theatre held an evening event titled "Celebrating Peg Escott: Writer, Poet, Playwright and Friend of The PumpHouse".

== Selected works ==
- Allen, C. M. (1934). Insolence of office. London: Sampson Low and Company.
- Allen, C. M. (1935). Awake at Noon. A Novel. London: Sampson Low and Company.
- Escott, Margaret (1936). Show Down. Chatto & Windus.
  - Published in the U.S. as: Escott, Margaret (1936). I Told My Love. New York: W. W. Norton & Company.
- Escott, Margaret (1980). Separation and/or greeting. Auckland University Press. ISBN 9780196479811.
- Escott, Margaret (1971). Saved (play), first performed 1977 at the PumpHouse Theatre.
