= Michelle Scullion =

New Zealand composer and musician

Michelle Scullion (born 1957) is a New Zealand musician and composer. Several of her soundscapes are part of installations at Museum of New Zealand Te Papa Tongarewa.

== Biography ==
Scullion grew up in Stokes Valley, on the outskirts of Wellington, New Zealand. After high school, she studied music at Wellington Polytechnic and Victoria University of Wellington. Her first major film project was to create the score for Sir Peter Jackson's 1987 film Bad Taste. During her career, she has composed music for commercials, corporate videos, short films, documentaries and feature films. She also performs and records.

In 2003 she was a judge for the Kodak Music Clip Awards at the Wellington Fringe Film Festival.

Scullion started playing the flute when she was 13 years old and also composes music for flute. In 2011 she assembled a group of flautists to perform her works as part of the New Zealand Fringe Festival in Wellington.

== Awards and recognition ==
| Year | Award | Category | Nominated for | Result | Notes |
|---|---|---|---|---|---|
| 2002 | New Zealand Music Awards | Best Children's Album | Peaks to Plains | Nominated | |
| 1996 | TV Guide Film and Television Awards | Best Film Score | Chicken | Nominated | |
| 1990 | New Zealand Film Awards | Best Film Score | Flying Fox in a Freedom Tree | Nominated | |
| 1990 | ITVA Awards (International Television Association) | Music | Our Future Generation | Won | |
| 1989 | Listener Film and Television Awards | Best Film Score | Bad Taste | Nominated | |
