= Coffin Rock =

- Theatrical film poster
- Directed by: Rupert Glasson
- Written by: Rupert Glasson
- Produced by: Ayisha Davies; David Lightfoot
- Starring: Lisa Chappell; Robert Taylor; Sam Parsonson
- Cinematography: David Foreman
- Edited by: Adrian Rostirolla
- Music by: John Gray
- Production company: Head Gear Films
- Distributed by: Ultra Films
- Release date: 22 October 2009
- Running time: 92 minutes
- Country: Australia
- Language: English
- Box office: A$31,312 (Australia)

Coffin Rock is an Australian melodramatic thriller film directed by Rupert Glasson and produced by David Lightfoot. The movie stars Lisa Chappell, Robert Taylor and Sam Parsonson.

== Plot ==
Rob (Robert Taylor) and Jessie (Lisa Chappell) are a married couple who are trying to start a family without any success. Rob is reluctant to seek medical help, which leaves Jessie frustrated at being childless. After a drunken night at a bar with her friend, Jessie returns home upset to find a drifter, Evan (Sam Parsonson), is there with a baby kangaroo. This stirs emotions in Jessie, and she turns her affections towards him in a moment of unhappiness. This one time encounter results in brief sex. Though she asks him to stop midway, he continues on.

Evan becomes increasingly obsessed with her and begins to stalk her. Later Jessie discovers she is pregnant, not knowing for sure who the father is. On discovering she is pregnant she tells her husband, who in turn tells his friends, and the news spreads through the town to the drifter Evan who knows he could be the father. This intensifies his obsession for her and his violence toward others. Motivations to Evan's behavior are hinted at through delusional phone calls to his dead father, whom Evan is revealed to have killed.

After Jessie repeatedly rejects him, Evan knocks Rob unconscious and kidnaps Jessie. After several failed attempts, Jessie manages to escape from Evan and leaves him for dead after crashing the car. Rob, who has learned that he may not be the father, arrives just as Evan is about to attack Jessie. Consumed by guilt, Jessie stands in the middle of the road and closes her eyes. Rob swerves to avoid her and strikes Evan with his car, rescuing his wife. In the final scenes, Rob learns from a fertility clinic that he is not infertile, and Jessie burns the baby cradle that they bought.

== Cast ==
- Lisa Chappell as Jessie Willis
- Robert Taylor as Rob Willis
- Sam Parsonson as Evan
- Joseph Del Re as Benny
- Geoff Morrell as George
- Jodie Dry aa Megan
- Terry Camilleri as Tony

== Release ==
Coffin Rock premiered at the 2009 London FrightFest Film Festival. The film had a limited release at Australian cinemas on 22 October 2009 before being released on DVD. On 13 January 2010, IFC films released the movie in the United States On-demand, but it was later released on 3 February as Video on Demand.

The film is also available on Blu-ray in Australia, released by Pinnacle Films/All Interactive Distribution. A German Blu-ray is also available.

== Reception ==
Rotten Tomatoes, a review aggregator, reports that 70% of 20 surveyed critics gave the film a positive review; the average rating was 6/10. Simon Foster of the Special Broadcasting Service rated it 3.5/5 stars and said that the film "offers up exemplary work by all involved, both in front of and behind the camera" but "falls back on the clichés of the genre occasionally". Bloody Disgusting rated the film 3/5 stars and said, "Although, not an outstanding film, Coffin Rock does have much to recommend it." Gareth Jones of DreadCentral rated the film 2.5/5 stars and called it a "distinctly average psycho-stalker flick". Nigel Floyd of Time Out London rated the film 3/5 stars and said that "the well-crafted characterisation, slow-burning tension and credible situations" of the first half eventually turn into "hysterical excess". Kim Newman of Empire rated the film 3/5 stars and said, "The set-up is deceptively low-key, but the second and third acts deliver textbook suspense and horror." Peter Bradshaw of The Guardian rated it 2/5 stars and called it a "nasty, intermittently effective psychological thriller" that is "generic and workmanlike".

=== Accolades ===
Award	Category	Subject	Result
ASE Award	Best Editing in a Feature Film	Adrian Rostirolla	Nominated
Chicago International Film Festival	Gold Hugo – After Dark Competition	Rupert Glasson	Nominated
Neuchâtel International Fantastic Film Festival	Narcisse Award for Best Feature Film	Rupert Glasson	Nominated

== See also ==
- Cinema of Australia
