= Sir Nobonk and the Terrible Dreadful Awful Naughty Nasty Dragon =

Book by Spike Milligan

- First edition
- Author: Spike Milligan
- Language: English
- Genre: Children's literature
- Publisher: Hobbs & Michael Joseph
- Publication date: 1982
- Publication place: United Kingdom
- Media type: Print (Hardcover & Paperback)
- Pages: c.30 pp (May change depending on the publisher and the size of the text)

Sir Nobonk and the Terrible Dreadful Awful Naughty Nasty Dragon (also known by the shorter title of Sir Nobonk and the... Dragon) is a 1982 comedy novel written by Spike Milligan, and the fourth picture book by Milligan after The Bald Twit Lion, Badjelly the Witch and Dip the Puppy.

== Overview ==
The story of Sir Nobonk is a generic parody of traditional stories about knights and dragons, set within a medieval world with modern anachronisms for comic purposes (such as garden hoses for knights to wash out their armour).

== Plot ==
The story takes place in the mythical Kingdom of Rotten Custard, a kingdom that exists within Cornwall, where knights are constantly at war with the Dragons. Among the knights is a 60-year-old knight named Sir Nobonk, who becomes a dragon-catcher in order to save the dragons from extinction.

Setting forth into the nearby forest, Sir Nobonk successfully captures the last living dragon, and convinces the king to open a zoo to help dragons to repopulate. The plan becomes successful, and also helps humans and dragons to co-exist peacefully within the kingdom.

However, the prosperity of the kingdom provokes a giant named Blackmangle to attack the kingdom along with his servant Witch-Way, leaving it to Sir Nobonk to face the new foes and to save the kingdom.

== Characters ==
- Sir Nobonk - A 60-year-old knight-turned-dragon catcher
- Big Bill - Sir Nobonk's strong but dimwitted groom
- Little Willy - Nobonk's youngest (and most intelligent) groom
- The Wizard of Nothing - An incredibly small dwarf Nobonk encounters whilst hunting for dragons
- Blackmangle - An evil giant who rules over the neighbouring Kingdom of Dangle, who wishes to claim the tame dragons for himself
- Witch Way - Blackmangle's servant, an evil witch
- Daz - Nobonk's white stallion, who eats grass and chips
- King Big-Twytt - Ruler of the Kingdom of Rotten Custard

== Sources ==
- Milligan, S. (1982) Sir Nobonk and the Terrible Dreadful Awful Naughty Nasty Dragon London: Book Club Associates
