= Robert Taylor (Australian actor) =

Australian actor (born 1963)

Robert Taylor OAM
- Born: Robert John Taylor; 1963 (age 62–63); Melbourne, Victoria, Australia
- Education: Western Australian Academy of Performing Arts
- Occupation: Actor
- Years active: 1988–present
- Spouse: Ayisha Davies (m. 2017)
- Children: 1

Robert John Taylor OAM (born 1963) is an Australian actor who has appeared in many films and television series in Australia, the United Kingdom, and the United States. On television, he is known for playing the lead role of Walt Longmire in the A&E/Netflix television series Longmire. His film credits include The Matrix (1999), in which he played Agent Jones, Vertical Limit (2000) and The Meg (2018).

== Early life and education ==
Robert Taylor was born in 1963 in Melbourne, Australia. His parents separated when he was nine, and he moved to a mining town in Western Australia to live with his aunt and uncle.

He attended university three times. He worked as a miner when he was a teenager.

At age 21, Taylor went to work on an oil rig in the Indian Ocean. His ship collided with another and sank off the west coast of Australia, but he and two crew mates escaped on a lifeboat. Taylor suffered a broken arm and ribs.

While recovering in hospital, he saw an advertisement for auditions for drama school in Perth, at the Western Australian Academy of Performing Arts (WAAPA), which he joined after a successful audition at the age of 24.

== Career ==
Taylor started acting professionally in 1988 after graduating from WAAPA. His first major role was in 1989 as Nicholas Walsh in the Australian television soap Home and Away. His first lead role came in 1993 when he was cast as David Griffin in the Australian miniseries The Feds. He then appeared in various guest roles and on television films in Australia, such as Blue Heelers and Stingers, often being cast as a police officer.

Taylor's big break in Hollywood came when he was cast as one of the Agents in the 1999 blockbuster The Matrix. In 2000, he appeared in the action thriller Vertical Limit. His other film credits include The Hard Word (2002), Storm Warning (2007), Rogue (2007), and Coffin Rock (2009).

In 2000, Taylor played Father Vincent Sheehan in Ballykissangel, a British television drama set in Ireland. His television credits after that include MDA (2002), Satisfaction (2010), Cops L.A.C. (2010) and Killing Time (2011). In 2011, Taylor was cast for the lead role of Walt Longmire in A&E's crime drama series Longmire. The series moved to Netflix after the third season. Its sixth and final season was released in 2017.

In April 2024, as his film Kid Snow was in post-production, Taylor was cast as Jackson Gibbs in NCIS: Origins. He plays Colin Lawson in the 2024 Netflix drama series Territory.

In 2025, he was nominated for a Logie award for his work on the Netflix series Territory.

== Personal life ==
Taylor is married to producer Ayisha Davies; they have a daughter, Scarlet.

Taylor co-founded Veg Out, a farmer's market and community gardens in St Kilda, Victoria.

== Filmography ==
=== Film ===
Year	Title	Role	Notes
1997	Phage	Calhoun	
1999	The Matrix	Agent Jones	
2000	Muggers	Detective Constable Porter	
2000	Vertical Limit	Skip Taylor	
2000	After the Rain	Jack Behring	
2002	The Hard Word	Frank Malone	
2003	Ned Kelly	Sherritt Trooper	
2007	Storm Warning	Rob	
2007	Rogue	Everett Kennedy	
2008	Long Weekend	Bartender	
2009	Coffin Rock	Rob Willis	
2014	Healing	Vander	
2014	Turkey Shoot	Ramrod	
2015	Focus	McEwen	
2015	What Lola Wants	Jed	
2015	Downriver	Wayne	
2016	The Menkoff Method	Clive Struthers	
2017	Kong: Skull Island	Captain of the Boat	
2017	Don't Tell	Robert Brewster	
2018	The Meg	Dr. Heller	
2019	Into the Ashes	Frank Parson	
2019	Blood Vessel	Captain Malone	
2022	We Are Still Here	Riley	
2024	Kid Snow	Ed	
2024	Just a Farmer	Owen	
2026	Saccharine	Travis	

=== Television ===
Year	Title	Role	Notes
1988	Danger Down Under	King	Television film
1988	Rafferty's Rules	Constable Hanks	Episode: "Confessions"
1988	Barracuda (aka The Rocks)	Constable Gottlieb	Television film
1988	Something Is Out There	1st officer	2 episodes
1988	The Clean Machine	Constable Ron Healy	Television film
1988	The Flying Doctors	Lachlan McGregor	Episode: "Clapped Out"
1988	Fragments of War: The Story of Damien Parer	Lt. Ellis	Television film
1989	Brotherhood of the Rose	Pollux	2 episodes
1989	Home and Away	Nicholas Walsh	21 episodes
1990	Yellowthread Street	Detective Peter Marenta	7 episodes
1990	The Paper Man	Johnny Coates	6 episodes
1990	G.P.	Greg Mawson	Episode: "Longing"
1992	Steel Justice	Detective Lieutenant David Nash	Television film
1993–1996	The Feds	David Griffin	Lead role
1995	The Last Bullet	Sergeant Caldwell	Television film
1996	Twisted Tales	Peter	Episode: "A Sure Thing"
1996	Flipper	Captain Whitaker	Episode: "Fish Out of Water"
1996	The Thorn Birds: The Missing Years	Jack Cleary	Television film
1998	Good Guys, Bad Guys	Andrew Costello	Episode: "Blood is Thicker Than Walter"
1999	Wildside	Clayton Clark	Episode #2.8
1999	Blue Heelers	Detective Barry Craig	Episodes: "Dirty Money" & "Web of Lies"
1999	Stingers	Detective Sergeant Mick Foley	4 episodes
1999	First Daughter	Mason	Television film
2000	Tales of the South Seas	Tall Bounty Hunter	Episode: "Isabelle's Brother"
2001	Ballykissangel	Father Vincent Sheehan	8 episodes
2002	MDA	Paul Bennett	8 episodes
2004	The Mystery of Natalie Wood	Nicholas Ray	Television film
2005	Hercules	Chiron	2 episodes
2008	City Homicide	Kevin Steele	Episode: "Spoils of War"
2010	Satisfaction	John McCoy	6 episodes
2010	Cops L.A.C.	Tom O'Neill	Episode: "The Learning Curve"
2011	Underbelly Files: Tell Them Lucifer was Here	Deputy Commissioner Graham Sinclair	Television film
2011	Killing Time	Tim Watson-Munro	5 episodes
2011	Twentysomething	Trevor	Episode: "You Only Get One Special Day"
2012–2017	Longmire	Sheriff Walt Longmire	Lead role
2013	Mr & Mrs Murder	Alistair Travers	Episode: "A Flare for Murder"
2016	Wolf Creek	Roland Thorogood	Episode: "Billabong"
2019	Dolly Parton's Heartstrings	Reverend Covern	Episode: "Down from Dover"
2021–23	The Newsreader	Geoff Walters	12 episodes
2023	Scrublands	Harley Reagan	4 episodes
2024	Apples Never Fall	William	Episode: "Joy"
2024	NCIS: Origins	Jackson Gibbs	Recurring role
2024	Territory	Colin Lawson	6 episodes
2026	The Killings at Parrish Station	Michael Thorne (Present day)	TV series
