= The PumpHouse Theatre =

Auckland performance venue

PumpHouse Theatre
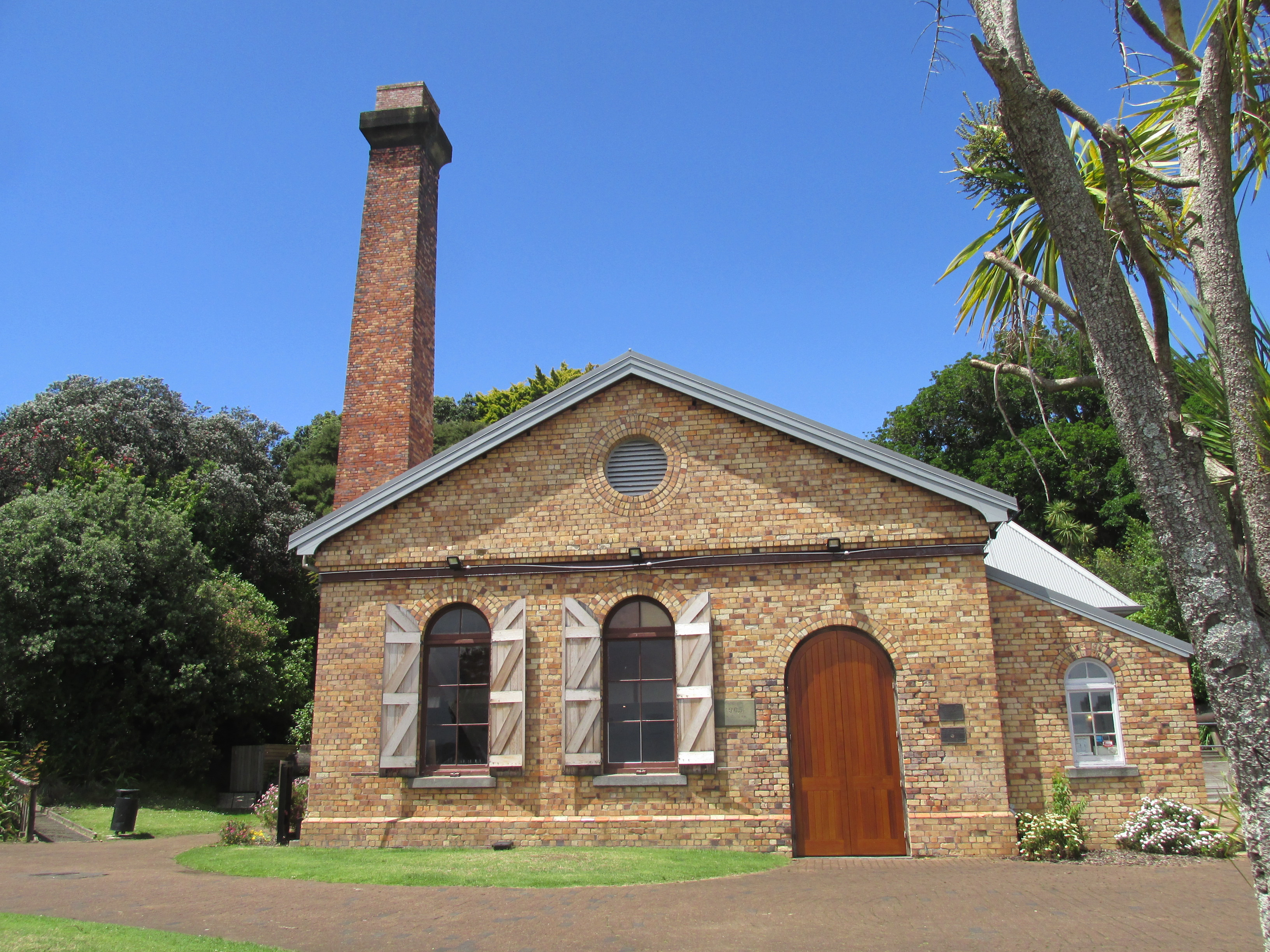
- Interactive map of the PumpHouse Theatre area

General information
- Location: 2a Manurere Avenue, Takapuna, Auckland New Zealand
- Coordinates: 36.7853192°S 174.767757°E
- Completed: 1906
- Owner: North Shore Theatre and Arts Trust (The Pumphouse Theatre)

Design and construction
- Architect: H Metcalfe
- Main contractor: Mays and Gordon

Heritage New Zealand – Category 2
- Designated: 4-April-1983
- Reference no.: 694

The PumpHouse Theatre is a performing arts venue located in Killarney Park on the shore of Lake Pupuke in Takapuna, Auckland, New Zealand. Established in the 1970s in a converted Edwardian water pumping station, it operates as a not-for-profit community theatre. The venue hosts a wide range of productions, including plays, musicals, Shakespearean performances, dance, comedy, concerts, and educational workshops. It is regarded as a significant cultural hub on Auckland’s North Shore, providing a platform for both professional and community-based performing arts groups.

== Historic pumphouse ==
The pumphouse was originally built on the shore of Lake Pupuke as a pumping stations to provide freshwater for the local community. The building was opened in 1906. The pumping machinery was removed in 1931 when a new water supply was sourced from the Waitakere Ranges, and the building was used for water treatment until it was closed in 1941. The building then began to fall into disrepair. In 1968 two hundred people attended a public meeting in support of preserving the building and turning it into an arts venue. Things got heated as local residents clashed with council and North Shore Horticultural Society who also wanted the land. The casting vote of Mayor Fred Thomas saved the building and local residents began work to renovate and convert the derelict building into a community theatre and arts centre.

In 1983, the pumphouse was classified as a Category II Historic Building by The New Zealand Historic Places Trust (now Heritage New Zealand).

== Establishment of the theatre ==
The North Shore Theatre and Arts Trust (The Pumphouse Theatre) was established as a Registered Charitable Trust in 1971. Major fundraising began with the establishment of the annual "PumpHouse Picnics".

The PumpHouse was converted to a theatre and arts centre, and opened in 1977 by Takapuna City Council Mayor Fred Thomas. Margaret Escott was a founding member of the trust board and was a writer and director. She wrote the play Saved that opened the theatre, a melodrama set in colonial Auckland. She died in the same year and it is said her ghost haunts the greenroom.

The updated trust deed of the North Shore Theatre and Arts Trust, as filed in December 2018, states that the objectives of the trust include:

(a) to promote the preservation, protection and development of The PumpHouse on Lake Pupuke

(b) to use The PumpHouse as a centre to encourage and promote the arts for the interest and participation of the North Shore general public

(c) to promote and encourage the arts including all forms of theatre arts, music, drama, poetry and the visual arts, applied arts, crafts, the art of film and ballet and the study of the arts with the assistance of the Friends of the PumpHouse ...

The PumpHouse has three main areas available for events:

- a theatre-style auditorium seating 190
- an outdoor amphitheatre seating 200
- a studio space seating 50

In 2017, the main auditorium was renamed the Genevieve Becroft Auditorium. This was to recognise the contribution of Genevieve Becroft towards saving the historic pumphouse building, and her role as patron of the arts.
