= List of awards and nominations received by Howard Shore =

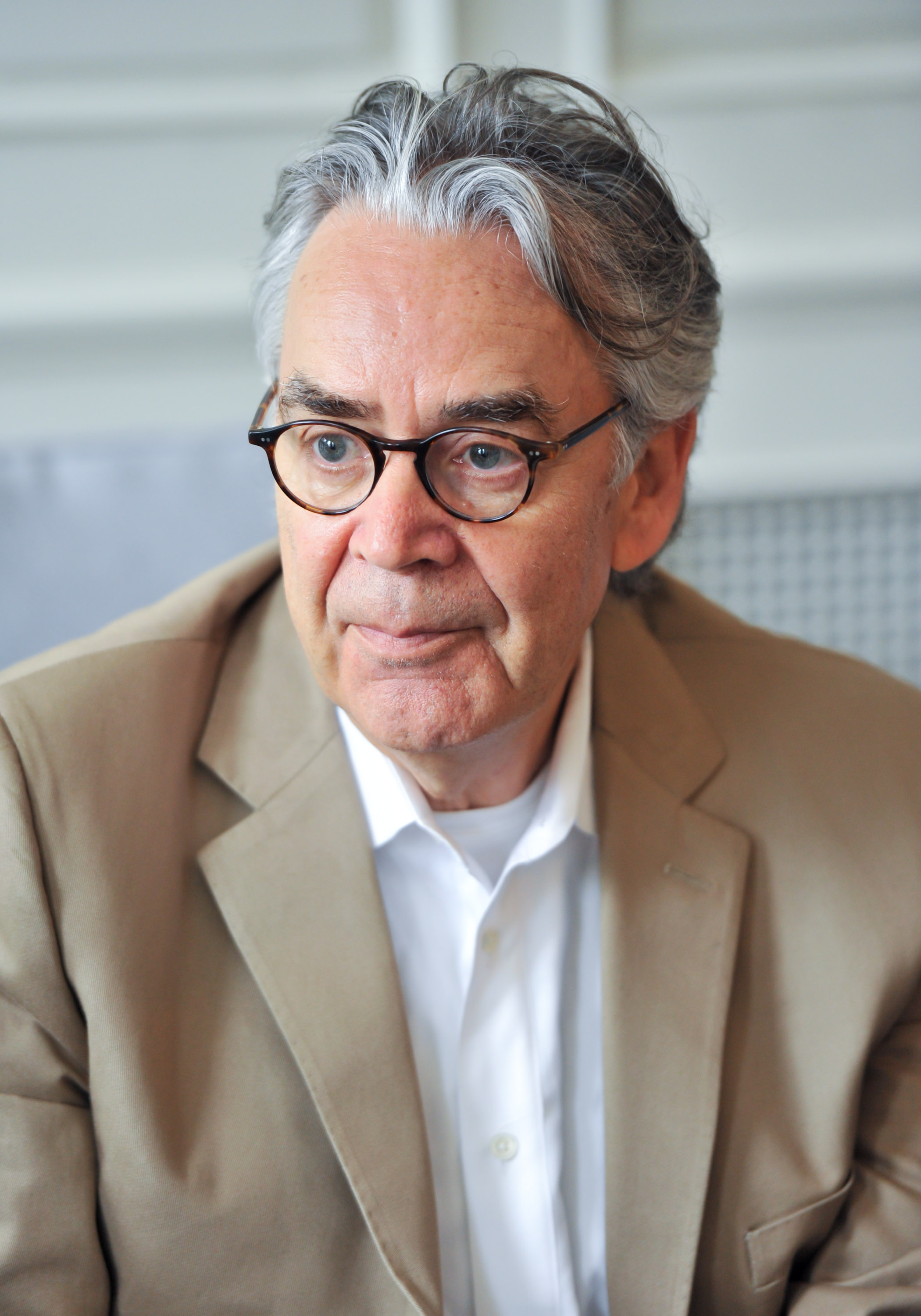
Howard Shore

This article is a list of awards and nominations received by Howard Shore.

Howard Shore is a Canadian composer. Over the course of his career he has received numerous accolades including three Academy Awards, three Critics' Choice Awards, three Golden Globe Awards and four Grammy Awards as well as nominations for six BAFTA Awards, and a Emmy Award.

== Major Awards ==
=== Academy Awards ===
Year	Category	Nominated work	Result	Ref.
2001	Best Original Score	The Lord of the Rings: The Fellowship of the Ring	Won	
2003	Best Original Score	The Lord of the Rings: The Return of the King	Won	
2003	Best Original Song	"Into the West", (from The Lord of the Rings: The Return of the King) (Note: (shared with Fran Walsh and Annie Lennox))	Won	
2011	Best Original Score	Hugo	Nominated	

=== BAFTA Awards ===
Year	Category	Nominated work	Result	Ref.
British Academy Film Awards
1991	Best Original Music	The Silence of the Lambs	Nominated	
2001	Best Original Music	The Lord of the Rings: The Fellowship of the Ring	Nominated	
2002	Best Original Music	Gangs of New York	Nominated	
2003	Best Original Music	The Lord of the Rings: The Return of the King	Nominated	
2004	Best Original Music	The Aviator	Nominated	
2011	Best Original Music	Hugo	Nominated	

=== Critics' Choice Awards ===
Year	Category	Nominated work	Result	Ref.
Critics' Choice Movie Awards
2001	Best Composer	The Lord of the Rings: The Fellowship of the Ring	Won	
2002	Best Composer	The Lord of the Rings: The Two Towers	Nominated	
2002	Best Composer	The Lord of the Rings: The Return of the King	Won	
2004	Best Composer	The Aviator	Won	
2006	Best Composer	The Departed	Nominated	
2011	Best Score	Hugo	Nominated	
2015	Best Score	Spotlight	Nominated	

=== Emmy Awards ===
Year	Category	Nominated work	Result	Ref.
Primetime Emmy Awards
2023	Outstanding Original Main Title Theme Music	The Lord of the Rings: The Rings of Power	Nominated	

=== Golden Globe Awards ===
Year	Category	Nominated work	Result	Ref.
2001	Best Original Score	The Lord of the Rings: The Fellowship of the Ring	Nominated	
2003	Best Original Score	The Lord of the Rings: The Return of the King	Won	
2003	Best Original Song	"Into the West", (from The Lord of the Rings: The Return of the King) (Note: (shared with Fran Walsh and Annie Lennox))	Won	
2004	Best Original Score	The Aviator	Won	
2007	Best Original Score	Eastern Promises	Nominated	
2011	Best Original Score	Hugo	Nominated	

=== Grammy Awards ===
Year	Category	Nominated work	Result	Ref.
1995	Best Score Soundtrack for Visual Media	"Main Title" (from Ed Wood)	Nominated	
2002	Best Score Soundtrack for Visual Media	The Lord of the Rings: The Fellowship of the Ring	Won	
2003	Best Score Soundtrack for Visual Media	The Lord of the Rings: The Two Towers	Won	
2004	Best Score Soundtrack for Visual Media	The Lord of the Rings: The Return of the King	Won	
2004	Best Song Written for Visual Media	"Into the West", (from The Lord of the Rings: The Return of the King) (Note: (shared with Fran Walsh and Annie Lennox))	Won	
2005	Best Score Soundtrack Album for Visual Media	The Aviator: Music from the Motion Picture	Nominated	
2007	Best Score Soundtrack Album for Visual Media	The Departed: Original Score	Nominated	
2012	Best Score Soundtrack for Visual Media	Hugo (Original Score)	Nominated	

== Miscellaneous awards ==
Organizations	Year	Category	Work	Result	Ref.
American Film Institute Awards	2001	Composer of the Year	The Lord of the Rings: The Fellowship of the Ring	Nominated	
ASCAP Film & Television Music Awards	2004	ASCAP Henry Mancini Award	—	Won	
Cannes Film Festival	2014	Cannes Soundtrack Award	Maps to the Stars	Won	
Central Ohio Film Critics Association	2003	Best Score	The Lord of the Rings: The Return of the King	Nominated	
Central Ohio Film Critics Association	2011	Best Score	Hugo	Nominated	
Central Ohio Film Critics Association	2012	Best Score	The Hobbit: An Unexpected Journey	Nominated	
Chicago Film Critics Association	1996	Best Original Score	That Thing You Do!	Nominated	
Chicago Film Critics Association	2001	Best Original Score	The Lord of the Rings: The Fellowship of the Ring	Won	
Chicago Film Critics Association	2002	Best Original Score	The Lord of the Rings: The Two Towers	Nominated	
Chicago Film Critics Association	2003	Best Original Score	The Lord of the Rings: The Return of the King	Won	
Chicago Film Critics Association	2004	Best Original Score	The Aviator	Won	
Chicago Film Critics Association	2011	Best Original Score	Hugo	Nominated	
Denver Film Critics Society	2013	Best Original Score	The Hobbit: The Desolation of Smaug	Nominated	
Denver Film Critics Society	2015	Best Original Score	Spotlight	Nominated	
Film Fest Ghent	2002	Georges Delerue Award	Spider	Won	
Gotham Awards	1994	Below-the-Line Award	—	Won	
Hollywood Music in Media Awards	2012	Best Original Score – Feature Film	The Hobbit: An Unexpected Journey	Nominated	
Hollywood Music in Media Awards	2013	Best Original Score – Sci-Fi/Fantasy	The Hobbit: The Desolation of Smaug	Won	
Indiana Film Journalists Association	2011	Best Musical Score	Hugo	Runner-up	
International Cinephile Society	2003	Best Original Score	The Lord of the Rings: The Return of the King	Won	
International Cinephile Society	2022	Best Original Score	Crimes of the Future	Nominated	
International Film Music Critics Association	2000	Film Composer of the Year	—	Nominated	
International Film Music Critics Association	2004	Film Score of the Year	The Aviator	Nominated	
International Film Music Critics Association	2004	Best Original Score for a Drama Film	The Aviator	Won	
International Film Music Critics Association	2005	Best Original Score for a Horror/Thriller Film	A History of Violence	Won	
International Film Music Critics Association	2005	Best New Release/Re-Release/Re-Recording of an Existing Score	The Lord of the Rings: The Fellowship of the Ring	Won	
International Film Music Critics Association	2006	Best Original Score for a Drama Film	The Departed	Nominated	
International Film Music Critics Association	2007	Best Original Score for a Drama Film	Eastern Promises	Nominated	
International Film Music Critics Association	2007	Best New Release/Re-Release/Re-Recording of an Existing Score	The Lord of the Rings: The Return of the King	Nominated	
International Film Music Critics Association	2009	Best Film Music Compilation Album or Box Set	Howard Shore: Collector's Edition Vol. 1	Nominated	
International Film Music Critics Association	2011	Film Score of the Year	Hugo	Nominated	
International Film Music Critics Association	2011	Best Original Score for a Fantasy/Science Fiction/Horror Film	Hugo	Nominated	
International Film Music Critics Association	2011	Best Archival Re-Recording of an Existing Score	The Lord of the Rings Symphony	Nominated	
International Film Music Critics Association	2012	Film Score of the Year	The Hobbit: An Unexpected Journey	Nominated	
International Film Music Critics Association	2012	Best Original Score for a Fantasy/Science Fiction/Horror Film	The Hobbit: An Unexpected Journey	Nominated	
International Film Music Critics Association	2013	Film Score of the Year	The Hobbit: The Desolation of Smaug	Nominated	
International Film Music Critics Association	2013	Best Original Score for a Fantasy/Science Fiction/Horror Film	The Hobbit: The Desolation of Smaug	Nominated	
International Film Music Critics Association	2013	Film Music Composition of the Year	"Beyond the Forest" (from The Hobbit: The Desolation of Smaug)	Nominated	
International Film Music Critics Association	2014	Best Original Score for a Fantasy/Science Fiction/Horror Film	The Hobbit: The Battle of the Five Armies	Nominated	
International Film Music Critics Association	2022	Score of the Year	The Lord of the Rings: The Rings of Power	Won	
International Film Music Critics Association	2022	Best Original Score for Television	The Lord of the Rings: The Rings of Power	Won	
International Film Music Critics Association	2022	Best Original Score for a Fantasy/Science Fiction Film	Crimes of the Future	Nominated	
Krakow Film Music Festival	2017	Kilar Award	—	Won	
Las Vegas Film Critics Society	2001	Best Score	The Lord of the Rings: The Fellowship of the Ring	Won	
Las Vegas Film Critics Society	2003	Best Score	The Lord of the Rings: The Return of the King	Won	
Locarno International Film Festival	2016	Vision Award	—	Won	
Los Angeles Film Critics Association	1991	Best Music Score	Naked Lunch and The Silence of the Lambs	Runner-up	
Los Angeles Film Critics Association	1994	Best Music Score	Ed Wood	Won	
Los Angeles Film Critics Association	1995	Best Music Score	Seven	Runner-up	
Los Angeles Film Critics Association	2001	Best Music Score	The Lord of the Rings: The Fellowship of the Ring	Won	
National Board of Review Awards	2005	Career Achievement in Music Composition	—	Won	
Online Film & Television Association	2001	Best Original Score	The Lord of the Rings: The Fellowship of the Ring	Won	
Online Film & Television Association	2002	Best Original Score	The Lord of the Rings: The Two Towers	Nominated	
Online Film & Television Association	2002	Best Original Song	"Gollum's Song" (from The Lord of the Rings: The Two Towers)	Nominated	
Online Film & Television Association	2003	Best Original Score	The Lord of the Rings: The Return of the King	Won	
Online Film & Television Association	2003	Best Original Song	"Into the West" (from The Lord of the Rings: The Return of the King)	Won	
Online Film & Television Association	2004	Best Original Score	The Aviator	Nominated	
Online Film & Television Association	2006	Best Original Score	The Departed	Nominated	
Online Film & Television Association	2011	Best Original Score	Hugo	Nominated	
Online Film & Television Association	2021	Film Hall of Fame: Scores	The Lord of the Rings: The Fellowship of the Ring	Inducted	
Online Film Critics Society	2001	Best Original Score	The Lord of the Rings: The Fellowship of the Ring	Nominated	
Online Film Critics Society	2002	Best Original Score	The Lord of the Rings: The Two Towers	Nominated	
Online Film Critics Society	2003	Best Original Score	The Lord of the Rings: The Return of the King	Won	
Online Film Critics Society	2004	Best Original Score	The Aviator	Nominated	
Palm Springs International Film Festival	2005	Frederick Loewe Award for Film Composing	—	Won	
Palm Springs International Film Festival	2012	Frederick Loewe Award for Film Composing	—	Won	
Phoenix Film Critics Society	2001	Best Original Score	The Lord of the Rings: The Fellowship of the Ring	Won	
Phoenix Film Critics Society	2002	Best Original Score	The Lord of the Rings: The Two Towers	Nominated	
Phoenix Film Critics Society	2002	Best Original Song	"Gollum's Song" (shared with Fran Walsh) (from The Lord of the Rings: The Two Towers)	Won	
Phoenix Film Critics Society	2003	Best Original Score	The Lord of the Rings: The Return of the King	Won	
Phoenix Film Critics Society	2013	Best Original Score	The Hobbit: The Desolation of Smaug	Nominated	
Phoenix Film Critics Society	2015	Best Original Score	Spotlight	Nominated	
San Diego Film Critics Society	2011	Best Score	Hugo	Nominated	
Satellite Awards	2003	Best Original Score	The Lord of the Rings: The Return of the King	Nominated	
Satellite Awards	2004	Best Original Score	The Aviator	Nominated	
Satellite Awards	2007	Best Original Score	Eastern Promises	Nominated	
Satellite Awards	2010	Best Original Song	"Eclipse" (All Yours)" (from The Twilight Saga: Eclipse) (shared with Emily Haines and James Shaw)	Nominated	
Satellite Awards	2015	Best Original Score	Spotlight	Nominated	
Saturn Awards	1986	Best Music	The Fly	Nominated	
Saturn Awards	1988	Best Music	Dead Ringers	Nominated	
Saturn Awards	1991	Best Music	The Silence of the Lambs	Nominated	
Saturn Awards	1994	Best Music	Ed Wood	Won	
Saturn Awards	1995	Best Music	Seven	Nominated	
Saturn Awards	2001	Best Music	The Lord of the Rings: The Fellowship of the Ring	Nominated	
Saturn Awards	2002	Best Music	The Lord of the Rings: The Two Towers	Nominated	
Saturn Awards	2003	Best Music	The Lord of the Rings: The Return of the King	Won	
Saturn Awards	2011	Best Music	Hugo	Nominated	
Saturn Awards	2012	Best Music	The Hobbit: An Unexpected Journey	Nominated	
Saturn Awards	2013	Best Music	The Hobbit: The Desolation of Smaug	Nominated	
Saturn Awards	2014	Best Music	The Hobbit: The Battle of the Five Armies	Nominated	
Saturn Awards	2022	Best Music	Crimes of the Future	Nominated	
Seattle Film Critics Awards	2004	Best Music	The Aviator	Won	
Society of Composers & Lyricists	2019	Outstanding Original Score for an Independent Film	The Song of Names	Nominated	
St. Louis Film Critics Association	2013	Best Original Score	The Hobbit: The Desolation of Smaug	Nominated	
Washington D.C. Area Film Critics Association	2011	Best Original Score	Hugo	Nominated	
Washington D.C. Area Film Critics Association	2012	Best Original Score	The Hobbit: An Unexpected Journey	Nominated	
World Soundtrack Awards	2002	Soundtrack Composer of the Year	The Lord of the Rings: The Fellowship of the Ring	Nominated	
World Soundtrack Awards	2002	Best Original Soundtrack of the Year	The Lord of the Rings: The Fellowship of the Ring	Won	
World Soundtrack Awards	2002	Public Choice Award	The Lord of the Rings: The Fellowship of the Ring	Won	
World Soundtrack Awards	2003	Soundtrack Composer of the Year	Gangs of New York	Nominated	
World Soundtrack Awards	2003	Best Original Soundtrack of the Year	Gangs of New York	Nominated	
World Soundtrack Awards	2003	Best Original Song Written for a Film	"Gollum's Song" (shared with Fran Walsh, Janet Roddick, David Donaldson, Steve Roche, David Long, and Emiliana Torrini) (from The Lord of the Rings: The Two Towers)	Nominated	
World Soundtrack Awards	2004	Best Original Song Written for a Film	"Into the West" (shared with Fran Walsh and Annie Lennox) (from The Lord of the Rings: The Return of the King)	Nominated	
World Soundtrack Awards	2005	Soundtrack Composer of the Year	The Aviator	Nominated	
World Soundtrack Awards	2005	Best Original Soundtrack of the Year	The Aviator	Nominated	
World Soundtrack Awards	2012	Soundtrack Composer of the Year	Hugo	Nominated	
World Soundtrack Awards	2012	Best Original Soundtrack of the Year	A Dangerous Method, Cosmopolis, and Hugo	Nominated	
World Soundtrack Awards	2013	Best Original Soundtrack of the Year	The Hobbit: An Unexpected Journey	Nominated	
World Soundtrack Awards	2014	Public Choice Award	The Hobbit: The Desolation of Smaug	Nominated	
