= 2005 New Zealand Screen Awards =

- Awarded for: Excellence in New Zealand film and television
- Date: 27 July 2005
- Location: SkyCity Theatre, Auckland
- Country: New Zealand
- Presented by: Screen Directors Guild of New Zealand
- First award: 2005
- Final award: 2007

The inaugural New Zealand Screen Awards were held on Wednesday 27 July 2005 at SkyCity Theatre in Auckland, New Zealand. Following the demise of the GOFTA awards, the Screen Directors Guild of New Zealand founded the New Zealand Screen Awards to honour excellence in New Zealand film and television. Due to there having been no film awards in 2004, the eligibility period was from 1 October 2003 to July 2005. In the weeks ahead of the awards presentation, sponsor SkyCity screened a series of nominated short films. The film In My Father's Den was nominated in all 12 of the feature film award categories and won 10 awards.

== Nominees and winners ==
No finalists were selected for the Feature Film categories Achievement in Production Design, Achievement in Make-Up, Achievement in Special Effects/CGI due to lack of entries.

There were 12 feature film categories, two digital feature categories, four short film categories and 22 television categories.

=== Feature film ===
Best Picture

- In My Father's Den, Trevor Haysom, Dixie Linder (T.H.E Film, Little Bird)
  - Fracture, Charlie McClellan (Savuti Films)
  - Perfect Strangers, Robin Laing, Gaylene Preston, Jay Cassells (Gaylene Preston Productions, Huntaway Productions)

Achievement in Directing

- Brad McGann, In My Father's Den
  - Larry Parr, 'Fracture'
  - Gaylene Preston, 'Perfect Strangers'

Performance by an Actor in a Leading Role

- Matthew Macfadyen, In My Father's Den
  - Sam Neill, Perfect Strangers
  - Andrew Paterson, 50 Ways of Saying Fabulous (MF Films)

Performance by an Actress in a Leading Role

- Emily Barclay, In My Father's Den
  - Rachael Blake, Perfect Strangers
  - Kate Elliott, Fracture

Performance by an Actor in a Supporting Role

- Colin Moy, In My Father's Den
  - Paul Glover, Fracture
  - Joel Tobeck, Perfect Strangers

Performance by an Actress in a Supporting Role

- Jodie Rimmer, In My Father's Den
  - Liddy Holloway, Fracture
  - Jennifer Ward-Lealand, Fracture

Screenplay

- Brad McGann, In My Father's Den
  - Gaylene Preston, Perfect Strangers

Achievement in Cinematography

- Stuart Dryburgh, In My Father's Den
  - Alun Bollinger, Perfect Strangers
  - Fred Renata, Fracture

Achievement in Editing

- Chris Plummer, In My Father's Den
  - John Gilbert A.C.E, Perfect Strangers
  - Jonathan Woodford-Robinson, Fracture

Achievement in Original Music

- Victoria Kelly, Fracture
  - Simon Boswell, In My Father's Den
  - Plan 9: David Donaldson, Janet Roddick, Steve Roche, Perfect Strangers

Contribution to a Soundtrack

- Richard Flynn, Chris Burt, Gethin Creagh, In My Father's Den
  - Tim Prebble, Gethin Creagh, Chris Todd, Fracture
  - Ken Saville, Tim Prebble, Mike Hedges, Perfect Strangers

Achievement in Costume Design

- Amanda Neale, Fracture
  - Helen Bollinger, Perfect Strangers
  - Kirsty Cameron, In My Father's Den*

=== Digital feature ===
Best Digital Feature

- Kaikohe Demolition, Florian Habicht (Pictures for Anna)
  - 1 Nite, Amarbir Singh, (Indipact Films)

Technical Contribution to a Digital Feature

- Cristobal Araus Lobos, 1 Nite
  - Christopher Pryor, Kaikohe Demolition
  - John Crisstoffels, Offensive Behaviour (Environmentally Hazardous Films)

=== Short film ===
Best Short Film

- Closer, David Rittey (AJ Films)
  - My Father's Shoes, Samantha Scott (West Coast Film Club)
  - No Ordinary Sun, Jonathan Brough (Thin Film)

Performance in a Short Film

- Toby Agnew, Closer
  - Norissa Taia, The Little Things (Blueskin Films)
  - Frank Whitten, My Father's Shoes

Script for a Short Film

- Zia Mandviwalla, Eating Sausage (Comotion Pictures)
  - Jonathan Brough, No Ordinary Sun
  - Jochen Fitzherbert, Rest Stop (Killing Time Productions)

Technical Contribution to a Short Film

- Ashley Turner, No Ordinary Sun
  - James Cowley, Cockle (Exile Films)
  - Simon Reira, No Ordinary Sun

=== Television ===
Best Drama Series

- The Insider's Guide To Happiness, Dave Gibson, Donna Malane, Jan Haynes (The Gibson Group)
  - Good Hands/Lima Lelei, Paul Simei-Barton, Justine Simei-Barton (Tala Pasifika Productions)
  - Mercy Peak, John Laing, (South Pacific Pictures)

Best Comedy Programme

- bro'Town, Elizabeth Mitchell (Firehorse Films)
  - Moon TV, Leigh Hart (Moon Enterprises)
  - Serial Killers – "Big Hairy Balls", Judith Trye (Landtry)

Best Documentary

- Murder on the Blade?, Keith Hunter (Hunter Productions)
  - Haunting Douglas, Shona McCullagh, Leanne Pooley (Spacific Films)
  - Reluctant Revolutionary, Tom Scott, Danny Mulheron (Direct Hit Productions)

Best Documentary/Factual Series

- Intrepid Journeys, Melanie Rakena, Jane Andrews (Jam TV)
  - He Whare Korero, Tainui Stephens, Wiha Te Raki Hawea (Pito One Productions)
  - Mercury Lane, Series II, Philippa Mossman (Greenstone Pictures)

Korero Maori Best Maori Language Programme

- Hawaiki "Nga Waka", Tukoroirangi Morgan (Astraeus NZ)
  - Pukana, Matai Smith, Reikura Morgan (Cinco Cine Film Productions)

Best Children's Programme

- Being Eve, Vanessa Alexander, Anne Williams (South Pacific Pictures)
  - Koi, Chris Winitana (Awekura Productions)
  - The Dress Up Box 3 – Jigsaw, Sue Wolfenden (Papageno Productions)

Best Lifestyle/Entertainment Programme

- The Living Room, Series II, Mark Albiston, Amelia Bardsley (Sticky Pictures)
  - Korero Time 2004 – Juniors, Lanita Ririnui-Ryan (Front of the Box Productions)
  - NZ Goes to Chelsea, Karen Mackenzie, Maggie Barry (Karen Mackenzie)

Performance by an Actress

- Robyn Malcolm, Serial Killers – I am the Resurrection
  - Sophia Hawthorne, The Insider's Guide To Happiness
  - Sara Wiseman, Mercy Peak

Performance by a Supporting Actress

- Denise O'Connell, The Insider's Guide To Happiness
  - Fiona Truelove, Good Hands/Lima Lelei
  - Tandi Wright, Serial Killers "Control/Alt/Delete"

Performance by an Actor

- Will Hall, The Insider's Guide To Happiness
  - Ben Barrington, The Insider's Guide To Happiness
  - John Leigh, Serial Killers "Big Hairy Balls"

Performance by a Supporting Actor

- Jason Whyte, The Insider's Guide To Happiness
  - Tim Balme, Mercy Peak
  - Dean O'Gorman, Killers "Product Placement"

Presenter, Entertainment/Factual

- Peter Elliott, Explorers (TVNZ)
  - Oliver Driver, Frontseat (The Gibson Group)
  - Tom Scott, Reluctant Revolutionary

Script, Single Episode of a Drama Series or Serial

- David Brechin-Smith, The Insider's Guide To Happiness – Ep 6
  - Paula Boock, Peter Cox, The Insider's Guide To Happiness – Ep 1
  - James Griffin, Mercy Peak – Ep 55

Script, Comedy

- Oscar Kightley, Mario Gaoa, David Fane, Shimpal Lelisi, bro'Town – The Weakest Link/Ep 6
  - David Brechin-Smith, The Strip Series II, Ep 16 (The Gibson Group)
  - James Griffin, Serial Killers – "Big Hairy Balls"/Ep 3

Achievement in Directing, Drama/Comedy Programme

- Mark Beesley, The Insider's Guide To Happiness – Ep 6
  - Elizabeth Mitchell, Maka Makatoa, bro'Town – The Weakest Link/Ep 6
  - Mike Smith, Serial Killers "Big Hairy Balls"/Ep 3

Achievement in Directing, Documentary

- Leanne Pooley, Haunting Douglas (Spacific Films)
  - Andrew Bancroft, Mercury Lane, Series II
  - Paul Swadel, Colin McCahon: I Am (Screentime)

Achievement in Directing, Factual Programming/Entertainment

- Mark Albiston, The Living Room, Series II
  - Te Arepa Kahi, Hawaiki "Maui"
  - Jerome Joseph Cvitanovich, Country Calendar – Oamaru Stone (TVNZ)

Achievement in Camerawork Documentary

- Peter Young, Explorers (TVNZ)
  - Grant Atkinson, Mothers Behind Bars (RSVP Productions)
  - David Paul, Long Lost Sons (The Gibson Group)

Achievement in Editing, Documentary

- Tim Woodhouse, Haunting Douglas
  - Gaylene Barnes, Out of Sight: Out of Mind (Frank Film)
  - John Fraser, Give it a Whirl (Visionary Film & TV)

Achievement in Original Music

- David Long, The Insider's Guide To Happiness – Ep 6
  - Victoria Kelly, Joost Langveld, Being Eve
  - Tom McLeod, Secret Agent Men, Series II – "Days of Chunder" (Greenstone Pictures)

Contribution to a Soundtrack

- Carl Smith, Travis Hefferen, Being Eve
  - Steve Finnigan, Rodney Larsen, Tom Miskin, Mercy Peak – The Book That I Read (Sound Post)
  - Richard Sweeting, Roger Green, Explorers

Contribution to Design

- Euan Frizzell, From Len Lye to Gollum (Colbalt VFX)
  - Zane Holmes, Andrew Shanks, Alistair Crawford, Being Eve
  - Nic Smillie, The Insider's Guide To Happiness – Ep 3
