= They Shall Not Grow Old =

2018 documentary film

- Theatrical release poster
- Directed by: Peter Jackson
- Produced by: Clare Olssen; Peter Jackson
- Edited by: Jabez Olssen
- Music by: Plan 9
- Production companies: 14–18 NOW; Imperial War Museum; WingNut Films; House Productions; BBC Films; New Zealand Film Commission
- Distributed by: Warner Bros. Pictures
- Release dates: 16 October 2018 (London Film Festival); 9 November 2018 (United Kingdom)
- Running time: 99 minutes (theatrical cut); 129 minutes (extended cut)
- Countries: New Zealand; United Kingdom
- Language: English
- Box office: $21.6 million

They Shall Not Grow Old is a 2018 documentary film directed and produced by Peter Jackson. It was created using footage of the First World War held by the British Imperial War Museum (IWM), most of which was previously unseen, and all of which was over 100 years old by the time of the film's release. Much of the footage was colourised and restored using modern production techniques for its use in the film, and sound effects and voice acting were added to the silent footage. The film's narration was edited from interviews with British WWI veterans from the collections of the BBC and the IWM.

Jackson dedicated the film—his first documentary as director—to his grandfather, who fought in WWI. He said his intention was for the film to be an immersive experience of "what it was like to be a soldier", rather than a story or recounting of events. The crew reviewed 100 hours of archival film footage and 600 hours of interviews with 200 WWI veterans to find the materials from which to construct the film. The film's title was inspired by a line ("They shall grow not old, as we that are left grow old") from Laurence Binyon's 1914 poem "For the Fallen", famous for being used in the "Ode of Remembrance".

The film premiered simultaneously at the BFI London Film Festival and in selected cinemas in the UK on 16 October 2018, before airing on BBC Two on 11 November, the hundredth anniversary of the Armistice of 11 November 1918. In the US, following the success of screenings of the film by Fathom Events on 17 and 27 December, Warner Bros. Pictures gave the film a wide theatrical release in February 2019. Critics acclaimed the film for its restoration work, immersive atmosphere, and portrayal of war.

== Production ==
14–18 NOW and the Imperial War Museum (IWM) co-commissioned the film, in association with the BBC, approaching Jackson about the project in 2015. According to Jackson, to make the film, he and his crew reviewed 600 hours of interviews from the BBC and IWM, and 100 hours of original film footage from the IWM. The interviews came from 200 veterans, with the audio from 120 of them being used in the film.

"This is not a story of the First World War, it is not a historical story, it may not even be entirely accurate but it's the memories of the men who fought – they're just giving their impressions of what it was like to be a soldier."

— Peter Jackson at the film's premiere

After reviewing the footage, Jackson decided the film would not feature traditional narration, and would instead only feature audio excerpts of the soldiers talking about their war memories, in order to make the film about the soldiers themselves. For the same reason, few dates or locations are identified in the finished film. Jackson stated:

"We made a decision not to identify the soldiers as the film happened. There were so many of them that names would be popping up on the screen every time a voice appeared. In a way it became an anonymous and agnostic film. We also edited out any references to dates and places, because I didn’t want the movie to be about this day here or that day there. There's hundreds of books about all that stuff. I wanted the film to be a human experience and be agnostic in that way. [...] I didn't want individual stories about individuals. I wanted it to be what it ended up being: 120 men telling a single story. Which is: what was it like to be a British soldier on the western front?"

About the decision to colourise footage for the film, Jackson said: "[The men] saw a war in colour, they certainly didn't see it in black and white. I wanted to reach through the fog of time and pull these men into the modern world, so they can regain their humanity once more – rather than be seen only as Charlie Chaplin–type figures in the vintage archive film."

Jackson did not receive any payment for the making of the film, and his crew visually restored—without charge—all 100 hours of footage that the IWM sent them, "just to get their archive in better shape". Jackson's paternal grandfather, Sgt. William Jackson (to whom the film is dedicated), was British and fought in the First World War, and Jackson grew up hearing stories about William's experiences in the war from his father. According to Jackson, making the film gave him "a greater understanding of what my grandfather would have gone through".

The film was produced by Jackson's WingNut Films, with House Productions serving as executive producers, and supported by 14–18 NOW, which was funded by the UK's National Lottery Heritage Fund, Arts Council England, and the Department for Digital, Culture, Media and Sport, along with other public and private funding, including corporate supporters.

== Music ==
The film's music was composed by Plan 9, a New Zealand trio consisting of David Donaldson, Steve Roche, and Janet Roddick.

The closing credits of the film feature an extended rendition of "Mademoiselle from Armentières", a song that was particularly popular during WWI. Jackson did not decide to use the song until late in production, so there was only a short time to assemble the performers to record it. As he was in New Zealand, but did not want to have locals sing the song in British accents, a group of British men in service to the UK government were recruited from the British High Commission in New Zealand to perform the song.

== Release ==
They Shall Not Grow Old premiered on 16 October 2018 as a Special Presentation at the BFI London Film Festival, with Prince William, Duke of Cambridge, in attendance. It was simultaneously released in selected cinemas across the UK, and copies of the film were also sent to UK schools on the same day. The simulcast, with some screenings in 2D and some in 3D, featured a special post-screening Q&A with Jackson hosted by film critic Mark Kermode.

The film was broadcast on BBC Two on 11 November 2018, the one-hundredth anniversary of the Armistice of 11 November 1918. To accompany the film, a special episode of the documentary series What Do Artists Do All Day?, which followed Peter Jackson making the film, aired the following day on BBC Four.

In the US, Fathom Events arranged special screenings of the film on 17 and 27 December 2018, in both 2D and 3D, and Warner Bros. Pictures released it in New York, Los Angeles, and Washington, DC, on 11 January 2019, with plans to expand to 25 markets on 1 February. Because it missed the 1 October 2018 filing deadline, the film was deemed ineligible for consideration for the Academy Award for Best Documentary Feature at the 91st Academy Awards, and, because it was a 2018 film, it was ineligible for the award the following year.

== Reception ==
=== Box office ===
The film grossed $18 million in the United States and Canada and $3.7 million in other territories, for a total worldwide gross of $21.6 million.

Fathom Events' one-day presentation of the film in the US on 17 December 2018 grossed $2.3 million, setting a company record for a documentary showing. The two encore showings of the film in 1,122 cinemas on 27 December grossed $3.4 million, the highest-grossing single-day total for a documentary screened by Fathom, and one of the top-grossing single-day presentations of any kind by the company. On Martin Luther King Jr. Day, the film grossed an additional $2.6 million from screenings in 1,335 cinemas. After Warner Bros. gave the film a general release in 735 cinemas on 1 February 2019, it earned $2.4 million its debut weekend, finishing 10th at the box office.

=== Critical response ===
On the review aggregator website Rotten Tomatoes, 99% of 157 critics' reviews of the film are positive, with an average score of 8.7/10; the site's "critics consensus" reads: "An impressive technical achievement with a walloping emotional impact, They Shall Not Grow Old pays brilliant cinematic tribute to the sacrifice of a generation." On Metacritic, the film has a weighted average score of 91 out of 100 based on reviews from 26 critics, indicating "universal acclaim", and it is labeled as a "Metacritic must-see".

In a five-star review for The Guardian, Peter Bradshaw called the film "a visually staggering thought experiment", and wrote: "The effect is electrifying. The soldiers are returned to an eerie, hyperreal kind of life in front of our eyes, like ghosts or figures summoned up in a seance. The faces are unforgettable. [...] The details are harrowing, as is the political incorrectness of what the soldiers recall: some express their candid enjoyment of the war, others their utter desensitisation to what they experienced."

Guy Lode of Variety called the film "a technical dazzler with a surprisingly humane streak", stating: "if They Shall Not Grow Old is head-spinning for its jolting animation of creakily shot battle scenes—tricked out with ingeniously integrated sound editing and seamlessly re-timed from 13 frames a second to 24—its greatest revelation isn't one of sound and fury. Rather, it's the film's faces that stick longest in the mind. Through the exhaustive transformation completed by Jackson's team, visages that were all but indistinguishably blurred in the archives take on shape, character and creases of worry, terror and occasional hilarity. In conjunction with the film's intricately stitched narration, its soldiers turn from cold statistics to warm, quivering human beings, drawing us with renewed empathy into a Great War that, they all but unanimously agree, had precious little greatness to it."

Stephen Dalton of The Hollywood Reporter said the film "suggests new cinematic methods of rescuing history from history books, humanizing and dramatizing true stories with a modest injection of movie-world artifice. Some critics may object to how Jackson streamlines and elides real events, stripping away specifics while offering no broader socio-political comment on the war. But as an immersive primer on the first-hand experiences of British soldiers, this innovative documentary is a haunting, moving and consistently engaging lesson in how to bring the past vividly alive."

Mike McCahill of IndieWire gave the film a B grade, writing that "the filmmaker's extensive restoration project doesn't always provide new insights, but it succeeds at creating a fresh look at the horrors of WWI."

The response to the film was not universally positive, however, and some concerns were raised, particularly among archivists and film historians, about the ways in which it erased the original filmmakers, manipulated the image through colourisation and other techniques, and implied that the original footage, much of which had been extensively restored by the IWM archives, was in disrepair.

Others have questioned the authenticity of the soundtrack, which was constructed from lip reading and oral history archives and has been given less critical attention than the colourisation techniques. Historians have argued that, while lip reading may reveal the words that were spoken, it does not necessarily represent regional accents or changes in pronunciation over the century between when the images were captured and the film was made.

=== Accolades ===
The film was nominated for the BAFTA Award for Best Documentary at the 72nd British Academy Film Awards, but lost to Free Solo, which also won that years' Academy Award for Best Documentary Feature.

== See also ==
- World War II in HD Colour, a 2008 TV series comprising colourised footage of the Second World War
