= The Hobbit: An Unexpected Journey (soundtrack) =

Soundtrack album by Howard Shore
- Released: 12 December 2012
- Recorded: 2012
- Studios: Abbey Road Studios, London; AIR Lyndhrust Studios, London
- Length: 108:49 (standard); 127:03 (special edition)
- Labels: WaterTower; Decca
- Producers: Howard Shore; Peter Jackson; Fran Walsh; Philippa Boyens

Singles from The Hobbit: An Unexpected Journey
- 1. "Song of the Lonely Mountain" Released: 2012

Special Edition cover

The Hobbit: An Unexpected Journey: Original Motion Picture Soundtrack is the soundtrack to the 2012 film The Hobbit: An Unexpected Journey directed by Peter Jackson, which is the first instalment in The Hobbit trilogy, acting as a prequel to Jackson's The Lord of the Rings trilogy. Released through Decca Records on 12 December 2012, the album featured instrumental music composed by Howard Shore and performed by the London Philharmonic Orchestra, London Voices and Tiffin' boy choir. The album was issued in two-discs, with both standard and special edition formats.

== Background and release ==
As with the music for The Lord of the Rings film series, the score for The Hobbit trilogy was developed using leitmotifs and themes for individual characters. Recording for An Unexpected Journey was held at the Abbey Road Studios and Air Lyndhurst in London. It was performed by the London Philharmonic Orchestra, London Voices and Tiffin' boy choir, with the soprano Clara Sanabras. Richard Armitage, performed the song "Misty Mountains" composed by David Donaldson, David Long, Steve Roche and Janet Roddick, while Neil Finn wrote and performed "Song of the Lonely Mountain", which was featured in the end credits.

The soundtrack album for An Unexpected Journey was released on 11 December 2012 through WaterTower Music and Decca Records. The album accompanied both standard and special edition, both combined in a two-disc format and contained two hours of music.

== Critical reception ==
Professional ratings
Review scores
Source	Rating
AllMusic	3.5/5 stars
Examiner.com	A+
Filmtracks.com	5/5 stars
Movie Music UK	4/5 stars
Music Muse	5/5 stars
MovieCues	5/5 stars
Tracksounds	10/10 stars
Movie Wave	2/5 stars

Patsy Morita of Allmusic wrote favourably about An Unexpected Journey, but noted that the soundtrack was not as "sweeping and epic as that for [Jackson's] The Lord of the Rings", attributing this to the smaller scale of Bilbo's adventure compared to the events of The Lord of the Rings. Danny Gonzalez of Examiner.com, however, was very positive, commenting that The Hobbit soundtrack matched the style and tone of The Lord of the Rings, and that the opening for An Unexpected Journey was much better than that of The Fellowship of the Ring. Christian Clemmensen of Filmtracks wrote "despite all these issues, Shore's music for this franchise remains more intellectually constructed and impressively rendered than anything else churning out of the industry during this time. Just as it was with The Phantom Menace in 1999, tapered expectations are absolutely necessary to appreciate An Unexpected Journey. And regardless of whatever issues linger with the score as it resides in the film, collectors someday will be treated, based upon precedent, to the truly complete recordings that will yield a stunning, five-star listening experience on their own."

Jonathan Broxton of Movie Music UK wrote "The score for An Unexpected Journey fits confidently within the pantheon of Howard Shore's Lord of the Rings universe, regularly alluding to the existing themes, manipulating them once in a while to keep them fresh and interesting, and blending them seamlessly with the half dozen or so new musical identities specific to this film. Anyone who enjoyed the music of original Lord of the Rings trilogy will find a great deal to their liking here too, as its layers, depths and complexities reveal themselves more and more with repeated listens." Writing for Music Muse, "As the trilogy gets grander in scale, as it surely will, Shore's new music could reach heights beyond the wildest of our imaginations. Until then, An Unexpected Journey will be playing for a long time". Music Cues based critic wrote: "though, no matter which album you go for, whilst the score's flaws in the film are no doubt disappointing, looking at it as a standalone soundtrack album, it is in my opinion the finest score of 2012 that fits well into Shore's already well-established musical world of Middle Earth. Anyone who enjoyed the Lord of the Rings scores will certainly enjoy this. Familiar favourites return from those scores, with Shore ensuring that they're presented in new and interesting arrangements, and the score contains a whole host of enjoyable new music as well. The depth and complexities in the music make repeated listens beneficial to the enjoyment of it, and I for one can't wait for the next two instalments."

Tracksounds based critic Edmund Meinerts wrote: "The Hobbit is a fantastic achievement, a worthy chapter in the ongoing musical legendarium of Middle-earth and, for this reviewer, the finest film score of 2012." James Southall of Movie Wave wrote "There are some fine highlights (the action finale "Out of the Frying Pan" is pretty spectacular) and it's very clear from the general reaction that my feelings place me firmly in the minority – and frankly it's not difficult to imagine that the unnecessarily padded film left Shore in a much more difficult place than the fine ones he scored for Jackson before – but ultimately, it feels like a huge chore to sit through it all." The song "Misty Mountains" became popular among Tolkien fans.

== Track listing ==
=== Standard edition ===
Disc 1
No.	Title	Length
1.	"My Dear Frodo"	8:04
2.	"Old Friends"	4:29
3.	"An Unexpected Party"	3:52
4.	"Axe or Sword?"	5:59
5.	"Misty Mountains" (Music by David Donaldson, David Long, Steve Roche and Janet Roddick; performed by Richard Armitage and The Dwarf Cast)	1:42
6.	"The Adventure Begins"	2:06
7.	"The World is Ahead"	2:18
8.	"An Ancient Enemy"	4:58
9.	"Radagast the Brown"	4:54
10.	"Roast Mutton" (Contains excerpts of "Misty Mountains" by Donaldson, Long, Roche and Roddick)	4:03
11.	"A Troll-Hoard"	2:39
12.	"The Hill of Sorcery"	3:51
13.	"Warg-Scouts"	3:05

Disc 2
No.	Title	Length
1.	"The Hidden Valley"	3:50
2.	"Moon Runes"	3:20
3.	"The Defiler"	1:15
4.	"The White Council"	7:20
5.	"Over Hill" (Contains excerpts of "Misty Mountains" by Donaldson, Long, Roche and Roddick)	3:43
6.	"A Thunder Battle"	3:55
7.	"Under Hill"	1:54
8.	"Riddles in the Dark"	5:22
9.	"Brass Buttons"	7:38
10.	"Out of the Frying-Pan"	5:54
11.	"A Good Omen"	5:46
12.	"Song of the Lonely Mountain" (Lyrics and Performance by Neil Finn, music by Finn, Donaldson, Long, Roche and Roddick)	4:10
13.	"Dreaming of Bag End"	1:49

=== Special edition ===
The two-disc special edition contains six bonus tracks and six extended tracks.

Disc 1
No.	Title	Length
1.	"My Dear Frodo"	8:03
2.	"Old Friends" (Extended Version)	5:00
3.	"An Unexpected Party" (Extended Version)	4:08
4.	"Blunt the Knives" (Lyrics by J. R. R. Tolkien, music by Stephen Gallagher; performed by The Dwarf Cast, exclusive bonus track)	1:01
5.	"Axe or Sword?"	5:59
6.	"Misty Mountains" (Performed by Richard Armitage and The Dwarf Cast)	1:42
7.	"The Adventure Begins"	2:04
8.	"The World is Ahead" (Contains excerpts of "Misty Mountains" by Donaldson, Long, Roche and Roddick)	2:19
9.	"An Ancient Enemy"	4:56
10.	"Radagast the Brown" (Extended Version)	6:37
11.	"The Trollshaws" (Exclusive Bonus Track)	2:08
12.	"Roast Mutton" (Extended Version)	4:56
13.	"A Troll-Hoard"	2:38
14.	"The Hill of Sorcery"	3:50
15.	"Warg-Scouts"	3:02

Disc 2
No.	Title	Length
1.	"The Hidden Valley"	3:50
2.	"Moon Runes" (Extended Version)	3:39
3.	"The Defiler"	1:14
4.	"The White Council" (Extended Version)	9:40
5.	"Over Hill" (Contains excerpts of "Misty Mountains" by Donaldson, Long, Roche and Roddick)	3:42
6.	"A Thunder Battle"	3:54
7.	"Under Hill"	1:54
8.	"Riddles in the Dark"	5:21
9.	"Brass Buttons"	7:37
10.	"Out of the Frying-Pan"	5:55
11.	"A Good Omen"	5:45
12.	"Song of the Lonely Mountain" (Lyrics and Performance by Neil Finn, Extended Version)	6:00
13.	"Dreaming of Bag End"	1:56
14.	"A Very Respectable Hobbit" (Exclusive Bonus Track)	1:20
15.	"Erebor" (Exclusive Bonus Track)	1:19
16.	"The Dwarf Lords" (Exclusive Bonus Track)	2:01
17.	"The Edge of the Wild" (Contains excerpts of "Misty Mountains" by Donaldson, Long, Roche and Roddick; Exclusive Bonus Track)	3:34

== Chart performance ==
=== Weekly charts ===
Chart (2012–13)	Peak position
Australian Albums (ARIA)	45
Austrian Albums (Ö3 Austria)	16
Belgian Albums (Ultratop Flanders)	25
Belgian Albums (Ultratop Wallonia)	54
French Albums (SNEP)	70
German Albums (Offizielle Top 100)	14
Irish Albums (IRMA)	79
South Korean International Albums (Circle)	8
Dutch Albums (Album Top 100)	40
New Zealand Albums (RMNZ)	32
Polish Albums (ZPAV)	28
Scottish Albums (Official Charts)	59
Spanish Albums (Promusicae)	28
Swedish Albums (Sverigetopplistan)	52
Swiss Albums (Schweizer Hitparade)	40
UK Albums (Official Charts)	61
UK Soundtrack Albums (Official Charts)	1
US Billboard 200	30
US Soundtrack Albums (Billboard)	3
US Top Independent Albums (Billboard)	3

=== Year-end charts ===
Chart (2013)	Position
Belgian Albums (Ultratop Flanders)	187
US Billboard 200	194
US Soundtrack Albums (Billboard)	7

== Certifications ==
Region	Certification	Certified units/sales
Canada (Music Canada)	Gold	40,000^{^}
Germany (BVMI)	Gold	100,000^{^}
^{^} Shipments figures based on certification alone.

== Accolades ==
Organization	Award category	Recipients	Result
ASCAP Awards	Top Box Office Films	Howard Shore	Won
Central Ohio Film Critics Association	Best Score	Howard Shore	Nominated
Colonne Sonore Awards	Best Music for a Foreign Language Film	Howard Shore	Won
Houston Film Critics Society	Best Original Song	Howard Shore	Nominated
International Film Music Critics Association Awards	Film Score of the Year	Howard Shore	Nominated
International Film Music Critics Association Awards	Best Original Score for a Fantasy/Science Fiction/Horror Film	Howard Shore	Nominated
Saturn Awards	Best Music	Howard Shore	Nominated
Tumblr Movie Awards	Best Song in a Movie	Song of The Lonely Mountain	Nominated
Tumblr Movie Awards	Best Original Score	Howard Shore	Nominated
Washington D.C. Area Film Critics Association	Best Score	Howard Shore	Nominated
World Soundtrack Awards	Best Original Film Score Of The Year	Howard Shore	Nominated
