= Saving Grace (1998 film) =

1998 New Zealand film

- Directed by: Costa Botes
- Based on: Saving Grace by Duncan Sarkies
- Produced by: Larry Parr
- Starring: Kirsty Hamilton; Jim Moriarty; Denise O'Connell
- Cinematography: Sean O'Donnell
- Edited by: Michael J. Horton
- Music by: David Donaldson; Plan 9; Steve Roche; Janet Roddick
- Release date: October 1998 (Chicago International Film Festival)
- Running time: 87 minutes
- Country: New Zealand
- Language: English

Saving Grace is a 1998 film produced in New Zealand based on a play by Duncan Sarkies. It was directed by Costa Botes and stars Kirsty Hamilton and Jim Moriarty.

== Plot ==
Unemployed teenager Grace Cuthberston meets the mysterious Gerald Hutchinson; the two eventually become lovers. Gerald then claims to be Christ, and Grace has to determine whether he is mad and if there is a reason for the coincidences and "miracles" that seem to be happening.

== Cast ==
- Wairere Barnsley as Sister
- Tina Cleary as Receptionist
- Eteuati Ete as Preacher
- Kirsty Hamilton as Grace
- Rhys Morgan as Gerald at 20
- Jim Moriarty as Gerald
- James Moriarty as Young Gerald
- Denise O'Connell as Mum

== Reviews ==
- 1997 Valladolid International Film Festival (Spain)
- 1997 Asia-Pacific Film Festival
- 1998 Montreal World Film Festival
- 1998 Bucheon International Fantastic Film Festival (South Korea)
- 1998 Chicago International Film Festival
- 1999 Fantasporto (Portugal)

== Awards ==
- 1997 New Zealand Film and TV Awards – (Best Feature Film Score) – (Best Soundtrack – Feature Film)
