= World Soundtrack Award for Best Original Song Written Directly for a Film =

Annual Belgian music award

The World Soundtrack Award for Best Original Song Written Directly for a Film (a.k.a. "Best Original Song") is one of the three main prizes given by the World Soundtrack Academy to honour the best movie soundtracks. It has been given out each year since the Awards' debut in 2001.

== Winners and nominees ==
=== 2000s ===
==== 2001 ====
- "Come What May" (from Moulin Rouge!) – David Baerwald and Kevin Gilbert
  - "For Always" (from Artificial Intelligence: A.I.) – John Williams and Cynthia Weil
  - "Quante Cose Chiare" (from Azzurro) – Louis Crelier & Lucia Albertoni
  - "Soy un Angelito" (from Felicidades) – Daniel Tarrab & Andrés Goldstein
  - "Where the Dream Takes You" (from Atlantis: The Lost Empire) – Diane Warren and James Newton Howard

==== 2002 ====
- "If I Didn't Have You" (from Monsters, Inc.) – Randy Newman †
  - "The Dream Within" (from Final Fantasy: The Spirits Within) – Elliot Goldenthal, Dick Rudolph, and Lara Fabian
  - "Here I Am" (from Spirit: Stallion of the Cimarron) – Hans Zimmer, Bryan Adams, and Gretchen Peters
  - "This is Where I Belong" (from Spirit: Stallion of the Cimarron) – Hans Zimmer, Bryan Adams, and R.J. Lange
  - "Until" (from Kate & Leopold) – Sting

==== 2003 ====
- "The Hands That Built America" (from Gangs of New York) – Adam Clayton, David Evans, Paul Hewson, and Larry Mullen, Jr.
  - "Burn It Blue" (from Frida) – Julie Taymor and Elliot Goldenthal
  - "Gollum's Song" (from The Lord of the Rings: The Two Towers) – Howard Shore, Fran Walsh, Janet Roddick, David Donaldson, Steve Roche, and David Long
  - "Jungle Rhythm" (from The Jungle Book 2) – Paul Grabowsky and Lorraine Feather
  - "Lose Yourself" (from 8 Mile) – Eminem, Jeff Bass, and Luis Resto †
  - "Nothing in This World" (from The Quiet American) – Craig Armstrong

==== 2004 ====
- "You Will Be My Ain True Love" (from Cold Mountain) – Sting
  - "Accidentally in Love" (from Shrek 2) – Adam Duritz, Dan Vickrey, David Immerglück, David Bryson, and Matthew Malley
  - "Into the West" (from The Lord of the Rings: The Return of the King) – Annie Lennox, Howard Shore, and Fran Walsh †
  - "Man of the Hour" (from Big Fish) – Eddie Vedder
  - "Remember Me" (from Troy) – James Horner and Cynthia Weil

==== 2005 ====
- "Old Habits Die Hard" (from Alfie) – David A. Stewart and Mick Jagger
  - "Al otro lado del río" (from The Motorcycle Diaries) – Jorge Drexler †
  - "Believe" (from The Polar Express) – Alan Silvestri & Glen Ballard
  - "Learn to Be Lonely" (from The Phantom of the Opera) – Andrew Lloyd Webber & Charles Hart
  - "Million Voices" (from Hotel Rwanda) – Wyclef Jean, Jerry "Wonder" Duplessis & Andrea Guerra

==== 2006 ====
- "Our Town" (from Cars) – Randy Newman
  - "A Love That Will Never Grow Old" (from Brokeback Mountain) – Gustavo Santaolalla & Bernie Taupin
  - "Can't Take It In" (from The Chronicles of Narnia: The Lion, The Witch and The Wardrobe) – Harry Gregson-Williams & Imogen Heap
  - "Magic Works" (from Harry Potter and the Goblet of Fire) – Jarvis Cocker, Jonny Greenwood, Phil Selway, Steve Mackey, Steve Claydon & Jason Buckle; String Arrangement by Patrick Doyle
  - "Mdlwembe" (from Tsotsi) – Kabelo 'Kaybee' Ikaneng & Zola

==== 2007 ====
- "You Know My Name" (from Casino Royale) – Chris Cornell and David Arnold
  - "Falling Slowly" (from Once) – Glen Hansard and Markéta Irglová †
  - "I Need to Wake Up" (from An Inconvenient Truth) – Melissa Etheridge †
  - "Le Festin" (from Ratatouille) – Michael Giacchino
  - "When You Taught Me How to Dance" (from Miss Potter) – Mike Batt, Nigel Westlake, and Richard Maltby Jr.

==== 2008 ====
- "Down to Earth" (from WALL-E) – Thomas Newman and Peter Gabriel
  - "A Hero Comes Home" (from Beowulf) – Glen Ballard and Alan Silvestri
  - "Despedida" (from Love in the Time of Cholera) – Antonio Pinto and Shakira
  - "Do You Feel Me" (from American Gangster) – Diane Warren
  - "Guaranteed" (from Into the Wild) – Eddie Vedder

==== 2009 ====
- "Jai Ho" (from Slumdog Millionaire) – A. R. Rahman, Gulzar, and Tanvi Shah †
  - "Gran Torino" (from Gran Torino) – Jamie Cullum, Clint Eastwood, Kyle Eastwood, and Michael Stevens
  - "O... Saya" (from Slumdog Millionaire) – A. R. Rahman and Mathangi Arulpragasam
  - "Run & Hide" (from Je l'aimais) – Anna Chalon
  - "The Wrestler" (from The Wrestler) – Bruce Springsteen

=== 2010s ===
==== 2010 ====
- "The Weary Kind" (from Crazy Heart) – Ryan Bingham & T-Bone Burnett †
  - "Almost There" (from The Princess and the Frog) – Randy Newman
  - "I See You" (from Avatar) – James Horner, Simon Franglen & Kuk Harrell
  - "(I Want to) Come Home" (from Everybody's Fine) – Paul McCartney
  - "Sticks & Stones" (from How to Train Your Dragon) – Jón Birgisson

==== 2011 ====
- "We Belong Together" (from Toy Story 3) – Randy Newman †
  - "Coming Home" (from Country Strong) – Bob DiPiero, Tom Douglas, Hillary Lindsey, and Troy Verges
  - "I See the Light" (from Tangled) – Alan Menken and Glenn Slater
  - "If I Rise" (from 127 Hours) – A. R. Rahman, Dido Armstrong, and Rollo Armstrong
  - "You Haven't Seen the Last of Me" (from Burlesque) – Diane Warren

==== 2012 ====
- "Lay Your Head Down" (from Albert Nobbs) – Brian Byrne and Glenn Close
  - "Breath of Life" (from Snow White and the Huntsman) – Florence Welch and Isabella Summers
  - "The Living Proof" (from The Help) – Thomas Newman, Mary J. Blige, Harvey Mason, Jr., and Damon Thomas
  - "Man or Muppet" (from The Muppets) – Bret McKenzie †
  - "Masterpiece" (from W.E.) – Madonna, Julie Frost, and Jimmy Harry

==== 2013 ====
- "Skyfall" (from Skyfall) – Adele and Paul Epworth †
  - "The Bathtub" (from Beasts of the Southern Wild) – Dan Romer and Benh Zeitlin
  - "Oblivion" (from Oblivion) – Anthony Gonzalez and Susanne Sundfør
  - "Pi's Lullaby" (from Life of Pi) – Mychael Danna and Bombay Jayashri
  - "Young and Beautiful" (from The Great Gatsby) – Lana Del Rey and Rick Nowels

==== 2014 ====
- "Happy" (from Despicable Me 2) – Pharrell Williams
  - "Amen" (from All Is Lost) – Alex Ebert
  - "Let It Go" (from Frozen) – Kristen Anderson-Lopez & Robert Lopez †
  - "The Moon Song" (from Her) – Karen O & Spike Jonze
  - "Ordinary Love" (from Mandela: Long Walk to Freedom) – Bono, The Edge, Adam Clayton, Larry Mullen Jr. & Brian Burton

==== 2015 ====
- "The Apology Song" (from The Book of Life) – Gustavo Santaolalla and Paul Williams
  - "Carry Me Home" (from The Divergent Series: Insurgent) – Joseph Trapanese & Christopher Taylor
  - "Glory" (from Selma) – John Legend, Common, and Rhymefest †
  - "Grateful" (from Beyond the Lights) – Diane Warren
  - "Tell Me" (from Lost River) – Johnny Jewel

==== 2016 ====
- "None of Them Are You" (from Anomalisa) – Carter Burwell & Charlie Kaufman
  - "Better When I'm Dancin'" (from The Peanuts Movie) – Meghan Trainor & Thaddeus Dixon
  - "Hypnosis" (from Kahlil Gibran's The Prophet) – Damien Rice
  - "True Love Avenue" (from Jenny's Wedding) – Brian Byrne & Kasey Jones
  - "Writing's on the Wall" (from Spectre) – Sam Smith & Jimmy Napes †

==== 2017 ====
- "City of Stars" (from La La Land) – Justin Hurwitz, Benj Pasek, and Justin Paul †
  - "Can't Stop the Feeling!" (from Trolls) – Justin Timberlake, Max Martin, and Shellback
  - "How Far I'll Go" (from Moana) – Lin-Manuel Miranda
  - "Never Give Up" (from Lion) – Sia Furler and Greg Kurstin
  - "Runnin'" (from Hidden Figures) – Pharrell Williams

==== 2018 ====
- "Black Panther" (Black Panther) – Kendrick Duckworth, Mark Spears, Kevin Gomringer, Tim Gomringer, and Matt Schaeffer
  - "Never Forget" (from Murder on the Orient Express) – Patrick Doyle and Kenneth Branagh
  - "Remember Me" (from Coco) – Kristen Anderson-Lopez and Robert Lopez †
  - "Stand Up for Something" (from Marshall) – Diane Warren and Common
  - "This Is Me" (from The Greatest Showman) – Benj Pasek and Justin Paul

==== 2019 ====
- "Shallow" (from A Star is Born) – Lady Gaga, Andrew Wyatt, Anthony Rossomando, and Mark Ronson †
  - "The Place Where Lost Things Go" (from Mary Poppins Returns) – Marc Shaiman and Scott Wittman
  - "Requiem for a Private War" (from A Private War) – Annie Lennox
  - "Sunflower" (from Spider-Man: Into the Spider-Verse) – Khalif Brown, Louis Bell, Austin Post, William Walsh, Carter Lang, and Carl Rosen
  - "When a Cowboy Trades His Spurs for Wings" (from The Ballad of Buster Scruggs) – David Rawlings and Gillian Welch

=== 2020s ===
==== 2020 ====
- "Stand Up" (from Harriet) – Joshuah Brian Campbell & Cynthia Erivo
  - "I Can't Let You Throw Yourself Away" (from Toy Story 4) – Randy Newman
  - "(I'm Gonna) Love Me Again" (from Rocketman) – Elton John & Bernie Taupin †
  - "Into the Unknown" (from Frozen II) – Kristen Anderson-Lopez & Robert Lopez
  - "One Little Soldier" (from Bombshell) – Regina Spektor

==== 2021 ====
- "Call Me Cruella" (from Cruella) – Nicholas Britell, Florence Welch, Steph Jones, Jordan Powers & Taura Stinson
  - "Fight for You" (from Judas and the Black Messiah) – H.E.R., D'Mile & Tiara Thomas †
  - "Husavik" (from Eurovision Song Contest: The Story of Fire Saga) – Savan Kotecha, Rickard Göransson & Fat Max Gsus
  - "Hear My Voice" (from The Trial of the Chicago 7) – Daniel Pemberton & Celeste Waite
  - "Loyal Brave True" (from Mulan) – Harry Gregson-Williams, Jamie Hartman, Rosi Golan & Billy Grabtree
  - "Rain Song" (from Minari) – Emile Mosseri

==== 2022 ====
- "No Time to Die" (from No Time to Die) – Billie Eilish and Finneas O'Connell †
  - "Blome Swete Lilie Flour" (from The Green Knight) – Daniel Hart
  - "Hold My Hand" (from Top Gun: Maverick) – BloodPop and Stefani Germanotta
  - "Just Look Up" (from Don't Look Up) – Nicholas Britell, Scott "Kid Cudi" Mescudi, Ariana Grande, and Taura Stinson
  - "Strange World" (from Slow Horses) – Daniel Pemberton and Mick Jagger
  - "We Don't Talk About Bruno" (from Encanto) – Lin-Manuel Miranda

==== 2023 ====
- "Your Personal Trash Man Can" (from The Marvelous Mrs. Maisel – season 5) – Thomas Mizer & Curtis Moore
  - "Carolina" (from Where the Crawdads Sing) – Taylor Swift
  - "Ciao Papa" (from Guillermo del Toro's Pinocchio) – Alexandre Desplat, Guillermo del Toro, and Roeban Katz
  - "Keep Rising" (from The Woman King) – Jessy Wilson, Jeremy Lutito, and Angélique Kidjo
  - "Lift Me Up" (from Black Panther: Wakanda Forever) – Temilade Openiyi, Robyn Fenty, Ludwig Göransson, and Ryan Coogler

==== 2024 ====
- "What Was I Made For?" (from Barbie) – Billie Eilish and Finneas O'Connell †
  - "Dance the Night" (from Barbie) – Mark Ronson, Andrew Wyatt, Caroline Ailin, and Dua Lipa
  - "I'm Just Ken" (from Barbie) – Andrew Wyatt and Mark Ronson
  - "It Never Went Away" (from American Symphony) – Dan Wilson and Jon Batiste
  - "Road to Freedom" (from Rustin) – Lenny Kravitz
  - "Wahzhazhe (A Song for My People)" (from Killers of the Flower Moon) – Scott George
  - "You've Never Had Chocolate Like This" (from Wonka) – Neil Hannon, Paul King, and Simon Farnaby

==== 2025 ====
- "El Mal" (from Emilia Pérez) – Clément Ducol, Camille, and Jacques Audiard †
  - "Beautiful That Way" (from The Last Showgirl) – Andrew Wyatt, Lykke Li, and Miley Cyrus
  - "I Lied to You" (from Sinners) – Ludwig Göransson and Raphael Saadiq
  - "Never Too Late" (from Elton John: Never Too Late) – Elton John, Brandi Carlile, Andrew Watt, and Bernie Taupin
  - "Winter Coat" (from Blitz) – Nicholas Britell, Steve McQueen, and Taura Stinson

==== 2026 ====
- "Golden" (from KPop Demon Hunters) – Ejae, Mark Sonnenblick, Joong Gyu-kwak, Yu Han Lee, Hee Dong Nam, Jeong Hoon Seo, and Teddy Park †
  - "House" (from Wuthering Heights) – Charlotte Aitchison, John Cale, Nathan Klein, and Finn Keane
  - "No Place Like Home" (from Wicked: For Good) – Stephen Schwartz
  - "Stolen Tale" (from Hedda) – Hildur Guðnadóttir and Nia DaCosta
  - "Train Dreams" (from Train Dreams) – Nick Cave and Bryce Dessner

== Notes ==
"†" means that the song won the Academy Award for Best Original Song.
