= Forgotten Silver =

1995 New Zealand television film

- UK DVD cover
- Directed by: Peter Jackson; Costa Botes
- Written by: Peter Jackson; Costa Botes
- Produced by: Sue Rogers
- Starring: Thomas Robins; Jeffrey Thomas; Peter Jackson; Costa Botes; Harvey Weinstein; Leonard Maltin; Sam Neill
- Cinematography: Alun Bollinger; Gerry Vasbenter
- Edited by: Michael J. Horton
- Music by: Duncan Davidson; David Donaldson; Plan 9 Steve Roche; Janet Roddick
- Production company: WingNut Films
- Release date: 29 October 1995
- Running time: 53 minutes
- Country: New Zealand
- Language: English
- Box office: $26,459

Forgotten Silver is a 1995 New Zealand mockumentary film that purports to tell the story of a pioneering New Zealand filmmaker. It was written and directed by Peter Jackson and Costa Botes, both of whom appear in the film in their roles as makers of the documentary.

== Synopsis ==
Forgotten Silver purports to tell the story of "forgotten" New Zealand filmmaker Colin McKenzie, and the rediscovery of his lost films, which presenter Peter Jackson claims to have found in an old shed. McKenzie is presented as the first and greatest innovator of modern cinema, single-handedly inventing the tracking shot (by accident), the close-up (unintentionally), and both sound and colour film years before their historically documented creation. The film also shows fragments of an epic Biblical film, Salome, supposedly made by McKenzie in a giant set in the forests of New Zealand, and a "computer enhancement" of a McKenzie film proving that New Zealander Richard Pearse was the first man to invent a powered aircraft, several months before the Wright Brothers.

The film also shows a (staged) premiere screening of a recovered McKenzie film presented by film promoter Lindsay Shelton. It features deadpan commentary from actor/director Sam Neill and director and film archivist John O'Shea, as well as critical praise from international industry notables including film historian Leonard Maltin, and Harvey Weinstein of Miramax Films.

In reality, McKenzie is a fictional character, and the films featured in Forgotten Silver were all created by Peter Jackson, carefully mimicking the style of early cinema. The interviewees are all acting. Thomas Robins, the actor who portrays Colin McKenzie, is today more easily recognized by audiences as Sméagol's ill-fated cousin Déagol in Jackson's The Lord of the Rings: The Return of the King.

== Cast ==
As themselves:

- Jeffrey Thomas (narrator)
- Peter Jackson
- Johnny Morris
- Costa Botes
- Harvey Weinstein
- Leonard Maltin
- Sam Neill
- John O'Shea
- Marguerite Hurst
- Lindsay Shelton

Actors:

- Beatrice Ashton - Hannah McKenzie
- Thomas Robins - Colin McKenzie
- Richard Shirtcliffe - Brooke McKenzie
- Peter Corrigan - Stan "the Man" Wilson
- Sarah McLeod - May Belle

== Production ==
Costa Botes directed the "documentary" portions while Peter Jackson created the "archive footage" supposedly filmed by McKenzie. Jackson also shot fake interviews in Los Angeles, including the one with Weinstein.

== Reception ==
The film was first aired on Television New Zealand's channel TV ONE at a time usually dedicated to plays and mini-series, but was billed and introduced as a serious documentary. Many viewers were fooled until the directors shortly afterwards revealed that it was a hoax. This created controversy. The film was later screened at film festivals.

On the review aggregator website Rotten Tomatoes, 100% of 10 critics' reviews are positive.

== Memoir ==
In April of 2025, writer, co-creator and director Costa Botes published Remembering Forgotten Silver: The Film that Fooled a Nation, a complete memoir of the production and its controversial aftermath. Botes died in November of that year, at the age of 67.

== Bibliography ==
- Conrich, Ian/Smith, Roy (2006): Fool's Gold: New Zealand's Forgotten Silver, Myth and National Identity. In: Rhodes, Gary Don/Springer, John Parris (eds.) (2006): Docufictions. Essays on the intersection of documentary and fictional filmmaking. Jefferson, NC: McFarland, pp. 230–236.
- Roscoe, Jane/Hight, Craig (1997): Mocking silver: Reinventing the documentary project (or, Grierson lies bleeding). In: Continuum: Journal of Media & Cultural Studies, 11:1, pp. 67–82 (full text; Article provides background information and an analysis of audience responses to the film)
- Roscoe, Jane/Hight, Craig (2006): Forgotten Silver: A New Zealand Television Hoax and Its Audience. In: Juhasz, Alexandra/Lerner, Jesse (eds.) (2006): F is for Phony. Fake Documentary and Truth’s Undoing. Minneapolis: University of Minnesota Press, pp. 171–186.
