= A Dangerous Method (soundtrack) =

A Dangerous Method (Original Motion Picture Soundtrack)

Soundtrack album by Howard Shore
- Released: 21 November 2011
- Recorded: 2011
- Genre: Film score; classical
- Length: 65:07
- Label: Sony Classical
- Producer: Howard Shore

Howard Shore chronology
The Twilight Saga: Eclipse (2010)	A Dangerous Method (Original Motion Picture Soundtrack) (2011)	Hugo (2011)

A Dangerous Method (Original Motion Picture Soundtrack) is the soundtrack to the 2011 film A Dangerous Method, directed by David Cronenberg. The film's musical score is composed by Howard Shore, which consisted of 18 cues tuned for the film, along with the opera piece "Siegfried Idyll" by Richard Wagner. The score was released through Sony Classical Records on 21 November 2011.

== Development ==
The film is scored by Cronenberg's regular collaborator Howard Shore. "Siegfried Idyll", a poem written by Richard Wagner was used throughout the film indicating Carl Jung's (Michael Fassbender) adulterous affair with Sabina Spielrien (Keira Knightley). Cronenberg recalled that "the idea was that she would have a sinful relationship with Jung and then give birth to this hero, this heroic Siegfried".

The score is primarily based on "Siegfried Idyll" as its instrumentation for a small-size chamber orchestra which felt appropriate for the score. He did not write much of the score as it followed the opera in terms of its overall narrative structure. He used the "bones" of the opera to create the structure and the arc of the music. He used a piano arrangement of the opera performed by pianist Lang Lang.

== Critical reception ==
Thomas Kiefner of Maintitles wrote "While not for everyone classical music lovers will embrace the Wagner influence and the piano performance of Lang Lang". Filmtracks.com wrote "Even if you love both the Wagner source and Shore's inherent darkness, don't expect the classical beauty of the combined sum to outshine the stark, gloomy tone of that overarching demeanor." William Ruhlmann of AllMusic wrote "Shore supports the setting and plot line with restrained, contemplative music in a classical mode suggestive of the late Romantic Era." Mark Jenkins of National Public Radio called it as a "conventional score", and Justin Chang of Variety described it as a "memorable score". Danny King of The Film Stage called it as "effective". John Powers of Vogue described it as "compellingly scored".

== Track listing ==
All music is composed by Howard Shore, except where noted.

A Dangerous Method (Original Motion Picture Soundtrack) track listing
No.	Title	Length
1.	"Burghölzli"	1:23
2.	"Miss Spielrein"	1:37
3.	"Galvanometer"	1:04
4.	"Carriage"	1:08
5.	"He's Very Persuasive"	2:14
6.	"Sabina"	0:57
7.	"Otto Gross"	2:47
8.	"A Boat with Red Sails"	1:02
9.	"Siegfried"	1:01
10.	"Freedom"	1:14
11.	"End of the Affair"	1:06
12.	"Letters"	2:25
13.	"Confession"	1:30
14.	"Risk My Authority"	1:11
15.	"Vienna"	1:10
16.	"Only One God"	2:26
17.	"Something Unforgivable"	2:51
18.	"Reflection"	5:57
19.	"Siegfried Idyll" (Richard Wagner)	32:04
Total length:		65:07

== Credits ==
Credits adapted from liner notes

- Music composer, producer, orchestrator and conductor – Howard Shore
- Orchestra contractor – Joris Bartsch Buhle
- Piano – Nikolaus Resa
- Music programming – James Sizemore
- Recording and mixing – Simon Rhodes
- Mastering – Jonathan Schultz
- Music editor – Jennifer Dunnington, Jonathan Schultz
- Music co-ordinator – Alan Frey
- Copyist – Amy Baer, Vic Fraser
- Executive producer – Joe Augustine
- Production manager – Elizabeth Cotnoir
- Technician – Tim Starnes

== Accolades ==
Accolades for A Dangerous Method (Original Motion Picture Soundtrack)
Awards group	Category	Result	Ref.
Genie Awards	Best Original Score	Won	
World Soundtrack Awards	Best Composer of the Year	Won	
