= Perfect Strangers (2003 film) =

- Directed by: Gaylene Preston
- Written by: Gaylene Preston
- Produced by: Jay Cassells; Robin Laing; Gaylene Preston
- Starring: Sam Neill; Rachael Blake
- Cinematography: Alun Bollinger
- Edited by: John Gilbert
- Music by: David Donaldson; Steve Roche; Janet Roddick
- Production companies: Gaylene Preston Productions; New Zealand Film Commission; New Zealand Film Production Fund; New Zealand on Air; TVNZ
- Distributed by: 20th Century Fox (New Zealand); FilmRise (International)
- Release dates: October 2003 (Chicago); 25 February 2004 (New Zealand)
- Running time: 96 minutes
- Country: New Zealand
- Language: English

Perfect Strangers is a 2003 New Zealand film directed by Gaylene Preston and starring Sam Neill and Rachael Blake.

== Plot ==
Melanie (Rachael Blake) is a waitress who works at an unnamed restaurant, in New Zealand. One night, she meets a man (Sam Neill), they spend some time together, before Melanie asks him if he wants to go home together. Choosing to go to his place, they go to a dock where a small boat is. Melanie passes out, and only wakes up when they in the middle of open ocean. It transpires that the man has taken her to his island, where he wants her to stay and for them to be in a romantic relationship. Despite sexual attraction between the pair, Melanie cannot recover from the shock of being brought to a deserted island without her approval, and distrusts the man's motives.

== Cast ==
- Sam Neill as The Man
- Rachael Blake as Melanie
- Robyn Malcolm as Aileen
- Madeleine Sami as Andrea
- Jed Brophy as Pete
- Joel Tobeck as Bill
- Paul Glover as Jim

== Reviews ==
- 2003 Chicago International Film Festival
