= Rachael Blake =

Australian actress (born 1971)

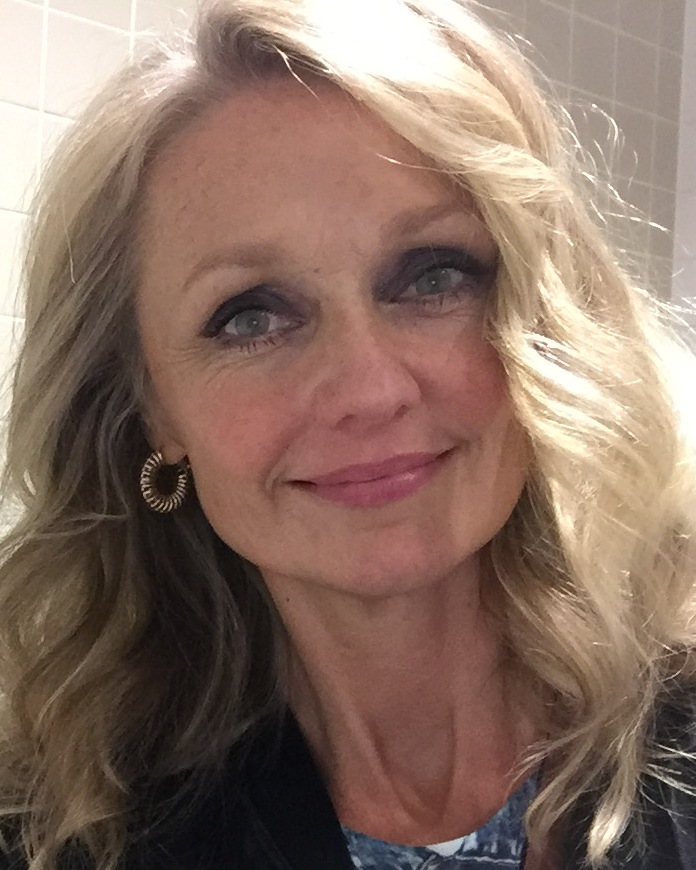
- Born: Rachael Morelle Blake; 26 May 1971 (age 55); Perth, Western Australia, Australia
- Occupation: Actress
- Years active: 1995–present
- Spouse: Tony Martin (m. 2003)
- Awards: Fantasporto Award for Best Actress; 2004 Perfect Strangers; IF Award for Best Actress; 2001 Lantana; Logie Award for Most Outstanding Actress in a Series; 1999 Wildside

Rachael Morelle Blake (born 26 May 1971) is an Australian actress.

== Early life ==
Blake was born in Perth, Western Australia. At the age of 18 months, she moved to England with her English parents, only to return to Perth at age 11. Blake was born deaf in one ear, a condition that was rectified by a series of operations undertaken before she was six. To overcome shyness and her hearing problem, her mother enrolled her in elocution lessons, which she continued until age 17. After attending the John Curtin College of the Arts high school in Perth, she applied to Sydney's National Institute of Dramatic Art (NIDA) but was rejected due to her age of 17. She was accepted to NIDA when she was 19.

== Acting career ==
At 13, Blake was cast in a short film. After studying at NIDA, she worked on Australian television shows Home and Away as Mandy Thomas (1995–1997), Pacific Drive, and Heartbreak High (1996). Blake's first feature film role was as Amy in the Australian children's movie Paws (1997). In 1997, she took the role of Dr Maxine Summers in the ABC crime drama Wildside.

She has also starred in several films, including 2001's Lantana with Anthony LaPaglia, as well as 2003's Perfect Strangers for which she won the Fantasporto Award for Best Actress. Between 2006–2007, she played Hilary Davenport in the British satirical black comedy Suburban Shootout. She played "Belinda" in a British TV movie, Clapham Junction, in 2007. In 2009, she starred in the UKTV mini-series False Witness. She also played a main role in The Prisoner. In 2010, she portrayed Hazel Hawke in the telemovie Hawke.

Blake played the character of Clara in the erotic drama Sleeping Beauty.

In 2012, Blake portrayed Kris Perry in the theatre production of 8 in Sydney and Melbourne. In 2013, she portrayed Lady Tuckworth in the HBO Asia series Serangoon Road. She played a main role in the 2014 drama film Melody, for which she has received recognition (see below). She appeared in the 2016 film Gods of Egypt.

== Awards and honours ==
Blake won the Silver Logie Award for 'Most Outstanding Actress' at the Logie Awards (1999). She was nominated four times at the Australian film Institute (since 2011 called the AACTA Australian Academy of Cinema and Television Arts Awards) and won the award for 'Best Performance by an Actress in a Leading Role in a Television Drama' for Wildside in 1998 and 'Best Actress for a Supporting role' for Lantana in 2001. She received the Montréal World Film Festival Award for Best Actress for her portrayal, in the title role, in the 2014 drama film Melody (2014). In 2004, she won the Best Actress (Melhor Actriz) – Directors' Week Award at Fantasporto film festival (2004) and the Best Actress Award at Pacific Meridian film festival, Vladivostok for Perfect Strangers (2003). In 2018, she was part of the ensemble cast that won the 'Outstanding Performance by an Ensemble Series in a Drama Series' by Equity Ensemble Awards 2018 for Cleverman (2016).

== Personal life ==
In 2003, she married Wildside co-star Tony Martin. They later starred together in Serangoon Road.

== Filmography ==
=== Film ===
| Year | Title | Role | Notes |
|---|---|---|---|
| 1997 | Paws | Amy | Feature film |
| 2000 | Blindman's Bluff | Sophie | Film Short |
| 2001 | Lantana | Jane O'May | Feature film |
| 2001 | The Letter | Herself – Narrator (voice) | Film Short |
| 2002 | Whispering in the Dark | Woman | Film Short |
| 2003 | Perfect Strangers | Melanie | Feature film, NZ |
| 2004 | Tom White | Helen White | Feature film |
| 2005 | Derailed | Susan Davis | Feature film, US/UK |
| 2008 | Summer | Katy | Feature film, UK/GERMANY |
| 2009 | Pinprick | Miriam | Feature film, Switzerland/Hungary |
| 2010 | Cherry Tree Lane | Christine | Feature film, UK |
| 2011 | Sleeping Beauty | Clara | Feature film |
| 2014 | My Mistress | Kate Boyd | Feature film |
| 2014 | Melody | Emily | Feature film, Belgium/Luxenbourg/FRANCE |
| 2015 | Truth | Betsy West | Feature film, US/AUSTRALIA |
| 2016 | Gods of Egypt | Isis | Feature film, AUSTRALIA/US/China/Hong Kong |
| 2017 | Breath | Mrs. Pike | Feature film |
| 2018 | The Second | The Writer | Feature film |
| 2018 | Slam | Joanne Hendricks | Feature film |

=== Television ===
| Year | Title | Role | Notes |
|---|---|---|---|
| 1995–1997 | Home and Away | Recurring role: Mandy Thomas | TV series, 28 episodes |
| 1996 | Fire | Recurring guest role: Beatrice | TV series, 1 episode "Vendetta I" |
| 1996 | Heartbreak High | Guest role: Lara | TV series, 1 episode: "4.20" |
| 1996; 2000; 2003 | Good Morning Australia | Guest | TV series, 1 episode |
| 1997 | Water Rats | Guest role: Carly Bridges | TV series, season 2, episode 15: "Stolen Time" |
| 1997–1999 | Wildside | Regular lead role: Maxine Summers | TV series, 60 episodes |
| 1998 | Good News Week | Guest | TV series, 1 episode |
| 1999 | The 1999 Annual TV Week Logie Awards | Herself | TV special |
| 2000 | Good Morning Australia | Guest (with Tony Martin) | TV series, 1 episode |
| 2000 | Nowhere to Land | Anne Prescott | TV film |
| 2000 | The Three Stooges | Recurring role: Helen Howard | TV film |
| 2003 | Grass Roots | Recurring role: Faith Twohill | TV series, 3 episodes: "Art", "Prostitution", "Investigation" |
| 2003 | The Movie Show | Guest | TV series, 1 episode |
| 2003 | Good Morning Australia | Guest (with Sam Neill) | TV series, 1 episode |
| 2003 | Mornings | Guest (with Sam Neill) | TV series, 1 episode |
| 2003 | Dying to Leave | Narrator (voice) | TV film documentary |
| 2003 | The 2003 Australian Film Institute Awards | Presenter | TV special |
| 2004 | Auf Wiedersehen, Pet | Recurring guest role: Naomi Hedges | TV series, 2 episodes: "Au Revoir: Parts 1 & 2" |
| 2006 | Bon Voyage | Recurring role: Elizabeth Aldred | TV miniseries, 2 episodes |
| 2006 | The Philosopher's Zone | Reader | TV series, 4 episodes |
| 2006 | Riot or Revolution: Eureka Stockade 1854 | Narrator | TV filmdocumentary |
| 2006–2007 | Suburban Shootout | Regular role: Hilary Davenport | TV series, 11 episodes |
| 2007 | Clapham Junction | Belinda Hopkirk | TV film |
| 2008 | Lewis | Guest role: Ann Kriel | TV series, 1 episode: "Music to Die For" |
| 2009 | False Witness | Lead role: Det. Chief Insp. Julie Hales | TV miniseries |
| 2009 | The Prisoner | Regular role: M2 | TV miniseries, 6 episodes |
| 2010 | A Six Hour Film Shot in 92 Days: The Diary of 'The Prisoner' | Herself | Short film documentary |
| 2010 | Beautiful Prison: The World of 'The Prisoner' | Herself | Short film documentary |
| 2010 | Hawke | Hazel Hawke | TV film |
| 2010 | Immortal | Narrator | Film documentary |
| 2011 | Cannes Film Festival | Interviewee | TV special |
| 2012 | The Straits | Regular role: Natasha | TV miniseries, 7 episodes |
| 2013 | Jabbed: Love, Fear And Vaccines | Narrator | TV film documentary |
| 2013 | Miss Fisher's Murder Mysteries | Guest role: Ailsa Wilton | TV series, 1 episode: "Blood at the Wheel" |
| 2013 | Serangoon Road | Regular role: Lady Tuckworth | TV miniseries, 9 episodes |
| 2016 | Rake | Recurring role: Ruth Rogers | TV series, 3 episodes: "4.1", "4.2", "4.3" |
| 2017 | Cleverman | Regular role: Marion Frith | TV series, season 2, 6 episodes |
| 2018 | Today | Guest (with Susie Porter) | TV series, 1 episode |
| 2018 | Today Extra | Guest (with Susie Porter) | TV series, 1 episode |
| 2021 | Eden | Recurring role: Katia Van Der Linden | TV series, 5 episodes |
| 2022 | Significant Others | Regular lead role: Ursula | TV miniseries, 6 episodes |
