= When the Cows Come Home =

New Zealand documentary film

- Directed by: Costa Botes
- Produced by: Costa Botes
- Starring: Andrew Johnstone
- Cinematography: Costa Botes
- Edited by: Costa Botes
- Music by: Tom McLeod
- Distributed by: New Zealand Film Commission
- Release date: 31 July 2022
- Running time: 104 minutes
- Country: New Zealand
- Language: English

When the Cows Come Home is a 2022 New Zealand documentary film, directed by Costa Botes. The documentary follows Andrew Johnstone and his connection with his cows, Tilly and Maggie. It premiered 31 July at the NZ International Film Festival.

Botes met Johnstone on Facebook and became interested in his online posts about his farm life. After meeting in person Botes started filming him on his property in the Waikato region.

== Reception ==
Jeremy Quinn of the Otago Daily Times gave it 4 stars and said "DBotes is a skilled and experienced documentarian, and the film is beautifully shot, impressively structured, insightful and touching without being exploitative or manipulative, and dare I say it, inspirational." Graeme Tuckett in the Press gave it 4 1/2 stars and writes "When the Cows Come Home is an appropriately bucolic and unrushed film. It reminded me at times of The Devil and Daniel Johnston. But also of Gunda, that mighty ode to a pig that I still reckon was the best film I saw last year. But mostly I was just grateful that there is still a place in our cinemas and in our consciousness for a story as small — and as universal — as this." On 1 News Richard Martin says"I can't think of anything more quintessentially New Zealand than a farmer who has struggled with mental health issues and whose life is changed by a friendship with some livestock."
