= Chris Winitana =

New Zealand journalist and author

- Born: 1960 (age 65–66); Taumarunui
- Education: University of Waikato Wellington Polytechnic Journalism School
- Occupations: Journalist, playwright, author and producer
- Known for: Māori custom and language expert
- Spouse: Tina Maree Kaipara

Chris Winitana (Ngāti Tūwharetoa, Ngāi Tūhoe) is a journalist, playwright, author and producer, as well as a Māori cultural and language expert from New Zealand.

He founded Ngā Tama a Rangi Kohanga Reo, Te Kura o te Ahorangi, and Te Whare Ahorangi.

== Career ==
Winitana began his career as a journalist at the Waikato Times in 1981. He later worked at The New Zealand Herald in 1982 and Sunday News in 1983–85, before teaching at the Waiariki Māori Journalism Course, where he was employed to recruit more Māori journalists.

Winitana and his sister founded Ngā Tama a Rangi Kohanga Reo in Hamilton in 1988. Winitana co-founded Te Kura o te Ahorangi in the same year, a kura kaupapa for children ages 7 to 14, which his children attended. Winitana is a prolific contributor to school and learning resources for kura kaupapa and kohanga reo, writing 250 waita.

In 1993, Winitana and his partner founded Te Whare Ahorangi, a Māori school of arts in Tūrangi. He produced the first Māori Broadway-style musical Ahorangi Genesis in the same year, and in 2000 produced Ahorangi 2000 in which his 11-year-old son Tupoutahi played the lead male role. The musical was supported by Te Waka Toi, the Māori branch of Creative New Zealand.

Winitana published his second book My Language, My Inspiration and its Māori translation Tōku reo, Tōku Ohooho in 2011 to positive reviews. Te Karaka, a Ngāi Tahu magazine, describes the book as complex and in-depth, challenging for some readers, but giving "new motivation and invigoration" for learning and speaking Māori. Tōku reo, Tōku Ohooho was listed in Books of Mana in 2025 as one of the 180 most significant works of Māori literature.

From 2012 to 2015 Winitana hosted Te Tepu, a Whakaata Māori current affairs show that interviews prominent kaumatua and New Zealand's best speakers of te reo Māori about local and international current events.

Winitana moved to Whakaata Māori's new Māori language show Paepae in 2015 when Te Tepu ended, co-hosting alongside his son Tupoutahi Winitana. The show was cross-generational, with both young and older guests debating political issues. The show aired on Sundays and ran for one 35-episode season.

In 2017 Winitana was a judge for Te Matatini, in the categories of Moteatea and Manukura Tane and Titonga Hou Moteatea.

In 2022 and 2023 Winitana was a head tutor for the Te Rito Journalism cadetship programme, intended to address the lack of diverse voices in New Zealand journalism, with a focus on Māori and Pacific voices. Te Rito won the International News Media Association award for Best Innovation in Newsroom Transformation at the 2023 Global Media Awards in New York.

Winitana will return as a judge for Te Matatini 2025 in the category of Te Kairangi o te Reo.

== Personal life ==
Winitana was born in Taumaranui, New Zealand. He grew up across the North Island, attending Kawerau Intermediate, Fraser High School, Melville High School, and Huntly College. He attended The University of Waikato before entering Wellington Polytechnic Journalism School for a year.

Winitana is married to Tina Maree Kaipara, and has children with her, including Topoutahi Winitana.

== Publications ==
=== Fiction ===
- Poking Tongues (1985)
- White in Brown (1986)
- Te Uruuru Whenua o Ngātoroirangi (2021)

=== Non-fiction ===
- Legends of Aotearoa (2001)
- Tōku Reo Tōku Ohooho (2011)
- My Language, My Inspiration (2011)
- The Meaning of Mana

== Awards ==
Year	Won	Publication	Award	Award giver
2021	Finalist	Te Uruuru Whenua o Ngātoroirangi	Best First Book Award	2021 NZ CYA Book Awards – Te Kura Pounamu finalists (Te Reo Māori)
2012	Winner	for Tōku Reo, Tōku Ohooho: My Language, My Inspiration	Māori Language Award	New Zealand Post Book Awards
2006	Winner	Koi	Best Maori Language Children's Programme	
