= Hugo (soundtrack) =

Hugo (Original Score)

Film score by Howard Shore
- Released: November 15, 2011
- Studios: Abbey Road Studios, London
- Genres: Contemporary classical; orchestral
- Length: 67:33
- Label: Howe Records
- Producer: Jonathan Schultz

Howard Shore chronology
The Twilight Saga: Eclipse (2010)	Hugo (2011)	A Dangerous Method (2012)

The original score to the 2011 Martin Scorsese-directed historical drama film Hugo featured music composed and conducted by Scorsese's norm collaborator Howard Shore. It was released by his own label Howe Records on November 15, 2011 under the title Hugo (Original Score) and has 21 tracks from the selections of his score running for nearly an-hour, unlike the initial score which lasted for one-hour and seventeen minutes, being the extensive score he composed for Scorsese's films. The full score would be later unveiled as a part of For Your Consideration for the 2011–2012 film awards season. It also featured an original song "Cœur volant" performed by French singer-songwriter Zaz, that was used in the end credits.

The score used several themes, motifs and variations written in an older style, where much of the score would be available in the first reel of 10 minutes. He used several musical instruments ranging from the 1920s and 1930s, including electronic ones, as well as the symphony orchestra being prominent in the score. The music received critical acclaim and led Shore several nominations for Best Original Score category including Academy Awards, British Academy Film Awards, Critics' Choice Awards, Golden Globe Awards amongst several others.

== Development ==
The film marked the sixth and final collaboration between Howard Shore and Martin Scorsese, following After Hours (1985), Made in Milan (1990), Gangs of New York (2002), The Aviator (2004) and The Departed (2006). Although they collaborated for The Wolf of Wall Street (2013), Shore was not credited for the film's incidental music. Shore wanted to play the music through the perspective of the main character, opining that "For a boy who's Hugo's age, everything is seen with wide-eyed wonder. In fact, you often see Hugo's eyes peering out through the clocks. So it's like a child's view of that world, especially in how Hugo is fascinated with how machines work. And just as he studies their movements, I study the character's actions as I work." Shore revealed that he used to spend time with his eight-year old grandson that helped his approach to the film. He closely associated with Scorsese and editor Thelma Schoonmaker in post-production where much of the score was revealed earlier in the first reel and other themes for Georges Méliès were later introduced.

"The score uses a lot of themes and motifs and variations [...] It's written in an older style. In the first reel of the film, the first 10 minutes, you hear seven main themes of the film. It's a very through-composed piece. … The score is about an hour and 45 minutes — a really extensive score for one of Marty's films."

— Howard Shore

As with the previous films, he writes the compositions in sketch form, where he could deal with the harmony and counterpoint and begins orchestration afterwards. He used the Ondes Martenot, an early electronic musical instrument, which he felt it as ideal for the film, as the film deals with mechanical inventions of the period. He also took the sound of a symphony orchestra from the 1920s, which was the core of the soundtrack, and added that "there's a sextet, a small group, that was really part of the orchestra, and they became the soloists that you hear through the film". He had nearly 88 musicians scoring for the film, which was detailed around the soloists. Much of the instruments included gypsy guitar, upright bass, tack piano, a 1930s trap-kit, alto and musette de cour, a French accordion.

Some of the musical references included, in a scene where Méliès goes to a carnival, and into a tent where the Lumière brothers are playing their landmark film L'Arrivée d'un train en gare de La Ciotat (1895) and a live pianist next play the music of French composer Camille Saint-Saëns' music. Shore admitted "When we use the term "traditional" music, I think we're really referring to the movies that we love from the 1930's and the 40's, films whose music derived what those original accompanists were playing during the silent era. They used popular classical music, where it was done on a solo piano, or with an orchestra."

For the music in concluding moments, that "The conclusion involves both of their music and both of their thematic ideals and pieces. And of course there are certain things they share — the love of fixing things, the love of clocks and trains and mechanical things — so those thematic elements that are in the score work with both characters. The Hugo character is like a young Méliès. I detail each scene to the colors I want to use and the sounds of the small group and the orchestra. It's kind of an intimate relationship that I try to develop between how I feel as the composer watching the scene and writing something form my heart, and how I feel as the audience watching the scene." The film also featured an end credit song "Cœur volant" co-written by Shore, Elizabeth Cotnoir and Zaz, who also sang the track. He used melodies within the score to write the track, saying "I love the idea of creating themes that you hear right at the beginning of the film, and carry right through the arch of it, from the mystery of the automaton and to the adventure of these kids and the adventure of the police inspector. So it's particularly satisfying for me when all of those melodies finally break out into song." He called Zaz's voice as much as "fantastic resolution to be an instrument" which was a beautiful way to end the film.

== Track listing ==
=== Standard release ===
The original score album was released by Shore's record label Howe Records digitally on November 15, 2011, which would be followed by a physical release on December 6. In 2022, the album was pressed into a 180-gram double disc vinyl published by Enjoy the Ride Records and Mondo.

All music is composed by Howard Shore.

No.	Title	Length
1.	"The Thief"	4:20
2.	"The Chase"	2:50
3.	"The Clocks"	4:28
4.	"Snowfall"	1:50
5.	"Hugo's Father"	3:24
6.	"Ashes"	2:33
7.	"The Station Inspector"	1:10
8.	"Bookstore"	1:51
9.	"The Movies"	1:29
10.	"The Message"	4:36
11.	"The Armoire"	2:32
12.	"Purpose"	2:04
13.	"The Plan"	2:48
14.	"Trains"	2:50
15.	"Papa George Made Movies"	1:52
16.	"The Invention of Dreams"	6:28
17.	"A Ghost in the Station"	6:00
18.	"A Train Arrives in the Station"	3:25
19.	"The Magician"	2:33
20.	"Cœur volant" (feat. Zaz)	4:19
21.	"Winding It Up"	4:11
Total length:		67:33

=== Complete score ===
The full score album was released by Paramount Pictures as a part of For Your Consideration marketing campaign for the subsequent award season. It featured 49 score cues, which is 10 minutes longer than the standard release.

No.	Title	Length
1.	"Through The Station"	4:23
2.	"Caught"	0:47
3.	"Chased Pt. 1"	0:48
4.	"Chased Pt. 2"	1:13
5.	"Into The Tunnels"	1:41
6.	"Winding The Clocks"	1:28
7.	"The Notebook"	0:34
8.	"Graveyard"	7:00
9.	"The Funeral"	2:13
10.	"Inspector & Max"	1:30
11.	"Burnt"	0:55
12.	"To The Bookstore"	1:00
13.	"Be Steadfast"	0:25
14.	"The Mouse"	2:13
15.	"Automaton/Orphans"	2:09
16.	"Police"	0:44
17.	"Watching From The Grate"	0:26
18.	"Movie Theater"	1:02
19.	"Learning"	0:32
20.	"Inspector"	1:36
21.	"Watch Your Step"	0:19
22.	"The Key"	1:05
23.	"Drawing"	4:24
24.	"Moon"	2:17
25.	"Thanks Automaton/To Papa Georges"	0:41
26.	"Mama Jeanne"	0:40
27.	"Bedroom Armoire"	2:15
28.	"Box Opens"	0:38
29.	"Upset"	2:00
30.	"Film Academy Library"	1:04
31.	"Tabard Studios"	3:20
32.	"Wrench Drops"	3:53
33.	"Dreams"	0:49
34.	"Train Crash"	1:22
35.	"Becoming The Automaton"	0:47
36.	"Uncle Claude"	1:11
37.	"A Great Artist"	2:09
38.	"Trip To The Moon"	1:30
39.	"Magic"	1:12
40.	"Making Movies"	0:23
41.	"Back To The Station"	0:18
42.	"Hiding"	0:26
43.	"Arrest"	0:56
44.	"Into The Clocks"	4:04
45.	"Train"	1:34
46.	"Walking Home"	0:31
47.	"Film Academy Tribute"	1:31
48.	"Finding Your Way Home"	0:48
49.	"Georges & Hugo"	3:03
Total length:		77:49

== Critical response ==
James Southall of Movie Wave wrote "Howard Shore's music inhabits the film in a way which recalls the great magical scores for dreamlike family adventures of the past, and it holds up remarkably well away from it on the lengthy album. It is easily his strongest work this side of Lord of the Rings." William Ruhlmann of AllMusic reviewed positively, saying "If this sounds like the score is a little choppy, especially in its later parts, it is never less than engaging and gives the sense of a film of subtle and complex moods." Filmtracks.com wrote "While the French elements in the score as a whole, especially in the marching comedy portions, will test your patience, the remainder is well enough integrated to appeal to purely fantasy interests. With practically no challenging or disturbing passages, Hugo is a consistently affable listening experience on its lengthy album, and the beauty of the song adaptation completes an easily recommendable package." Writing for Variety, Peter Debruge said "Howard Shore's whimsical score sets the tone as Hugo surveys these dynamics, playfully taking its cue from the resident cafe musicians".

== Accolades ==
List of awards and nominations
Award / Film Festival	Date of Ceremony	Category	Recipient(s)	Result
Academy Awards	February 26, 2012	Best Original Score	Howard Shore	Nominated
British Academy Film Awards	February 12, 2012	Best Original Music	Howard Shore	Nominated
Critics' Choice Awards	January 12, 2012	Best Score	Howard Shore	Nominated
Chicago Film Critics Association	January 7, 2012	Best Original Score	Howard Shore	Nominated
Golden Globe Awards	January 15, 2012	Best Original Score	Howard Shore	Nominated
Grammy Awards	February 10, 2013	Best Score Soundtrack For Visual Media	Howard Shore	Nominated
Indiana Film Critics Association	December 12, 2011	Best Musical Score	Howard Shore	Nominated
San Diego Film Critics Society Awards	December 14, 2011	Best Score	Howard Shore	Nominated
Saturn Awards	June 20, 2012	Best Music	Howard Shore	Nominated
Washington D.C. Area Film Critics Association Awards	December 5, 2011	Best Score	Howard Shore	Nominated
World Soundtrack Academy	October 20, 2012	Best Original Score of the Year	Howard Shore	Nominated
World Soundtrack Academy	October 20, 2012	Soundtrack Composer of the Year	Howard Shore	Nominated

== Credits ==
Credits adapted from CD liner notes.

Album credits

- Music composer – Howard Shore
- Music producer – Jonathan Schultz
- Programming – James Sizemore
- Auricle programming – Tim Starnes
- Recording, mixing, mastering – Simon Rhodes
- Music editor– Jennifer Dunnington, Jonathan Schultz
- Assistant music editor – Ben Pedersen, Gisburg Smialek
- Score editor – Kirsty Whalley, Rob Houston, Yann McCullough
- Music supervision – Randall Poster
- Music co-ordinator – Karen Elliott
- Score co-ordinator – Alan Frey
- Copyist – Amy Baer, Howard Beck, Joshua Green, Vic Fraser
- Production manager – Elizabeth Cotnoir, Rich Palecek
- Executive producer – Joe Augustine
- Executive in charge of music – Randy Spendlove

Performer credits

- Bass – Chris Laurence
- Guitar – John Parricelli
- Musette – Eddie Hession
- Ondes Martenot – Cynthia Millar
- Percussion – Paul Clarvis
- Piano – Simon Chamberlain
- Orchestra conductor – Howard Shore
- Orchestra contractor – Isobel Griffiths
