= Costa Botes =

New Zealand filmmaker

- Born: Konstantinos Botes; 27 December 1958; Agrídia, Imbros, Turkey
- Died: November 21, 2025 (aged 66); Newtown, New Zealand
- Occupation: Filmmaker

Costa Botes (27 December 1958 - 21 November 2025) was a New Zealand filmmaker. He is known for co-creating the mockumentary Forgotten Silver with Peter Jackson.

Botes directed the feature film Saving Grave, released in 1998. It was an adaptation of a 1994 play by Duncan Sarkies.

Botes created a number of documentary films including The Last Dogs of Winter (2011), Act of Kindness (2015, with Sven Pannell), Angie (2018) and When the Cows Come Home (2022).
