= A Dangerous Method =

2011 film by David Cronenberg

- Theatrical release poster
- Directed by: David Cronenberg
- Screenplay by: Christopher Hampton
- Based on: The Talking Cure by Christopher Hampton; A Most Dangerous Method by John Kerr
- Produced by: Jeremy Thomas
- Starring: Keira Knightley; Viggo Mortensen; Michael Fassbender; Vincent Cassel; Sarah Gadon
- Cinematography: Peter Suschitzky
- Edited by: Ronald Sanders
- Music by: Howard Shore
- Production companies: Lago Film; Prospero Pictures; Recorded Picture Company; Millbrook Pictures; Telefilm Canada; Corus Entertainment; HanWay Films; Elbe Film; Talking Cure Productions
- Distributed by: Entertainment One (Canada); Universal Pictures (Germany and Austria); Lionsgate UK (United Kingdom)
- Release dates: 2 September 2011 (Venice); 10 November 2011 (Germany); 13 January 2012 (Canada); 10 February 2012 (United Kingdom)
- Running time: 99 minutes
- Countries: Canada; Germany; United Kingdom
- Language: English
- Budget: $14 million
- Box office: $30 million

A Dangerous Method is a 2011 historical drama film directed by David Cronenberg. The film stars Keira Knightley, Viggo Mortensen, Michael Fassbender, Sarah Gadon, and Vincent Cassel. Its screenplay was adapted by writer Christopher Hampton from his 2002 stage play The Talking Cure, which was based on the 1993 non-fiction book by John Kerr, A Most Dangerous Method: The Story of Jung, Freud, and Sabina Spielrein.

Set in the period from 1902 to the eve of World War I, A Dangerous Method follows the turbulent relationships between Carl Jung, founder of analytical psychology, Sigmund Freud, founder of the discipline of psychoanalysis, and Sabina Spielrein, initially Jung's patient and later a physician and one of the first female psychoanalysts.

A co-production between British, Canadian, and German production companies, the film marks the third consecutive collaboration between Cronenberg and Viggo Mortensen (after A History of Violence and Eastern Promises). This is also the third Cronenberg film made with British film producer Jeremy Thomas, after they collaborated on the William Burroughs adaptation Naked Lunch and the J. G. Ballard adaptation Crash. Filming took place between May and July 2010 in Cologne on a soundstage, with exterior shots filmed in Vienna. The title sequence was created at Cuppa Coffee Studios and Justin Stephenson.

A Dangerous Method premiered at the 68th Venice Film Festival and was also featured at the 2011 Toronto International Film Festival. The film was theatrically released in Germany on 10 November 2011 by Universal Pictures International, in Canada on 13 January 2012 by Entertainment One and in the United Kingdom on 10 February 2012 by Lionsgate. The film grossed $24 million worldwide and received positive reviews from critics, many praising the performances of Mortensen and Fassbender and Cronenberg's direction. It appeared on several critics' year-end lists. At the 69th Golden Globe Awards, Mortensen was nominated for the Best Supporting Actor – Motion Picture.

== Plot ==
In August 1904, Sabina Spielrein arrives at the Burghölzli, the pre-eminent psychiatric hospital in Zürich, suffering from hysteria and begins a new course of treatment with the young Swiss doctor Carl Jung. He uses word association and dream interpretation as part of his approach to psychoanalysis and finds that Spielrein's condition was triggered by the humiliation and sexual arousal she felt as a child when her father spanked her naked.

Jung and chief of medicine Eugen Bleuler recognize Spielrein's intelligence and energy and allow her to assist them in their experiments. She measures the physical reactions of subjects during word association, to provide empirical data as a scientific basis for psychoanalysis. She soon learns that much of this new science is founded on the doctors' observations of themselves, each other, and their families, not just their patients. The doctors, Jung and Freud, correspond at length before they meet, and begin sharing their dreams and analysing each other, and Freud himself soon adopts Jung as his heir and agent.

Jung finds in Spielrein a kindred spirit, and their attraction deepens due to transference. Jung resists the idea of cheating on his wife, Emma, and breaking the taboo of sex with a patient, but his resolve is weakened by the wild and unrepentant confidences of his new patient Otto Gross, a brilliant, philandering, unstable psychoanalyst. Gross decries monogamy in general and suggests that resistance to transference is symptomatic of the repression of normal, healthy sexual impulses, exhorting Jung to indulge himself with abandon.

Jung finally begins an affair with Spielrein, including rudimentary bondage and spanking. Things become even more tangled as he becomes her advisor to her dissertation; he publishes not only his studies of her as a patient but eventually her treatise as well. Spielrein wants to conceive a child with Jung, but he refuses. After he attempts to confine their relationship again to doctor and patient, she appeals to Freud for his professional help, and forces Jung to tell Freud the truth about their relationship, reminding him that she could have publicly damaged him but did not want to.

Jung and Freud travel to America. However, cracks appear in their friendship as they begin to disagree more frequently on matters of psychoanalysis. Jung and Spielrein meet to work on her dissertation in Switzerland and begin their sexual relationship once more. However, after Jung refuses to leave his wife for her, Spielrein decides to go to Vienna. She meets Freud and says that although she sides with him, she believes he and Jung need to reconcile for psychoanalysis to continue to develop.

Following Freud's collapse at an academic conference, he and Jung continue correspondence via letters. They decide to end their relationship after increasing hostilities and accusations regarding the differences in their conceptualisation of psychoanalysis. Spielrein marries a Russian doctor and, while pregnant, visits Jung and his wife. They discuss psychoanalysis and Jung's new mistress. Jung confides that his love for Spielrein made him a better person.

The film's footnote reveals the eventual fates of the four analysts. Gross starved to death in Berlin in 1920. Freud died of cancer in London in 1939 after being driven out of Vienna by the Nazis. Spielrein trained several analysts in the Soviet Union before she and her two daughters were shot by the Nazis in 1942. Jung emerged from a nervous breakdown to become the world's leading psychologist before dying in 1961.

== Cast ==
- Keira Knightley as Sabina Spielrein
- Viggo Mortensen as Sigmund Freud
- Michael Fassbender as Carl Jung
- Sarah Gadon as Emma Jung
- Vincent Cassel as Otto Gross
- André Hennicke as Eugen Bleuler
- Arndt Schwering-Sohnrey as Sándor Ferenczi

== Production ==
Hampton's earliest version of the screenplay, dating back to the 1990s, was written for Julia Roberts in the role of Sabina Spielrein, but the film was never realized. Hampton re-wrote the screenplay for the stage before producer Jeremy Thomas acquired the rights for both the earlier script and the stage version.

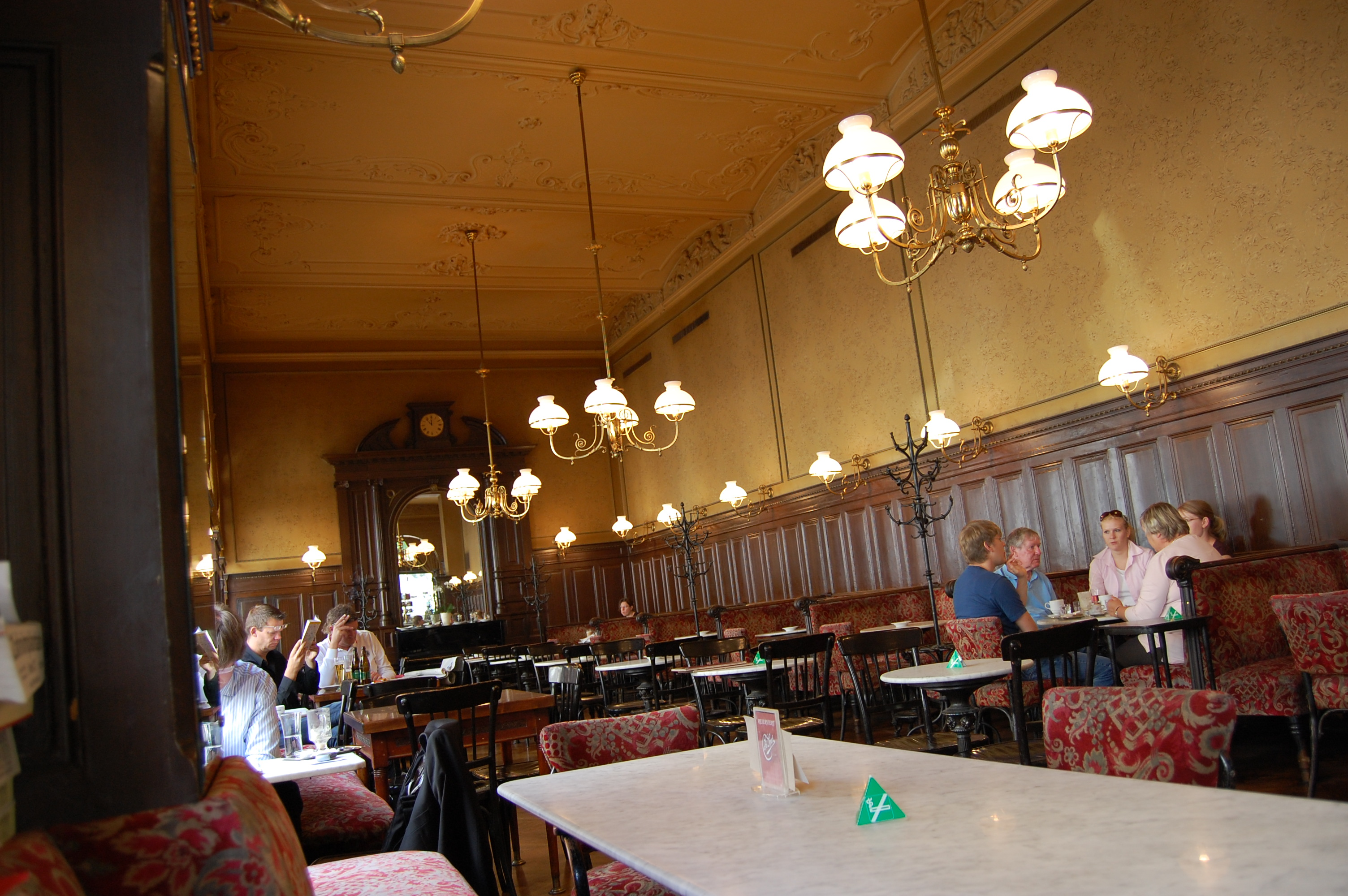
Interior of Café Sperl where a meeting between Jung and Freud was filmed. David Cronenberg said of the shoot, "We almost had to change nothing to make it feel like 1907."

The film was produced by Britain's Recorded Picture Company, with Germany's Lago Film and Canada's Prospero Film acting as co-producers. Additional funding was provided by Medienboard Berlin-Brandenburg, MFG Baden-Württemberg, Filmstiftung NRW, the German Federal Film Board and Film Fund, Ontario Media Development Corp and Millbrook Pictures.

Christoph Waltz was initially cast as Sigmund Freud, but was replaced by Viggo Mortensen due to a scheduling conflict. Christian Bale had been in talks to play Carl Jung, but he too had to drop out because of scheduling conflicts.

The filming began on 26 May and ended on 24 July 2010. Exteriors were shot in Vienna and interiors were filmed on a soundstage in Cologne (MMC Studios Köln), Germany. Viennese locations included the Café Sperl, Berggasse 19, and the Schloss Belvedere. Lake Constance (Bodensee) stood in for Lake Zurich.

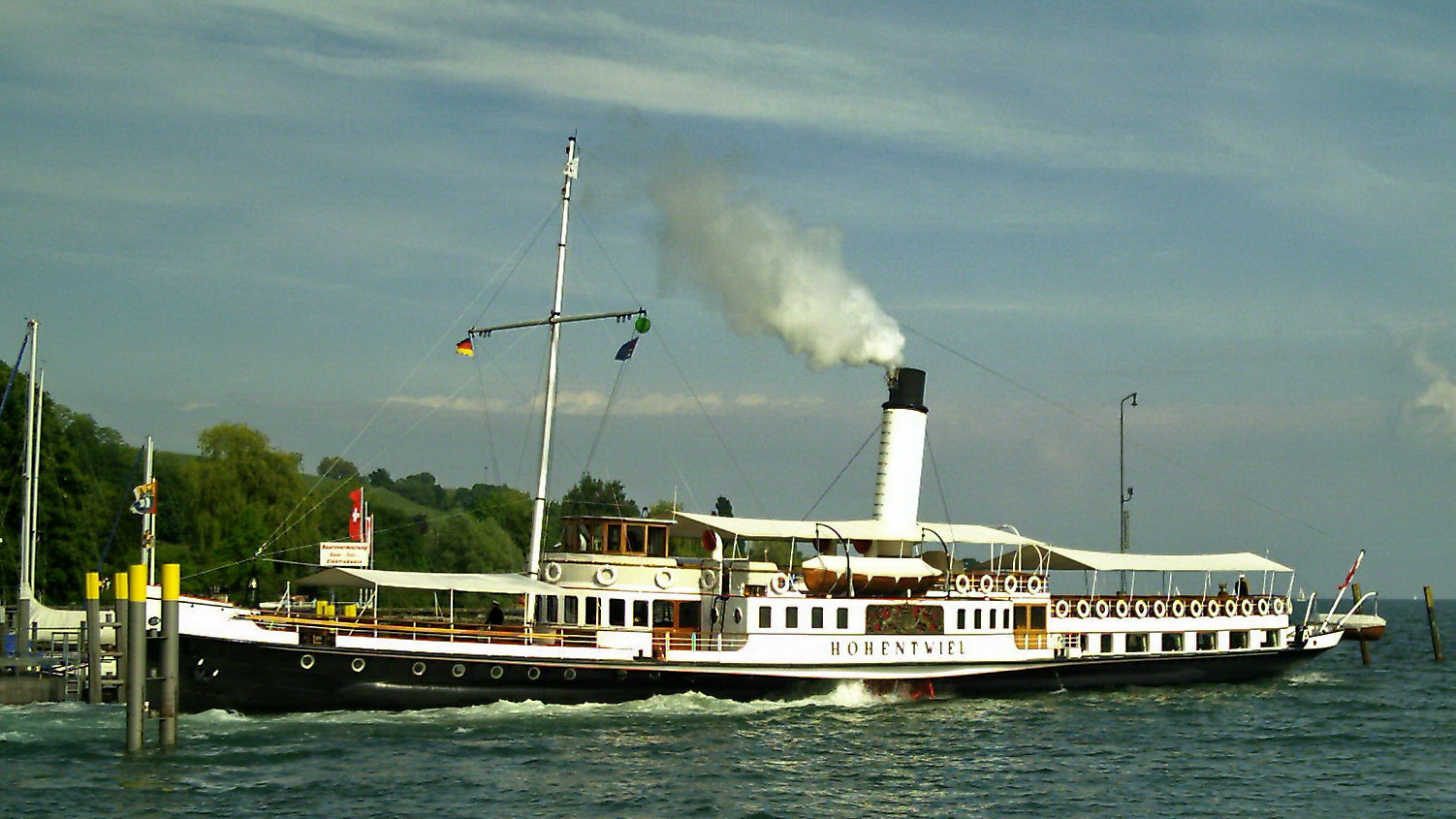
A scene featuring Keira Knightley and Michael Fassbender was filmed aboard the paddle steamer Hohentwiel on Lake Constance

A noted feature of the film is the extensive use in the musical score of leitmotifs from Wagner's third Ring opera Siegfried, mostly in piano transcription. The composer Howard Shore has said that the structure of the film is based on the structure of the Siegfried opera.

== Release ==
Universal Pictures released the film in German-speaking territories, Spain and South Africa, while Lionsgate took rights to the United Kingdom and Sony Pictures Classics distributed the film in the United States. The film debuted at the Venice Film Festival in Italy on 2 September 2011.

== Reception ==
=== Critical response ===
On the review aggregator website Rotten Tomatoes, 78% of 191 critics' reviews are positive, with an average rating of 6.9/10. The website's consensus reads: "A provocative historical fiction about the early days of psychoanalysis, A Dangerous Method is buoyed by terrific performances by Michael Fassbender, Keira Knightley, and Viggo Mortensen." Metacritic, which uses a weighted average, assigned the film a score of 76 out of 100, based on 41 critics, indicating "generally favorable" reviews.

Louise Keller reports from Urban Cinephile, "The best scenes are those between Mortensen and Fassbender...the tension between the two men mounts as their views conflict: Freud insists that sex is an underlying factor in every neurosis while Jung, interested in spiritualism and the occult, is disappointed by what he considers to be Freud's 'rigid pragmatism.'"

Andrew O'Hehir of Salon opines that on the one hand Freud's "single-minded focus on sexual repression as the source of neurosis led to the creation of psychiatry as a legitimate medical and scientific field—one that was often resistant to change and dominated by authoritarian father figures." On the other hand, Sabina's effect on Jung, and "the discoveries they had made together, both in the office and the bedroom," including the potential in "a creative fusion of opposites—doctor and patient, man and woman, dark and light, Jew and Aryan," led to a falling out between the two men "over a variety of issues, most notably the scientific limits of psychiatric inquiry."

In contrast, Steven Rea of The Philadelphia Inquirer wrote that, despite the film's exploration of "the way our subconscious works, the way we repress, and suppress, natural urges—the constant battle between the rational and the instinctive, the civilized and the wild", the film "feels distant, and clinical, in ways you wished it did not." In an interview with The Daily Beast's Marlow Stern, Cronenberg himself is quoted as saying that the love scenes between Jung and Spielrein were "quite clinical. These were people who, even when they were having sex, they were observing themselves having sex because they were so interested in their reactions to things."

The film was listed at number 5 on Film Comment magazine's Best Films of 2011 list.

=== Top ten lists ===
A Dangerous Method was listed on many critics' 2011 top ten lists.

- 1st – J. Hoberman, The Village Voice
- 1st – Glenn Kenny, MSN Movies
- 2nd – Todd McCarthy, The Hollywood Reporter
- 5th – Andrea Gronvall, Chicago Reader
- 5th – Kim Morgan, MSN Movies
- 6th – Eric Hynes, The Village Voice
- 7th – Anne Thompson, Indiewire
- 7th – Richard T. Jameson, MSN Movies
- 8th – Stephen Holden, The New York Times
- 9th – Mark Olsen, Boxoffice Magazine
- 9th – Jim Emerson, MSN Movies
- 10th – Caryn James, Indiewire
- Best of 2011 (listed alphabetically, not ranked) – A.O. Scott, The New York Times
- Best of 2011 (listed alphabetically, not ranked) – Manohla Dargis, The New York Times

== Accolades ==
Year	Award	Category	Recipient(s)	Result
2011	National Board of Review Awards	Spotlight Award	Michael Fassbender (Also for Shame, Jane Eyre, and X-Men: First Class)	Won
2011	Satellite Awards	Actor in a Supporting Role	Viggo Mortensen	Nominated
2011	Los Angeles Film Critics Association Awards	Best Actor	Michael Fassbender (Also for Shame, Jane Eyre, and X-Men: First Class)	Won
2012	Golden Globe Awards	Best Supporting Actor – Motion Picture	Viggo Mortensen	Nominated
2012	London Critics' Circle Film Awards	British Actor of the Year	Michael Fassbender (Also for Shame)	Won
2012	Central Ohio Film Critics Association Awards	Actor of the Year	Michael Fassbender (Also for Shame, Jane Eyre, and X-Men: First Class)	Nominated
2012	Genie Awards	Best Motion Picture	Martin Katz, Marco Mehlitz, Jeremy Thomas	Nominated
2012	Genie Awards	Achievement in Art Direction/Production Design	James Mcateer	Won
2012	Genie Awards	Best Actor	Michael Fassbender	Nominated
2012	Genie Awards	Best Supporting Actor	Viggo Mortensen	Won
2012	Genie Awards	Best Costume Design	Denise Cronenberg	Nominated
2012	Genie Awards	Best Direction	David Cronenberg	Nominated
2012	Genie Awards	Best Editing	Ronald Sanders, C.C.E. A.C.E.	Nominated
2012	Genie Awards	Achievement in Music – Original Score	Howard Shore	Won
2012	Genie Awards	Best Sound	Orest Sushko, Christian Cooke	Won
2012	Genie Awards	Best Sound Editing	Wayne Griffin, Rob Bertola, Tony Currie, Andy Malcolm, Michael O'Farrell	Won
2012	Genie Awards	Best Visual Effects	Jason Edwardh, Oliver Hearsey, Jim Price, Milan Schere, Wojciech Zielinski	Nominated
2012	Sant Jordi Award	Best Foreign Actor	Michael Fassbender (Also for Jane Eyre and X-Men: First Class)	Won
2012	Directors Guild of Canada Awards	Best Direction	David Cronenberg	Won
2012	Directors Guild of Canada Awards	Best Feature Film		Won
2012	Directors Guild of Canada Awards	Best Production Design – Feature Film	James McAteer	Won
2012	Directors Guild of Canada Awards	Best Picture Editing – Feature Film	Ron Sanders	Won
2012	Directors Guild of Canada Awards	Best Sound Editing	Rob Bertola, Tony Currie, Alastair Gray, Michael O'Farrell, Gren-Erich Zwicker	Won

== See also ==
- A Dangerous Method (soundtrack)
