= Janet Roddick =

New Zealand musician and composer

Janet Roddick is a New Zealand musician, singer and composer who belongs to screen composers group Plan 9.

== Early life and education ==
Roddick was born in Hamilton, attended primary school in Lower Hutt and secondary school in Invercargill. She attended the University of Otago, initially studying maths, music, psychology and geography before completing a performance degree in classical singing studying under Honor McKellar.

== Career ==
While at the University of Otago, Roddick performed with the Dunedin Operatic Society in The Boy Friend and Jesus Christ Superstar and at the Fortune Theatre singing Stephen Sondheim songs. In 1984, Roddick completed a performance certificate at the Wellington Polytechnic with Flora Edwards. During her time as a student she was exposed to and became aware of different repertoire (from Webern and Schoenberg to arias), styles of singing and different schools of teaching singing. She made a decision not to pursue a career in classical singing in favour of branching out into other musical styles and developing her improvisational skills and vocal sounds. She was introduced to jazz and improvisation when she joined jazz trio Jungle Suite as vocalist with cellist and guitarist David Long and saxophonist Neill Duncan. Jungle Suite was part of a wider group called the Braille Collective and the larger group the Primitive Art Group.

Roddick was a member of the band Four Volts with Neill Duncan, Anthony and David Donaldson which became Six Volts in 1987 when Long and Steve Roche joined. The band aimed to introduce a wider audience to their music. In 1988, Six Volts played the music for The Threepenny Opera at Downstage Theatre with Roddick playing the part of Pirate Jenny.

Six Volts attended the Edinburgh Festival in 1990 but split up at the end of that year after recording their second album Stretch released in 1991. Roddick then went on to perform with several other groups: Big Fiddle, Babes in the Mood, Cutlery Set and Toro Loca Banda. These collaborations with other musicians enabled Roddick to perform in musical styles such as country and western with Big Fiddle and satirical musical revues with Babes in the Wood. Roddick, Roche, David Donaldson and Tim Robinson formed The Brainchilds, writing their own material.

Roddick, David Donaldson and Roche formed Plan 9, a screen composing company which has worked on music and sound design for movies by directors Peter Jackson, Costa Botes and Gaylene Preston. Films they have worked on include Forgotten Silver, The Dead Room, The Frighteners, The Lord of the Rings, King Kong, and Perfect Strangers. Plan 9 won the Silver Scroll award at the APRA (New Zealand) Music Awards in 2022 for their work The Bewilderness written as a response to the strangeness experienced by the 2020 COVID-19 lockdown.
