= David Donaldson (composer) =

New Zealand musician

David Donaldson (born 1960) is a New Zealand composer and musician.

Donaldson was born in 1960. In the 1980s he was part of the music collective Braille Collective who improvised and made experimental music.

== Composing ==
As part of the "Plan 9" group with Steve Roche and Janet Roddick, Donaldson was involved in designing the soundtracks of the New Zealand Pavilion at World Expo Shanghai 2010.

== Recording ==
Donaldson performed in bands The Labcoats, Six Volts and Thrashing Marlin with Steve Roche. Thrashing Marlin's third album Wits End was described by the Stuff website as "an envelope-pushing but accessible blend of pop songwriting instincts within the sprawl of free-improvisational jazz and collage-rock", and compared to the work of Split Enz and The Mutton Birds.
