= Steve Roche =

New Zealand composer and performer

- Born: Wellington, New Zealand
- Occupations: Composer; performer

Stephen Roche is a New Zealand composer and performer. He is principally known for his involvement in film music and as a creator of film soundtrack and ambient music.

== Early life ==
Roche was raised in Wellington and attended St Patrick's College, Wellington.

== Composing ==
As part of the "Plan 9" group with David Donaldson and Janet Roddick, Donaldson was involved in designing the soundtracks of the New Zealand Pavilion at World Expo Shanghai 2010.

== Recording ==
Donaldson performed in bands The Labcoats, Six Volts and Thrashing Marlin with David Donaldson. Thrashing Marlin's third album Wits End was described by the Stuff website as "an envelope-pushing but accessible blend of pop songwriting instincts within the sprawl of free-improvisational jazz and collage-rock", and compared to the work of Split Enz and The Mutton Birds.
