= Henry Tichborne =

Henry Tichborne may refer to:

- Sir Henry Tichborne (1581–1667), English soldier and politician
- Henry Tichborne, 1st Baron Ferrard (1663–1731), Irish peer
- Sir Henry Tichborne, 3rd Baronet (c. 1624–1689), Hampshire landowner
- Sir Henry Tichborne, 4th Baronet (1655–1743)
- Sir Henry Tichborne, 7th Baronet (1756–1821)
