= Sir Henry Tichborne, 7th Baronet =

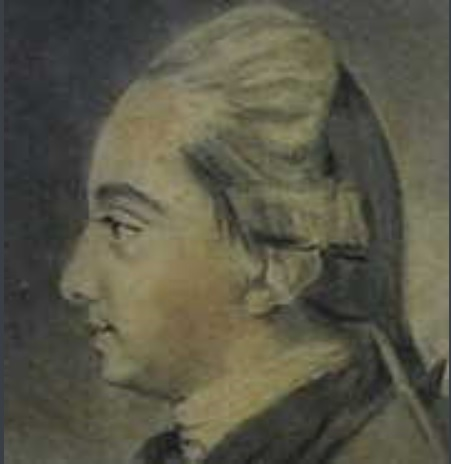
Sir Henry Tichborne

Henry Tichborne (6 September 1756 – 14 June 1821) was the 7th Baronet Tichborne of Tichborne in Hampshire.

== Early life ==
He was born in 1756, the son of Sir Henry Tichborne, 6th Baronet, and Mary (née Blount) Tichborne.

== Career ==
In 1803 Sir Henry Tichborne was captured by the French in Verdun during the Napoleonic Wars and detained as a civil prisoner for some years. With him in captivity were his fourth son, James Tichborne, and Henry Seymour of Knoyle, an English nobleman. Seymour had an affair with Felicity Dailly-Brimont, reputedly the illegitimate daughter of the Duc de Bourbon and his mistress Marie Claude Gaucher-Dailly which resulted in a daughter, Henriette Felicité (c1807–1868). She married James Tichborne in August 1827 and in 1829 gave birth to Roger Charles Doughty Tichborne, the grandson of Henry Tichborne, the 8th Baronet, and later to be the subject of the infamous Tichborne case.

== Personal life ==
On 8 March 1778 he married Elizabeth Lucy Plowden (1758–1829), the eldest daughter of Edmund Plowden of Plowden Hall in Plowden in Shropshire. The Plowdens, like the Tichborne's, were an old Catholic family. The couple had seven sons and a daughter. Their sons included:

- Sir Henry Joseph Tichborne, 8th Baronet (1779–1845), who married Anne Burke, daughter of Sir Thomas Burke, 1st Baronet, in 1806; he fathered seven daughters but no male heir (see the curse connected with the Tichborne Dole).
- Sir Edward Doughty, 9th Baronet (1782–1853), who married Hon. Katherine Arundell, daughter of James Arundell, 9th Baron Arundell of Wardour, in 1827.
- Sir James Francis Doughty-Tichborne, 10th Baronet (1784–1862), who married Henriette Felicite Seymour, daughter of Henry Seymour and Felicite (née Dailly-Brimont) Seymour.

Built by his father the 6th Baronet in 1760, in 1789 Tichborne sold the family estate of Frimley Manor to James Lawrell the elder for £20,000.

Sir Henry died on 14 June 1821. He is buried with his family in St Andrew's Church in Tichborne in Hampshire.

=== Succession ===
Sir Henry was succeeded in 1821 by his eldest son, Henry Joseph Tichborne (1779–1845), the 8th Baronet Tichborne. When Henry Joseph died in 1845 the immediate heir as 9th Baronet Tichborne was his younger brother Edward Doughty, who had assumed the surname of Doughty as a condition of a legacy. Edward's only son died in childhood, so James Tichborne became next in line to the baronetcy, and after him his son, Roger Tichborne.

Baronetage of England
Preceded by Henry Tichborne	Baronet (of Tichborne); 1785–1821	Succeeded by Henry Tichborne
