= Sir John Hermengil Tichborne, 5th Baronet =

John Hermengil Tichborne (1679 – 5 May 1748) was a Jesuit priest and the 5th Baronet Tichborne. He succeeded to the title on the death of his older brother Henry Joseph Tichborne, the 4th Baronet in 1743.

Born in Tichborne in Hampshire in 1679, John Hermengil Tichborne was a younger son of Henry Tichborne, the 3rd Baronet, and Mary née Arundel (1622–1698), the daughter of Charles Arundell, a younger brother of Thomas, Lord Arundell of Wardour, a Catholic family. John Hermengil Tichborne was one of four sons and five daughters, four of whom died in infancy. These included: Henry Joseph Tichborne, the 4th baronet; John and Charles Tichborne, who both died young; Winifred, who died as an infant; Lettice, who married Henry Whettenhall and whose son, Henry, also became a Jesuit priest in Europe; Mary, who became a nun; and Frances, who in 1694 married John Paston.

The Tichborne's were one of the leading Catholic families in Hampshire, and John Hermengil Tichborne entered the Society of Jesus on 21 October 1700 aged 21 and professed on 2 February 1717. Between 1728 and his death in 1748 he lived mostly at Ghent in Belgium.

Father Sir John Hermengil Tichborne died unmarried in Ghent in Belgium in 1748. The title passed to Sir Henry Tichborne, the 6th Baronet.

Baronetage of England
Preceded by Henry Tichborne	Baronet (of Tichborne); 1743–1748	Succeeded by Henry Tichborne
