= William Cresswell =

William Cresswell may refer to:

- William Nicoll Cresswell (1818–1888), English painter
- William Cresswell (Tichborne case) (c. 1829–1904), inmate of the Parramatta Lunatic Asylum, New South Wales, considered as a claimant in the Tichborne case
