= Cumberland Hospital =

Geography
- Location: Westmead, New South Wales, Sydney, Australia
- Coordinates: 33.80187°S 150.99502°E

Organisation
- Type: Specialist

Services
- Speciality: Psychiatric hospital

History
- Former names: Lunatic Asylum, Female Factory
- Constructed: 1817
- Opened: 1849

Links
- Lists: Hospitals in Australia

Cumberland Hospital is a public psychiatric hospital located in Westmead, in Sydney's west. Along with Bungarribee House, Blacktown Hospital it serves the mental health needs of Western Sydney. As a public hospital it is part of the Western Sydney Local Health District (WSLHD).

== History ==
The site was formally the residence of female convicts. Female convicts were housed separately from the male population. In 1817, Governor Macquarie commissioned the building of more permanent structures. Female convicts housed on this site were made to work and the site became known as The Female Factory. The Factory housed unassigned, unmarried female convicts, and their children.

Although transportation of convicts to New South Wales ceased in 1840 the site was maintained as a place for female convicts until 1847.

In 1849, the buildings were redesignated a Lunatic Asylum. The site has remained as a mental health institution to the present day, only taking on its current name in 1983.

In the late 19th century, it was the home of inmate William Cresswell, proposed as a candidate in the Tichborne case, who died there in 1904.
