= Bryan Michie =

- Born: Thomas Bryan Michie; 5 January 1906; Tichborne, Hampshire, England
- Died: 24 March 1971 (aged 65); London, England
- Occupation(s): Radio and television producer, broadcaster, talent scout
- Years active: 1930s–1967

Thomas Bryan Michie (5 January 1906 – 24 March 1971) was a British radio and television producer, broadcaster and executive.

== Biography ==
Born in Tichborne, Hampshire, Bryan Michie started his career as a teacher, and was then a stage actor. He joined the sound effects department of BBC radio in the early 1930s, taking charge of the Effects Studios by 1933. He was responsible for devising and producing the sound effects that needed to be introduced into live radio broadcasts, such as the sounds of galloping horses, engines, and storms.

In 1934 he started producing radio variety shows, including The Air-Do-Wells and Stanelli's Stag Party, and in 1936 began working with Carroll Levis on his programmes with newly discovered performers. He presented and compered other radio shows on the BBC, including In Town Tonight, and, as "Professor Bryan Michie" in 1938, presented the comedy quiz show The Riddle Master on Radio Luxembourg.

Michie also produced a regular slot, "Youth Takes a Bow", presented by Jack Hylton on the BBC radio variety show Monday Night at Seven. The slot developed into a touring talent show for young performers, and was notable for Michie's discovery, in 1938, of the young comedian Ernie Wiseman (later Wise). Michie recommended him to Hylton, and the following year introduced him to another young comedian, Eric Bartholomew (later Morecambe), so starting off their successful long-running comedy partnership.

Through his involvement in talent shows and radio broadcasts, Michie became a well-known personality. Tall and physically imposing, with red hair, he appeared in several films, essentially as himself, including Let's Make a Night of It (1937) and The Magnet (1950). He continued to present and produce BBC radio programmes during, and after, the Second World War, including ENSA shows and Break for Music. Most notably, he was one of the most popular and regular presenters of Housewives' Choice on the Light Programme between 1946 and 1957.

In 1957, he was appointed Programme Manager at the new ITV company covering Wales and the West Country, TWW. He introduced and hosted a new talent spotting programme, Now's Your Chance, later renamed Looking for the Stars. Other programmes he produced or commissioned included Land of Song, featuring Ivor Emmanuel; the jazz programme Dig Dankworth; and Life Begins at 80, which he also hosted. Michie became Programme Controller at TWW in 1963, but faced criticism as he remained based in London while the programmes were produced in Bristol, Cardiff and Swansea. In 1967, TWW lost its ITV franchise to Harlech Television.

Michie died in London in 1971, aged 65.
