= Tichborne Dole =

English charity festival held in Tichborne

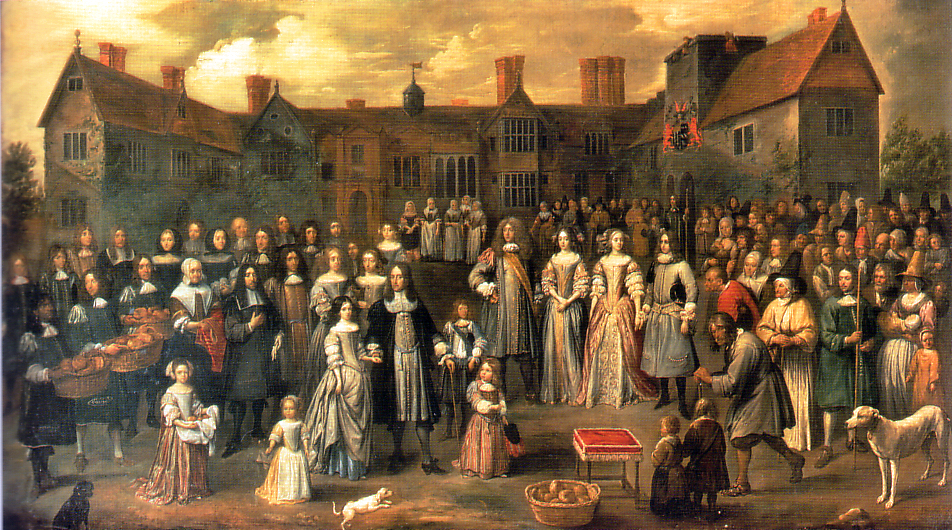
The Tichborne Dole (1671) by Gillis van Tilborgh

The Tichborne Dole is a traditional English festival of charity which is held in the village of Tichborne, Hampshire, during the Feast of the Annunciation. The festival is centered on the handing out of donations of flour, which have been blessed by the local parish priest, from the front of Tichborne House.

The festival dates back to the 12th century (c. 1150) and was started by Lady Mabella Tichborne who, on her death bed, instructed that a donation of farm produce be made to the poor each year. Presently, the terms of the Dole stipulate that adults from the parishes of Tichborne and Cheriton are entitled to claim 1 gallon of flour, and children half a gallon each.

== The Crawls ==
The area of Tichborne which donates to the festival is known as the Crawls. According to local tradition, Lady Tichborne's husband, Sir Roger Tichborne, did not approve of her charity and agreed to her bequest on the condition that the Dole consisted only of produce from land that she was able to encircle under her own power while carrying a burning torch in her hand. Lady Tichborne, who was in poor health, is said to have successfully crawled around a 23-acre (93,000 m^{2}) field before the torch went out, and this area became known as the Crawls.

== The painting ==
The painting was commissioned by Sir Henry Tichborne, the 3rd Baronet. In recent years Sir Henry has come to more prominent notice owing to his commission of and inclusion in the painting 'The Tichborne Dole' (1671) by the Flemish artist Gillis van Tilborch after it was displayed in the 'Treasure Houses of Britain' exhibition in 1985. 'The Tichborne Dole' depicts Sir Henry and his family together with his servants and family priest during the annual distribution of loaves to the poor of Tichborne. The portrait features Sir Henry and his family standing centre left in front of Tichborne House. The portrait was perhaps intended to proclaim Sir Henry's successful rebuilding of the family fortunes after being left heavily in debt by his father, Sir Richard Tichborne, the 2nd Baronet as well as the deeply religious family's attitude towards charity. The painting has been described as '...a document of social history [that] has no peer'..However, considering the trouble Sir Henry suffered as a result of his Catholic faith perhaps instead the painting should be viewed less in the context of a 'document of stark realism' than as a reminder of the social hierarchy of the time, and in particular of that of the place of the Catholic landed gentry in society.

== The curse ==
The story of the Dole holds that Lady Tichborne placed a curse on it to ensure that her request would never be abandoned. According to the curse, if the Dole were to stop, the Tichborne family would bear seven sons, and, in the next generation, seven daughters, leading to the family's name being lost and the house falling into ruins.

The Dole continued from the time of Lady Tichborne's death until 1796, when disturbances during the handing out of the Dole led to local officials ordering it to cease. The Baronet at that time, Sir Henry Tichborne, 8th Bart. was the eldest of seven sons. He had seven daughters but no sons. However his brother Edward did have a son, Henry, born in 1829 but he died in 1836 aged six years old. At this point, fearing that the curse had come to fruition, the Dole was resumed. Edward became the 9th baronet but had no sons. Another of the seven brothers, James, became the 10th baronet. He had two sons, Roger, who was born in 1829 (before the Dole was resumed) and Alfred, born in 1839 (after the resumption of the Dole). Roger was shipwrecked and lost at sea (1854) and Alfred eventually became the 11th baronet on his father's death in 1862. Sir Alfred died in 1866 leaving his wife pregnant with a son, Sir Henry Doughty-Tichborne, 12th Bart.

The dole and curse set the groundwork for the infamous Tichborne Claimant trial of the 19th century.

The Seven Sons

- Sir Henry Joseph Tichborne, 8th Bt (1779-1845)
- Capt Benjamin Edward Tichborne, EICS (1780-1810 in China)
- Sir Edward Tichborne-Doughty, 9th Bt (1782-1853)
- Sir James Francis Tichborne, 10th Bt (1784-1862)
- John Michael Tichborne (1788-1806), died at Vellore, near Madras, India
- George Tichborne (1789-1802)
- Roger Robert Tichborne (1792-1849) married Rebecca Nunez, no male issue

The Seven Daughters of Sir Henry Tichborne, 8th Bt and Anne (daughter of Sir Thomas Burke, 1st Bt)

- Eliza Anne Tichborne, married the 11th Baron Dormer
- Frances Catherine Tichborne, married 11th Baron Arundell of Wardour (3rd wife, married 1829, died 1836)
- Julia Tichborne, married firstly (1830) Charles Talbot, secondly Washington Hibbert. The granddaughter of Julia and Charles Talbot, Gwendolyn Petre married Sir Henry Doughty-Tichborne, 12th Baronet
- Mary Tichborne, died 1827
- Catherine Caroline Tichborne, married William Greenwood
- Lucy Ellen Tichborne, married Colonel John Towneley
- Emily Blanche Tichborne, married firstly John Bennett, secondly Matthew Higgins

The Tichborne baronetcy became extinct in 1968 for lack of male-line descendants.

== Media ==
The Dole was the subject of a 1926 silent movie, The Legend of Tichborne Dole, written by George Banfield and directed by Hugh Croise. It is also the subject of 1671 painting; entitled The Tichborne Dole by Gillis van Tilborch. The dole, and the Tichborne family, feature prominently in the novel The Fraud by Zadie Smith.
