= Blacktown Hospital =

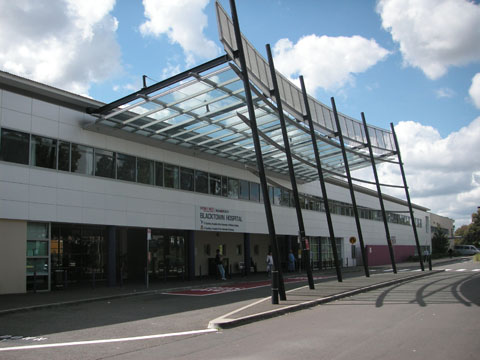

Geography
- Location: 18 Blacktown Road, Blacktown, New South Wales, Australia
- Coordinates: 33.7756°S 150.9175°E

Organisation
- Care system: Medicare (Australia)
- Type: General; Teaching
- Affiliated university: University of Wollongong; Australian Catholic University; University of Sydney; Western Sydney University
- Network: NSW Health

Services
- Emergency department: Yes
- Beds: 570

Helipads
- Helipad: <--

History
- Founded: 1965; 61 years ago

Links
- Website: wslhd.health.nsw.gov.au/Blacktown-and-Mt-Druitt-Hospital

Blacktown Hospital is a university teaching hospital in Blacktown, New South Wales, Australia, about 34 kilometres from the Sydney CBD. Together with Mount Druitt Hospital and associated community health centres, it is a part of the Western Sydney Local Health District (WSLHD). The hospital is located in one of the fastest population growth areas in NSW, caring for patients from highly diverse cultural and social-economic status backgrounds.

== Services ==
Blacktown Hospital provides a wide range of health services including:

- Acute Medical
- Ante-Natal Unit
- Coronary Care and Coronary Stepdown Unit
- Centre for Chronic & Complex Care Research
- Diabetes Center
- Acute Rehabilitation
- Acute Stroke Unit
- Bariatric Surgery
- Cardiology
- Colorectal Surgery
- Community Health Services including Dental
- Day Procedure Unit
- Delivery Suite
- Emergency Department
- Endoscopy Unit
- General Surgery
- Gynaecology
- High Dependency
- Intensive Care Unit
- Medical Oncology Services
- Mental Health
- Orthopaedic Surgery
- Pre-Admission Clinic
- Post-Natal Care
- Radiation Oncology
- Regional Dialysis Centre
- Special Care Nursery
- Surgical/Medical Short Stay Unit
- Urological Surgery

It operates a 24-hour emergency department and a full Intensive Care Unit and CCU. It also has 24-hour medical imaging and pathology services on site.

The hospital is a teaching hospital of the Western Sydney University's Blacktown/Mount Druitt Clinical School. Other affiliated universities include the University of Wollongong, University of Technology Sydney, University of Notre Dame Australia, Australian Catholic University and University of Sydney.

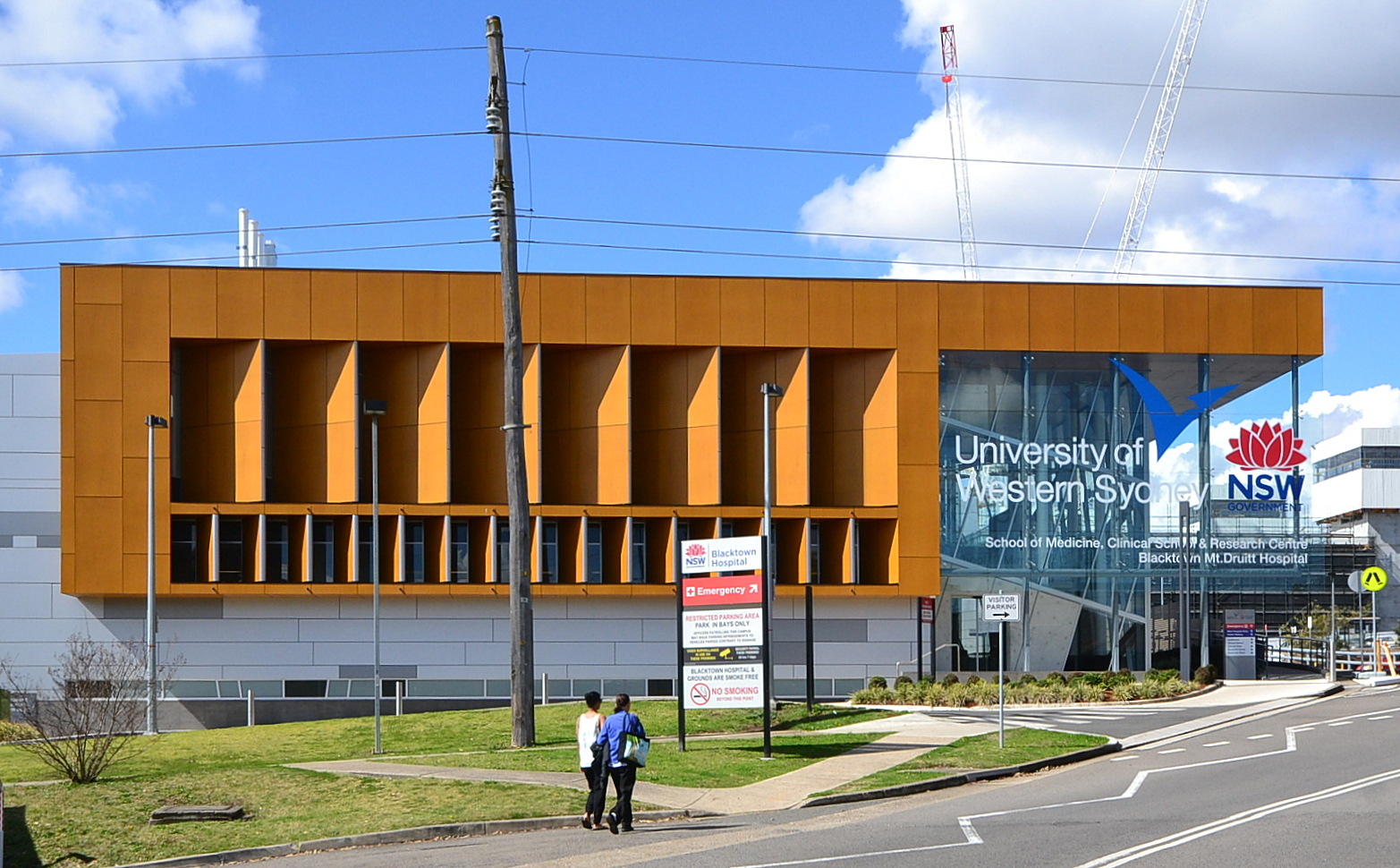
Blacktown/Mount Druitt Clinical School

The hospital also includes Bungarribee House, a psychiatric unit that, along with Cumberland Hospital provides mental health services to Western Sydney. The hospital's sub–acute mental health care facility, called the Melaleuca Unit, opened in 2014.

== History ==
In September 1956, a public meeting was held to discuss the need for a hospital in the town. Following petitions to the State health department for a facility, tenders were called for the £1.5 million hospital in July 1961. The foundation stone was laid on 19 May 1963.

The original Blacktown District Hospital building was completed in January 1965 and "commenced rendering its service to the public on the 28th April, 1965". It was officially opened on 28 April 1965 by then NSW Health Minister Bill Sheahan. This building has since been demolished, but was located on the site of the current Building C (Clinical Services Building, 2016).

The original district hospital building was considered unique for its innovative design which included "Spanish style courtyards", high tech catering equipment and the only "single-storey, double corridor hospital in the world". It had a capacity of 152 beds.

Nurses were given strict dress code instructions before the opening, including no eye make-up and wearing a distinct shade of lipstick. Matron Erella Macaulay was made the first director of nursing after opening the first nursing school in Blacktown in 1964. In its first year, nurses helped deliver 500 babies.

The first executive officers included J.G.S Moffat (first Chairman of the Board of Directors), Anthony P. Suleau (first Chief Executive Officer), and Erella F. Macaulay (Matron).

A modern kiosk, medical superintendent's quarters and resident medical officers' quarters were added in 1965.

A Volunteer Service was established in 1969 following a meeting of the Hospital Auxiliary. Volunteer roles originally included cleaning thermometers, filing patient records, cleaning slides in Pathology, rolling bandages, collecting X-rays, counting tablets in Pharmacy, feeding patients, feeding babies for adoption, writing letters for patients, folding nappies, attending to flowers, and washing patients' hair.

A four-bed cardiac care unit opened in 1971.

A new Maternity Wing opened in 1976. This building is currently the Regional Dialysis Centre/Admin Building.

The first purpose-built birthing centre in NSW opened at the hospital in 1991 for low-risk mums-to-be with three birth rooms, all with en-suite. Beds had "pretty bedspreads", vertical drapes and plenty of light, and were designed to feel like a bedroom at home. Mothers-to-be were encouraged to wear their own nightgowns and use their own baby clothes, and partners and families were welcome. The first baby born in the unit was a baby boy weighing 4.22 kilos, to mother Marilyn Lentern and husband Paul. Sisters Sarah, Miriam and Bethany waited in the new lounge with their grandparents until they were beckoned in to the room to see their new brother. The Lenterns were presented with a basket of flowers, a photograph album and a bottle of champagne to celebrate the first birth in the centre.

A new hospital building was completed in 1999 to meet growing healthcare demand. It was designed by McConel Smith & Johnson.

The current General Manager is Mr Brad Ceely

=== Clinical Research ===
In January 2023, the hospital launched a new research centre, the Centre for Chronic & Complex Care Research, a collaborative, interdisciplinary research centre and joint initiative with the School of Nursing, University of Wollongong. The research centre is led by Professor Caleb Ferguson and focuses on delivery of clinical research and capacity building in nursing research in chronic care. The Centre is the home of the Western Sydney Clinical Frailty Registry, a long term clinical cohort study of older patients admitted to hospital. The clinical quality registry is Australia's first and only Frailty Registry. The Centre researches all aspects of chronic and complex care, including cardiovascular disease, stroke, transitional care, palliative care, frailty and digital health.

=== Expansion Project ===
In 2012, the NSW Government announced Blacktown & Mount Druitt Hospitals Expansion Project Stage 1. In the first stage of expansion, Blacktown Hospital projects included facilities for sub-acute mental health, more parking, infrastructure and service enhancements and a new clinical services building for cancer, cardiac, respiratory and aged care, with an extensive art and culture program. Stage 1 concluded with the opening of the new clinical services building in April 2016. The building was officially opened by the then Premier of NSW Mike Baird and then Minister for Health Jillian Skinner on 17 May 2016.

To date the project has won 14 awards for design, consultation, arts and culture, and innovation, including three International Academy for Design & Health World Congress Academy Awards for Best International Hospital Project under 40,000 square metres, Best Interior Design and its arts projects.

Stage 2 of the project is currently underway to deliver a new acute services building, car park expansion and further refurbishment.

The car park extension was officially opened by the then Premier of NSW Gladys Berejiklian on 8 February 2018. The car park was the first hospital car park in NSW with a red/green light parking guidance system. Construction of the acute services building commenced in 2017 and will be completed in 2019. The new acute services building will include facilities for emergency, operating theatres, intensive care, maternity, birthing, newborn health, and paediatrics. Further refurbishment of the existing 1999 hospital building will be completed in 2020 to provide expanded ambulatory care and other services. A new purpose built mental health facility is currently under construction on the Blacktown Hospital campus
