= Sir Henry Tichborne, 4th Baronet =

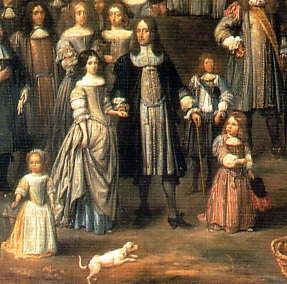
Sir Henry Joseph Tichborne as a boy (centre right) with his parents and family, c 1670

Sir Henry Joseph Tichborne (1655 – 15 July 1743) was the 4th Baronet of the Tichborne baronets. He inherited the title in 1689 on the death of his father.

He was born in about 1655 in Tichborne in Hampshire, the son of Sir Henry Tichborne the 3rd Baronet, and Mary née Arundell. His younger siblings were: John Hermengil Tichborne, Charles Tichborne, Winifred Tichborne, Lettice Tichborne, Mary Tichborne and Frances (Tichborne) Paston.

In 1689 he married Mary Kemp (1664–1754), the daughter of Anthony Kemp of Slindon in Sussex and with her had three sons: Henry, Henry-John and John, who all died unmarried and three daughters: Mary Agnes Tichborne (1695–1777) who married Michael Blount (1693–1739); Mabella Tichborne (1708–1727), who married Sir John Webb; and Frances Cecily Tichborne (1691–1763), who married George Brownlow Doughty.

He died in July 1743 in Tichborne, Hampshire without surviving male issue and was buried with his family in the church of St Andrew in the village. In his will, he left the manor at Leckford to his two surviving daughters: Mary Blount, by now a widow, and Frances Brownlow Doughty.

His younger brother Sir John Hermengil Tichborne, a Jesuit priest, succeeded to the title as the 5th Baronet. He died without a male heir on 5 May 1748 at Ghent, Belgium

Baronetage of England
| Preceded by Henry Tichborne | Baronet (of Tichborne); 1689–1743 | Succeeded by John Hermengil Tichborne |
