= Sir Henry Tichborne, 3rd Baronet =

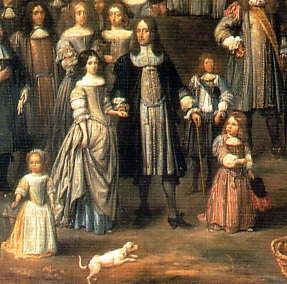
Sir Henry Tichborne and family, c. 1670

Sir Henry Tichborne, 3rd Baronet (c. 1624 – April 1689) was a Hampshire landowner and Roman Catholic baronet of the later Stuart period.

== Early life ==
He was the son of Sir Richard Tichborne, the second baronet (1578–1657), and Helen, his first wife and the daughter and co-heir of Robert White of Aldershot in Hampshire. He was baptized on 24 May 1624 at Winchester Cathedral. In 1654 in London Henry Tichborne married Mary Arundel (1622–1698), the daughter of Charles Arundell and Mary Browne. His bride was a granddaughter of Thomas, Lord Arundell of Wardour, a Catholic family.

The couple had four sons and five daughters, four of whom died in infancy. These included: Henry Joseph Tichborne, the 4th baronet; John and Charles Tichborne, who both died young; Winifred, who died as an infant; John Hermengil Tichborne, the 5th Baronet; Lettice, who married Henry Whettenhall; Mary, who became a nun; and Frances, who in 1694 married John Paston.

== Civil War and after ==
By the time of the Civil War Tichborne was old enough to fight, which he did on the Royalist side, and Tichborne family tradition identifies a hollow oak tree in which he hid after the Battle of Cheriton in 1644. He is believed to have been captured at sea in 1645 after fighting in Ireland and, after being imprisoned in the Tower of London, he was released in an exchange of prisoners. He succeeded to the baronetcy on his father's death in 1657 and inherited his father's considerable debts - said by his father in 1650 to have been £15,000. Henry Tichborne set about restoring the family's fortunes, and by the time of the Restoration in 1660, when he was included in a list of possible recipients of a proposed order of Knights of the Royal Oak, he had restored his income to about £1,000 a year.

== The Popish Plot ==
However, as prominent Catholics, he and his family came under suspicion as a result of the fictitious Popish Plot in 1678, and that year his house was besieged by a mob. Various allegations were made of strange behaviour in the Tichborne family chapel resulting in the Privy Council ordering that the chapel be searched for concealed weapons. Further, he was named by Titus Oates as having received a commission in a Catholic army supposedly being assembled by Pope Innocent XI. He was arrested and held in Winchester Castle together with the family priest before being imprisoned again in the Tower. Having recently visited Rome his friends were concerned that this might not look good and they burned his papers, including the history of the Tichborne family he had been writing. However, the situation calmed and he was released on bail in 1680.

== Later years ==
Charles II made him Lieutenant-General of the New Forest, while James II repaid Tichborne's loyalty by appointing him Lieutenant-General of the Ordnance (1687–1689). He was on the Commission of Peace for Hampshire in 1688 as part of James II's plan to appoint magistrates who would be tolerant of Catholics. However, Tichborne was probably already ill by this time and died in 1689 after, according to a letter of 1690: "a great while lingering, and doubtless made a happy end … knowing now so long that he was to dye". He was buried in St Peter's church in Tichborne in Hampshire.

He was succeeded as 4th Baronet by his son Henry Joseph Tichborne.

== The Tichborne Dole ==
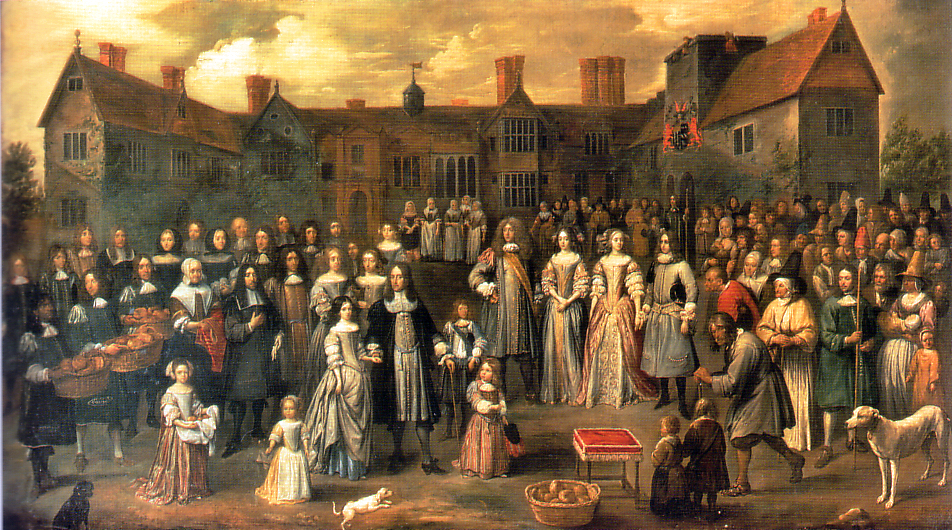
The Tichborne Dole (1671) by Gillis van Tilborch - Sir Henry Tichborne is depicted centre left with his wife and children

In recent years Sir Henry Tichborne has come to more prominent notice owing to his commission of and inclusion in the painting 'The Tichborne Dole' (1670) (right) by the Flemish artist Gillis van Tilborch after it was displayed in the 'Treasure Houses of Britain' exhibition in 1985. The 'Tichborne Dole' is a traditional English festival of charity which is held in the village of Tichborne, Hampshire, during the Feast of the Annunciation. The festival is centred on the handing out of donations of flour, which have been blessed by the local parish priest, from the front of Tichborne House.

The festival dates back to circa 1150 and was started by Lady Mabella Tichborne who, on her death bed, instructed that a donation of farm produce be made to the poor each year. Presently, the terms of the Dole stipulate that adults from the parishes of Tichborne and Cheriton are entitled to claim 1 gallon of flour, and children half a gallon each.

The painting 'The Tichborne Dole' depicts Sir Henry and his family together with his servants and family priest during the annual distribution of bread to the poor of Tichborne in Hampshire, probably in 1670/71. The portrait features Sir Henry and his family standing centre left in front of Tichborne House and it was perhaps intended to proclaim Sir Henry's successful rebuilding of the family fortunes after being left heavily in debt by his father, Sir Richard Tichborne, the 2nd Baronet as well as displaying the deeply religious family's attitude towards charity. The painting has been described as '...a document of social history [that] has no peer'. However, considering the trouble Sir Henry suffered as a result of his Catholic faith perhaps instead the painting should be viewed less in the context of a 'document of stark realism' than as a reminder of the social hierarchy of the time, and in particular of that of the place of the Catholic landed gentry in society.

Baronetage of England
Preceded by Richard Tichborne	Baronet (of Tichborne); 1657–1689	Succeeded by Henry Tichborne
