= Tichborne baronets =

English title from the 17th to 20th centuries

There have been two baronetcies created for persons with the surname Tichborne, both in the Baronetage of England. Both creations are extinct.

The Tichborne Baronetcy, of Tichborne in the County of Hampshire, was created in the Baronetage of England on 8 March 1621 for Sir Benjamin Tichborne, who was a Member of Parliament (MP) for Petersfield from 1588 to 1589 and for Hampshire in 1593. It became extinct at the death of the 14th baronet in 1968.

The Tichborne Baronetcy, of Beaulieu in County Louth, was created in the Baronetage of England on 12 July 1697 for Henry Tichborne, the great-grandson of Sir Benjamin. He was ennobled in 1715 as Baron Ferrard of Beaulieu, with which title the baronetcy then merged until its extinction in 1731. Lord Ferrard was son of Sir William Tichborne of Beaulieu, son of the statesman and general Sir Henry Tichborne, younger son of Sir Benjamin Tichborne, 1st Baronet.

Escutcheon of the Tichborne baronets (both lines)

== Background ==
The inheritance of the titles has been complicated, coming through two sons of Sir Benjamin, 1st Bt, Richard and Walter.

Sir Richard, 2nd Bt, eldest son of 1st Bt. He married Susan Waller and was succeeded by his son Sir Henry, 3rd Bt, who married Mary Arundell. He was succeeded by his son, Sir Henry 4th Bt, who married Mary Kemp. The 4th Bt had only daughters, so he was succeeded by his brother Sir John, 5th Bt, a Jesuit priest. One daughter of Sir Henry (4th Bt), Mary Agnes, married Michael Blount of Mapledurham.

The baronetcy reverted to descendants of Sir Benjamin's second son, Sir Walter Tichborne, Kt, of Aldershot. Sir Walter married Mary White by her inheriting land in Aldershot (the family had a home in Aldershot Park for many years before building a grander home at Manor Park where their descendants lived for nearly 200 years). His son Francis Tichborne married Susanna Hawes and their son White Tichborne, an MP, married, secondly, Anne Supple. White's son James Tichborne married Mary Rudyard (or Rudyerd), and their son Henry became the 6th Bt and married his fourth cousin, Mary Blount, daughter of Michael Blount and Mary Agnes Tichborne. Thus, later baronets are genealogically descended from both lines.

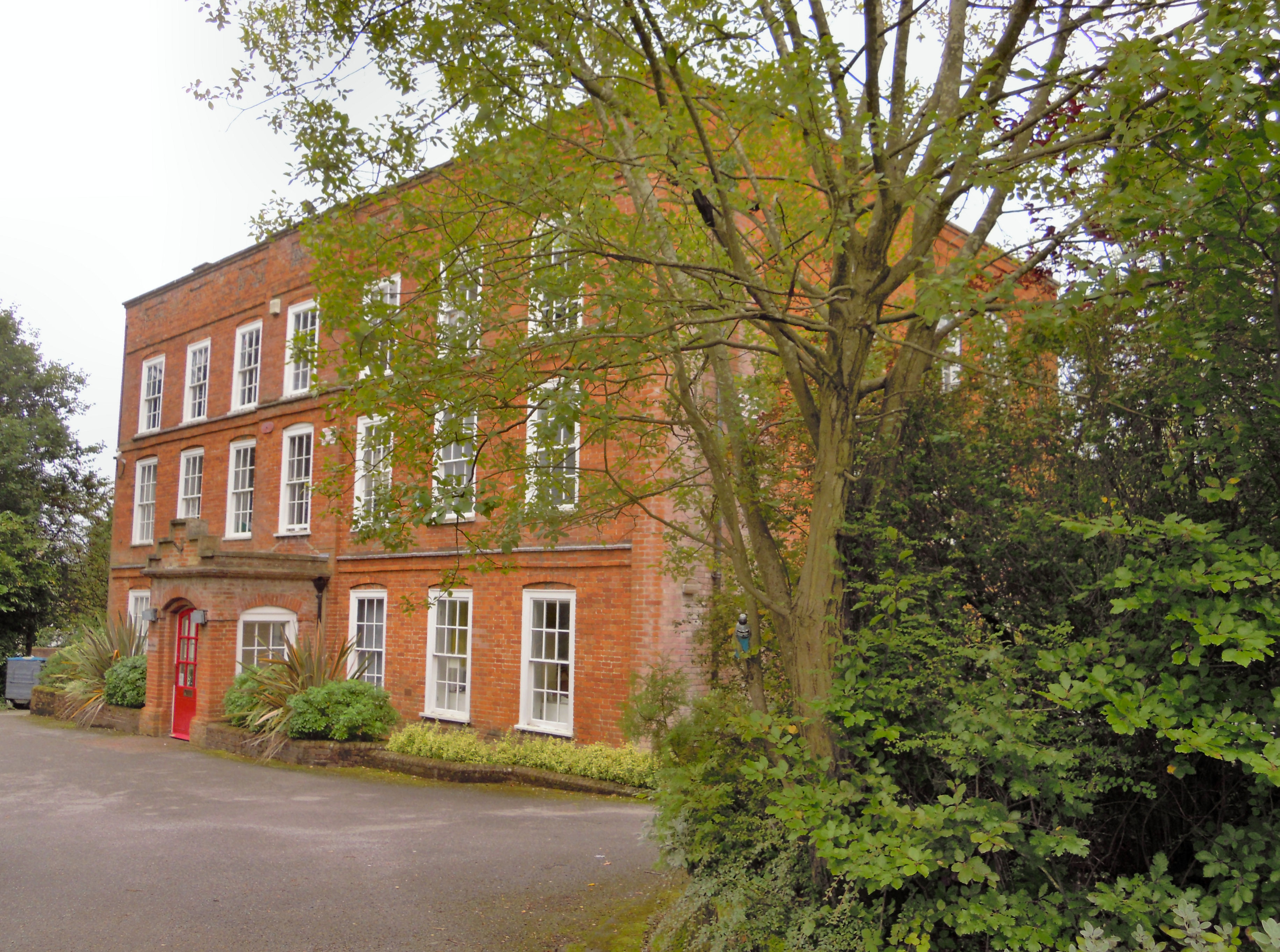
The former Tichborne Manor House

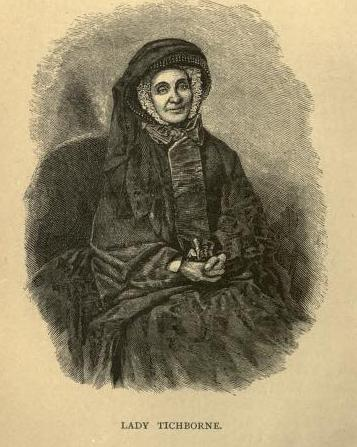
Lady Tichborne, Sir Roger Charles Tichborne's mother

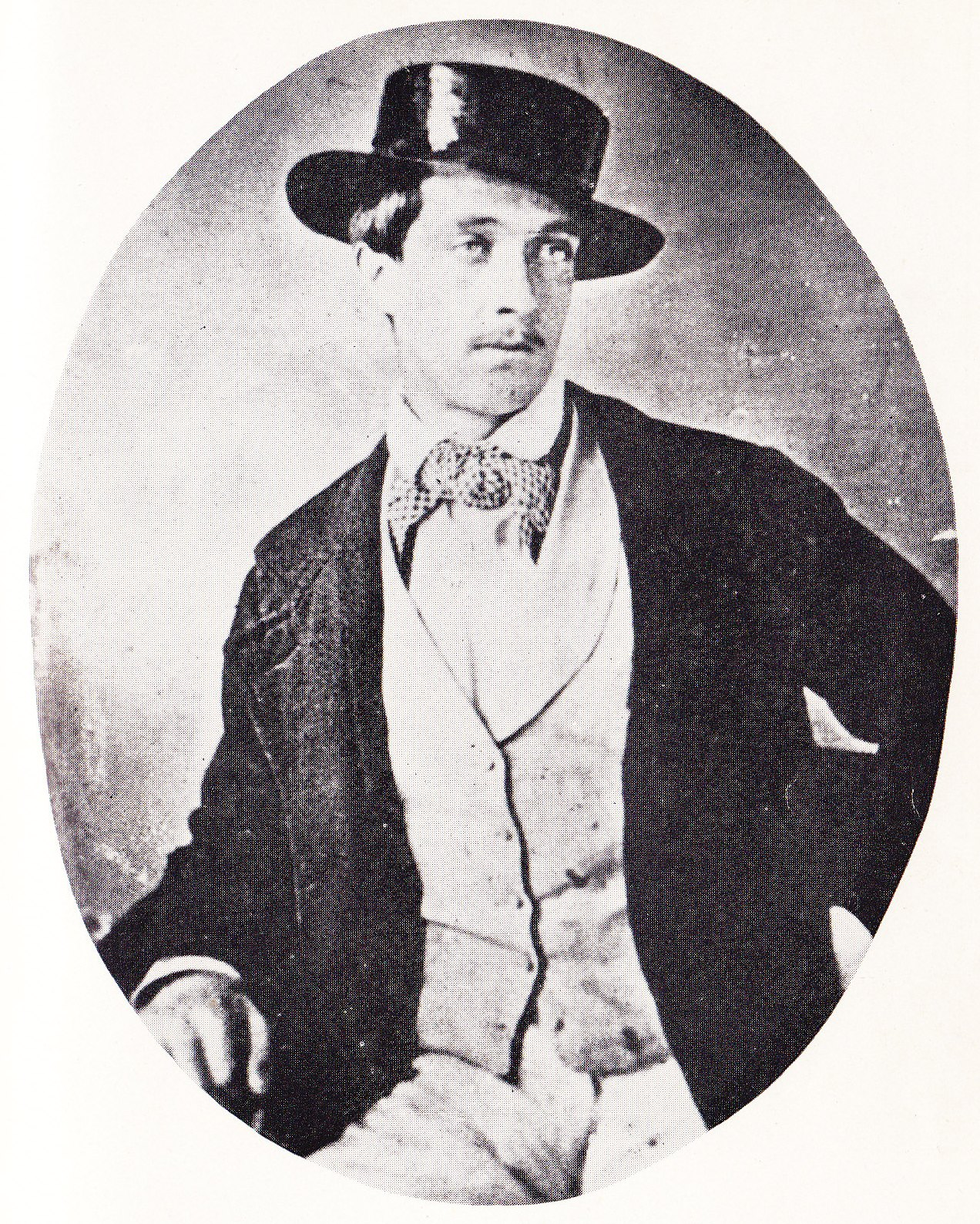
Roger Charles Tichborne: one of two daguerrotypes taken in South America in 1853–54

Sir Henry's son, Sir Henry, 7th Bt, married Elizabeth Plowden, and they had seven sons. Their eldest son, Sir Henry, 8th Bt, married Anne Burke, and they had seven daughters and no sons. The 8th Bt was succeeded by his brother Edward, who had taken the name Doughty and, on becoming 9th Bt, assumed the name Sir Edward Tichborne-Doughty. He married Katherine Arundell, and his son died as a child, so he was succeeded by his brother Sir James Tichborne, 10th Bt, who married Henriette Felicite Seymour.

Following the disappearance in 1854 of Roger Charles Tichborne, the heir to the title of the 10th Baronet, the appearance in 1866 of a claimant led to a highly publicised legal battle known as the Tichborne Case, at the end of which the claimant was declared an impostor. In 1866, the wealth of the 11th Baronet included Tichborne Park's 2,290 acres (930 ha), manors, lands and farms in Hampshire, and considerable properties in London and elsewhere, which altogether produced an annual income of over £20,000, equivalent to several millions in 21st-century terms.

Sir Alfred, the 11th Bt, was the younger son of Sir James, 10th Bt. He married Theresa Arundell and died young, leaving his wife pregnant. Theresa gave birth shortly afterwards to Sir Henry, 12th Bt. Sir Henry married Gwendolyne Petre, whose grandmother was Julia Tichborne, one of the seven daughters of the 8th Bt. Their only child, Sir Joseph Doughty-Tichborne, 13th Bt, married Denise Greville. Their only child, Sir Anthony Doughty-Tichborne, 14th Bt, married Antonia Snagge. Having three daughters, a son who died in infancy, and no surviving heirs in the male line from Sir Benjamin, 1st Bt, Sir Anthony was the last Baronet: the baronetcy became extinct upon his death in 1968.

== Tichborne baronets, of Tichborne (1621) ==
- Sir Benjamin Tichborne, 1st Baronet (c. 1540 – 6 September 1629), MP for Petersfield 1588–1589 and Hampshire 1593
- Sir Richard Tichborne, 2nd Baronet (c. 1578 – April 1652), MP for Lyme Regis 1597–1598, Hampshire 1614 and Winchester 1621–1629
- Sir Henry Tichborne, 3rd Baronet (c. 1624 – Apr 1689)
- Sir Henry Joseph Tichborne, 4th Baronet (c. 1655 – 15 July 1743)
- Sir John Hermengild Tichborne, 5th Baronet (1679 – 5 May 1748)
- Sir Henry Tichborne, 6th Baronet (14 October 1710 – 16 July 1785)
- Sir Henry Tichborne, 7th Baronet (6 September 1756 – 14 June 1821)
- Sir Henry Tichborne, 8th Baronet (8 January 1779 – 3 June 1845)
- Sir Edward Doughty, 9th Baronet (27 March 1782 – 5 March 1853)
- Sir James Francis Doughty-Tichborne, 10th Baronet (3 October 1784 – 11 June 1862)
- Sir Alfred Joseph Doughty-Tichborne, 11th Baronet (4 September 1839 – 22 February 1866)
- Sir Henry Alfred Joseph Doughty-Tichborne, 12th Baronet (28 May 1866 – 27 July 1910)
- Sir Joseph Henry Bernard Doughty-Tichborne, 13th Baronet (18 January 1890 – 23 October 1930)
- Sir Anthony Joseph Henry Doughty Doughty-Tichborne, 14th Baronet (29 June 1914 – 18 July 1968)

See also Tichborne case, for a legal case in which a claimant said that he was Roger Tichborne, who, if he had not been lost at sea, would have been the 11th Baronet.

See also Tichborne Dole.
