= Charlie Ottley =

British journalist, TV presenter, and filmmaker

Charlie Ottley (born 17 July 1971) is a British journalist, TV presenter, poet, and filmmaker. He gained fame by creating travel documentaries about Romania's natural landscapes, such as "Wild Carpathia" (2011) and "Flavours of Romania" (2017). Acknowledging his efforts in promoting culture and tourism, the Romanian government honoured him with The Cultural Merit Order in 2021.

== Early life and education ==
Ottley was born and raised in Tichborne, Hampshire, England, on 17 July 1971. He studied philosophy and theology at the Bristol University. He attended journalism courses at City, University of London.

== Career ==
=== Journalism ===
In 1996, starting as a news and feature writer, Ottley became a news-feed editor and later, a Hollywood correspondent for the World Entertainment News Network working from Los Angeles, US. In 1997, he returned to the UK and opted for poetry and column writing. He made regular appearances on BBC's programs; BBC Radio 5 Live, The Today Programme, Saturday Live, and The Daily Politics. He also served as a freelance writer for the ITV, Channel 4, and World Online.

He penned a weekly column under the title of "Weekender" for The Daily Express, which he later in 2000, recreated and co-produced as a TV series for The Travel Channel. After that, he launched a food and travel series "Flavours Of Chile" on the same TV channel for the next twelve years, expanding it to 'flavours of' several other countries.

Ottley continues to be a freelance journalist and contributor for the BBC, The Daily Mail, Food and Travel Magazine, Daily Express, and other media.

=== Tourism ===
In 2011, Ottley produced a travel documentary about Romania's historical and tourist sites, Wild Carpathia, for the Travel Channel. The documentary, also featuring Prince Charles, was broadcast around the world in 110 countries and translated into 11 languages. In 2017, Ottley presented episode 4 of Wild Carpathia to 193 member state representatives and 400 VIPs at the United Nations Headquarters in New York. The final episode of the documentary came in 2019. Wild Carpathia was recognized as the "Best Documentary 2020" at the Alpin Film Festival in Brașov, Romania.

Ottley scripted, presented, produced, and directed another nine-part series, Flavours Of Romania for the Romanian National Television in 2017. Later, it was also aired on Romanian channels Digi 24, Digi World, Digi Life, TVR International, and Kanal D. It was one of the most-watched films on Netflix.

In 2020, Ottley wrote, edited, and narrated four short films for BBC to promote tourism in Romania. In June 2020, following Romania's post-Covid opening up, he produced and edited a five-minute documentary along with Prince Charles to support domestic tourism.

In July 2020, Charlie collaborated with Brașov's city and county councils to produce four new films for BBC World News to promote the cultures of Brașov and Transylvania. In December 2021, he made a documentary about Danube Delta that was aired on Digi24 on Romania's national day.

He has also worked with The European Nature Trust (see [theeuropeannaturetrust.com homepage]) to protect Romania's environment, forests, and mountains.

Ottley was made an honorary citizen of Brașov in September 2020.

== Personal life ==
Ottley is married to Oana Mihai. He moved to Romania and bought a house in Brașov County in 2021. He became a Romanian citizen in 2025.

== Documentaries ==
- Wild Carpathia (2011-2013)
- Flavours of Colombia (2012)
- Flavours of Romania (2017)
- Wild Danube (2021)

== Books ==
- Cautionary Verses & Ruthless Rhymes for Modern Times (2006), published by Constable & Robinson.

== Awards and honours ==
Ottley has received:

- The Royal Decoration of the Cross of the Romanian Royal House for the documentary "Wild Carpathia" in 2018.
- Best Promotion For Romania Abroad from the Romania-Insider Award in 2018.
- Best Initiative in Journalism and Marketing from the Romania Top Hotel Awards.
- The Cultural Merit Order, decorated by the president Klaus Iohannis in January 2021, for the promotion of Romanian culture.
