= William Cresswell (Tichborne case) =

Australian criminal

William Cresswell (c. 1829 – 12 December 1904) (Note: Cresswell was described as 'nearly 71 years of age' in 1899. He died in 1904.) was an inmate of the Parramatta Lunatic Asylum, in New South Wales who was considered as a claimant in the Tichborne case.

== The first mentions ==
The first public mentions of William Cresswell in relation to the Tichborne case appear in news reports from 1871. Arthur Orton was said to have associated 'with a man well known in the Queanbeyan district' under that name, and that 'the last that was heard of him is that he was sent... to the Gladesville Mental Hospital as a dangerous lunatic'. Further, 'It was said there was always something mysterious about Cresswell, and even his wife was not acquainted with his previous history'.

In April 1884, Daniel Smith 'agent for the Tichborne Release association' was reported to have tried to secure the release of William Cresswell from the Parramatta Lunatic Asylum 'in order to take him to England under the supposition that he is the very identical Arthur Orton'. In later reports it emerged that Cresswell was being promoted not as Arthur Orton, but as Tichborne himself:

"This person is stated to have a cut over the eye-brow, received on the Pauline from an albatross, mark of a fishhook through the eyelid, indenture in the back of the head, and to correspond in age and height to the real Sir Roger Tichbourne. The person is further described as a Roman Catholic, and has a sacred relic in his possession when admitted. He has a peculiar twitching of the eye- brows, odd ears, speaks French, repeatedly talks of his estates in Hampshire and Dorsetshire."

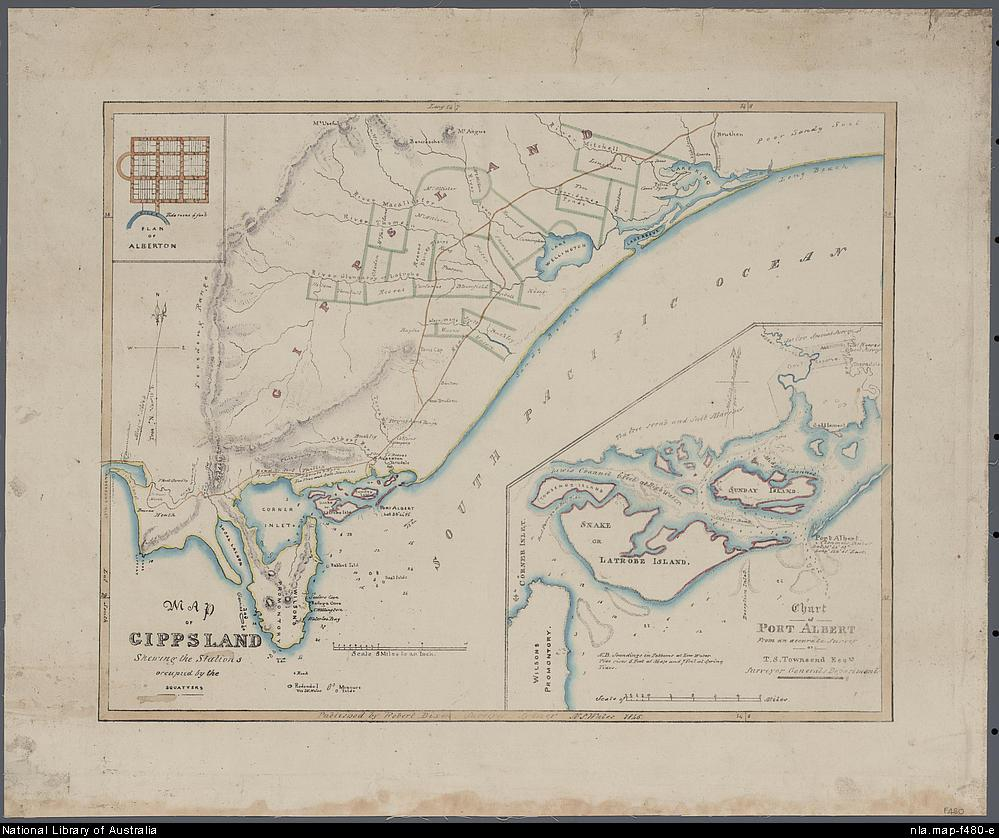
19th century map showing squatting runs in Gippsland where Cresswell is said to have known Arthur Orton.

Cresswell's candidacy was advanced by Sydney lawyer Edward Priestman acting for Rev. Edward Williams, 'a Catholic priest of Sydenmouth, Devonshire (England)'. Priestman found early support in a Victorian Member of Parliament, J.H. Graves, who knew of a detailed story of how Orton and Tichborne (Cresswell) had first met when both working on Gippsland squatting runs. Another source, 'an old resident' Richard Bennison, a Gippsland hotelier, confirmed some of Graves' story in 1895, as he recalled Orton and 'George Smith' newly arrived from Tasmania (and still had hotel records of their visit) and that, around the time Orton assumed the alias Tom Castro, Bennison encountered Smith again, who gave his name as William Cresswell.

In 1897, permission was sought from the Supreme Court to examine Cresswell to determine if 'marks on his body' matched Tichborne's. The process was thorough and:

"Creswell appeared more intelligent than on the previous occasions when he was examined, and did everything he was requested without the slightest demur, though he showed no emotion and did not express any desire to know the reason for the examination. Photographs were taken of him in eight or nine different positions, and he submitted to the ordeal with perfect quietness and indifference."

While the evidence was not entirely conclusive, a news report of the time noted that 'Where the famous tattoo mark was, on the left forearm, there is a scar, consistent with theory that it was destroyed by searing'.

== 1898 Royal Commission ==
The following year, at a Royal Commission 'appointed with reference to the identity of William Cresswell', a witness Bridget Wivas said that while she was a servant at a house in Woollahra, Sydney, a male servant employed there resembled Tichborne, in marks, accent, and details he gave of his life, and she believed that man was still in the city. Walter Lee, a labourer, recalled his own encounter with the man he believed to be Tichborne, when he crewed with him on the 'Osprey' between Adelaide and Geelong in 1854. While an attendant at the asylum from 1869–1871 gave testimony that Cresswell had once remarked 'I'm like the Prodigal Son; but I'll never return'.

Cresswell was questioned by the Royal Commission, and was described as a 'grey, robust looking old man'. At times he 'expressed recognition' of people and places, even stamping his feet 'with anger' when he was displeased, but he also 'talked incoherently to himself' during the proceedings. When commissioner Wilkes mentioned the names of Cresswell, Sir Roger Tichborne and Arthur Orton, asking if they were three separate men, Cresswell responded: 'Don't mix my name up with such people'.

Cresswell maintained that he was not Tichborne, and the Commission agreed, with one dissenting opinion, but it did find that he was 'of sufficiently sound mind to warrant his release from the Asylum'.

== Aftermath ==
While the New South Wales Legislative Assembly supported the Commission's call for Cresswell's release, in 1902, during a visit by a journalist, he was still an inmate at the asylum, and he remained there until his death in 1904.

One of those who offered evidence to the Royal Commission into Cresswell's identity, Catholic priest Rev. Father Dunne of Albury, offered a completely different suggestion. He repeated his recollections, first made public in 1895, that he had given the last rites to Sir Roger Tichborne in Geelong, Victoria, in 1854.
