= Civil prisoner =

In English law, a civil prisoner is a person who has been imprisoned for an offence that is not a crime.

According to the Prison Reform Trust website, persons who do not pay child support or other legally due money may be civilly imprisoned.

== History ==
Civil imprisonment is much less common in the 21st century than in the past.

Under New York law, insolvent debtors who filed for bankruptcy were able to avoid civil imprisonment, as of 1905.
