= Tichborne =

Village and parish in Hampshire, England

Coordinates: 51°04′12″N 1°11′13″W

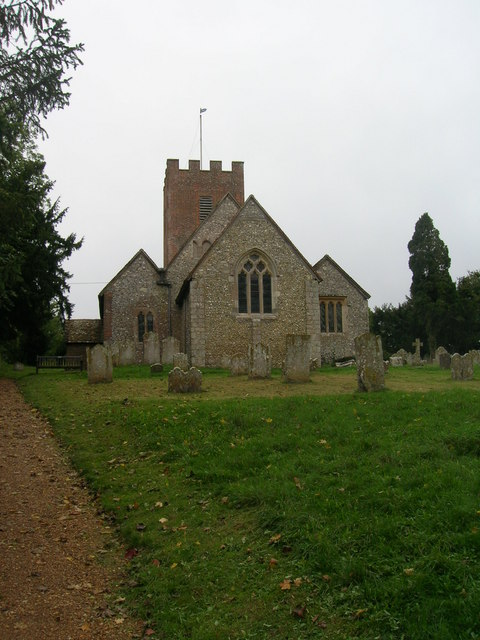
- St. Andrew's parish church

- Location within Hampshire
- Population: 168 (2001 Census); 167 (2011 Census)
- OS grid reference: SU5730
- Civil parish: Tichborne
- District: City of Winchester
- Shire county: Hampshire
- Region: South East
- Country: England
- Sovereign state: United Kingdom
- Post town: Alresford
- Postcode district: SO24
- Dialling code: 01962
- Police: Hampshire and Isle of Wight
- Fire: Hampshire and Isle of Wight
- Ambulance: South Central
- UK Parliament: Winchester

Tichborne is a village and civil parish 4 miles (6.4 km) east of Winchester in Hampshire, England.

== History ==
In archaeology in the south of the parish within the South Downs National Park is a bell barrow, bowl barrow and regular aggregate field system immediately east of Ganderdown Farm, a Scheduled Ancient Monument indicating Bronze Age inhabitation.

=== Manor ===
In AD 909 Edward the Elder granted the manor of Tichborne to Denewulf, Bishop of Winchester. However, Tichborne is not recorded in the Domesday Book of 1086.

The Roman Catholic Tichborne family has held the manor since the 12th century. Tichborne House was built shortly after 1803 while a longstanding baronetcy (indicating the use of 'Sir') was held by the family. There was a notorious 19th-century legal case of the Tichborne Claimant, in which an English imposter, Arthur Orton, then living in Australia, claimed to be missing Tichborne family member Sir Roger Tichborne.

=== Other buildings ===
Almost all of the other buildings are clustered near each other and are listed buildings. They include an Old Rectory, which may indicate chancel repair liability, the Chapel of St Margaret and Tichborne Park House. Near Cheriton is the only Grade II* listed building, Sevington Farmhouse. 1 mile (1.6 km) east of Alresford are a northern small street of cottages, Lady Croft Cottages and Seward's Bridge over the River Itchen and Watercress Line railway.

== Parish church ==
The Church of England parish church of Saint Andrew has an 11th-century Saxo-Norman chancel that combines characteristically Saxon double-splayed windows with Norman flat buttresses and has reached Grade I listed status.

The nave and two-bay arcades are Early English Gothic.

The north aisle is now railed off to form the Tichborne Chapel, with monuments to members of the manorial family Inside the chapel is a tomb with full-sized horizontal images of Sir Benjamin Tichborne (d.1621) and his wife Amphillis.

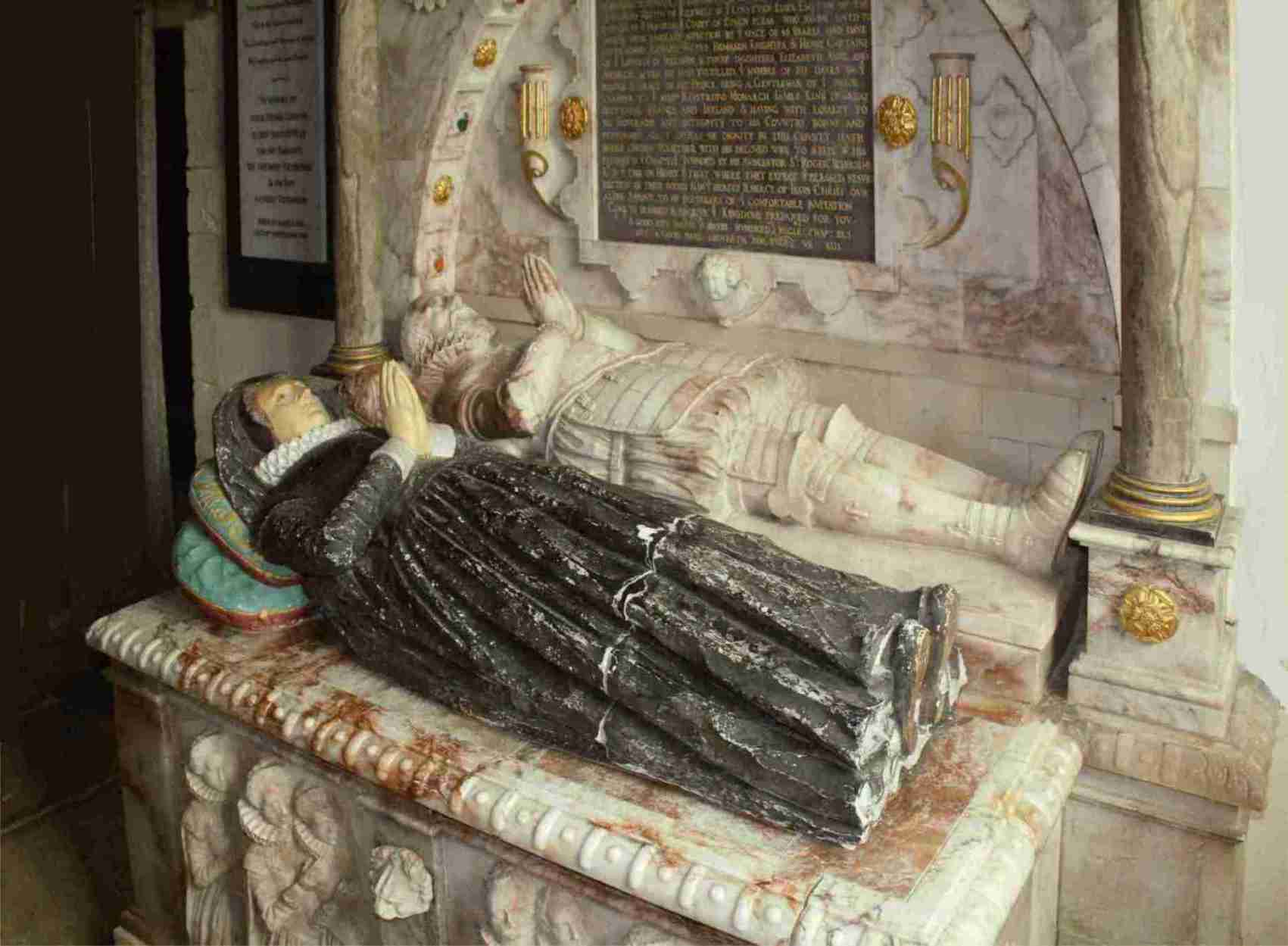
Tichborne church grave of Amphillis and Sir Benjamin Tichborne

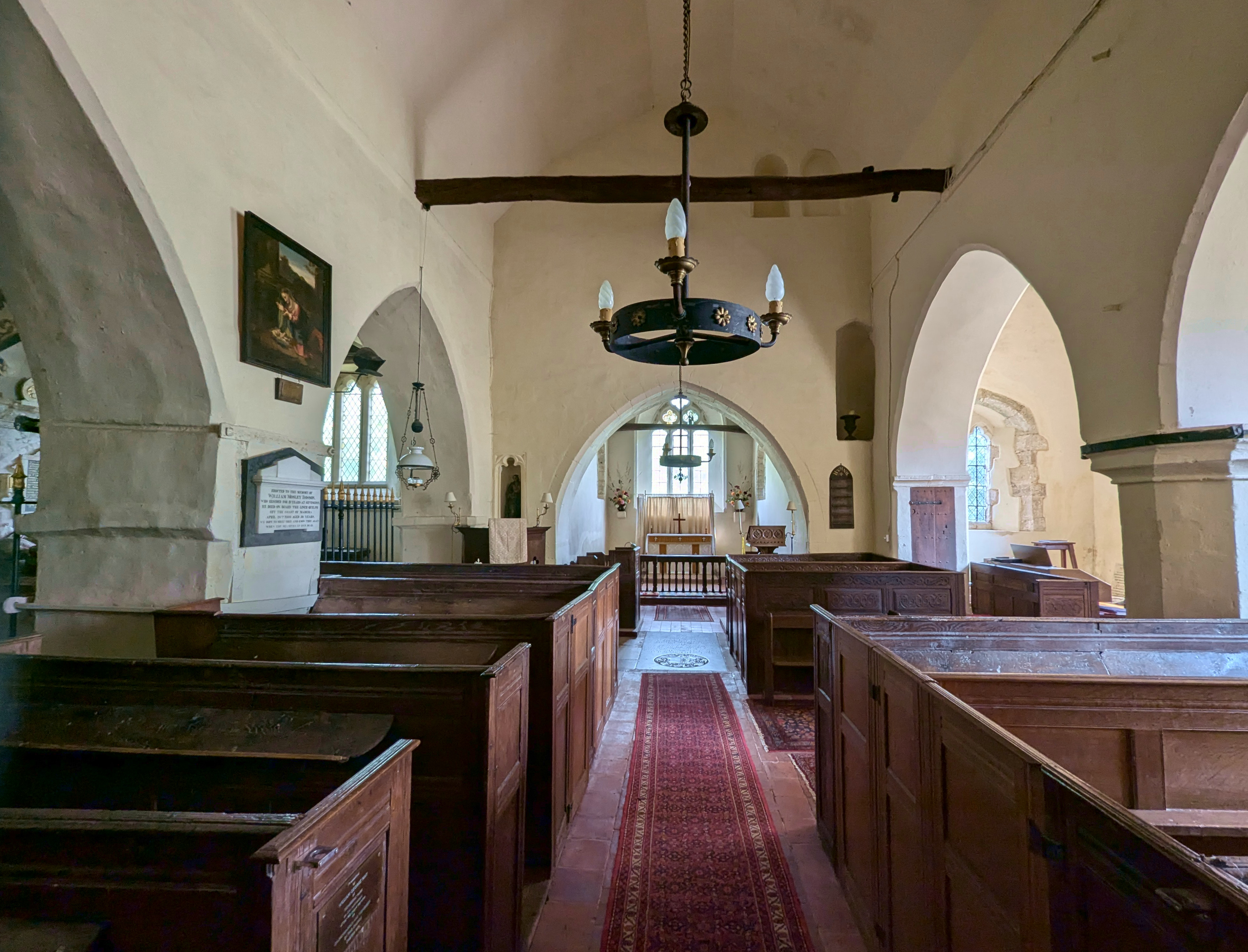
The nave and chancel of St. Andrew's church, at Tichborne, Hampshire, England. September 2024.

It is rare in being dedicated as a Roman Catholic chapel within a pre-Reformation Anglican Parish Church.

The west tower was added in 1703 and is built of blue and red brick. It has a ring of six bells cast between 1737 and 1887.

== Amenities ==
Tichborne holds a traditional charitable festival called the Tichborne Dole.

On the main village street, on the north side of the village is the Tichborne Arms pub

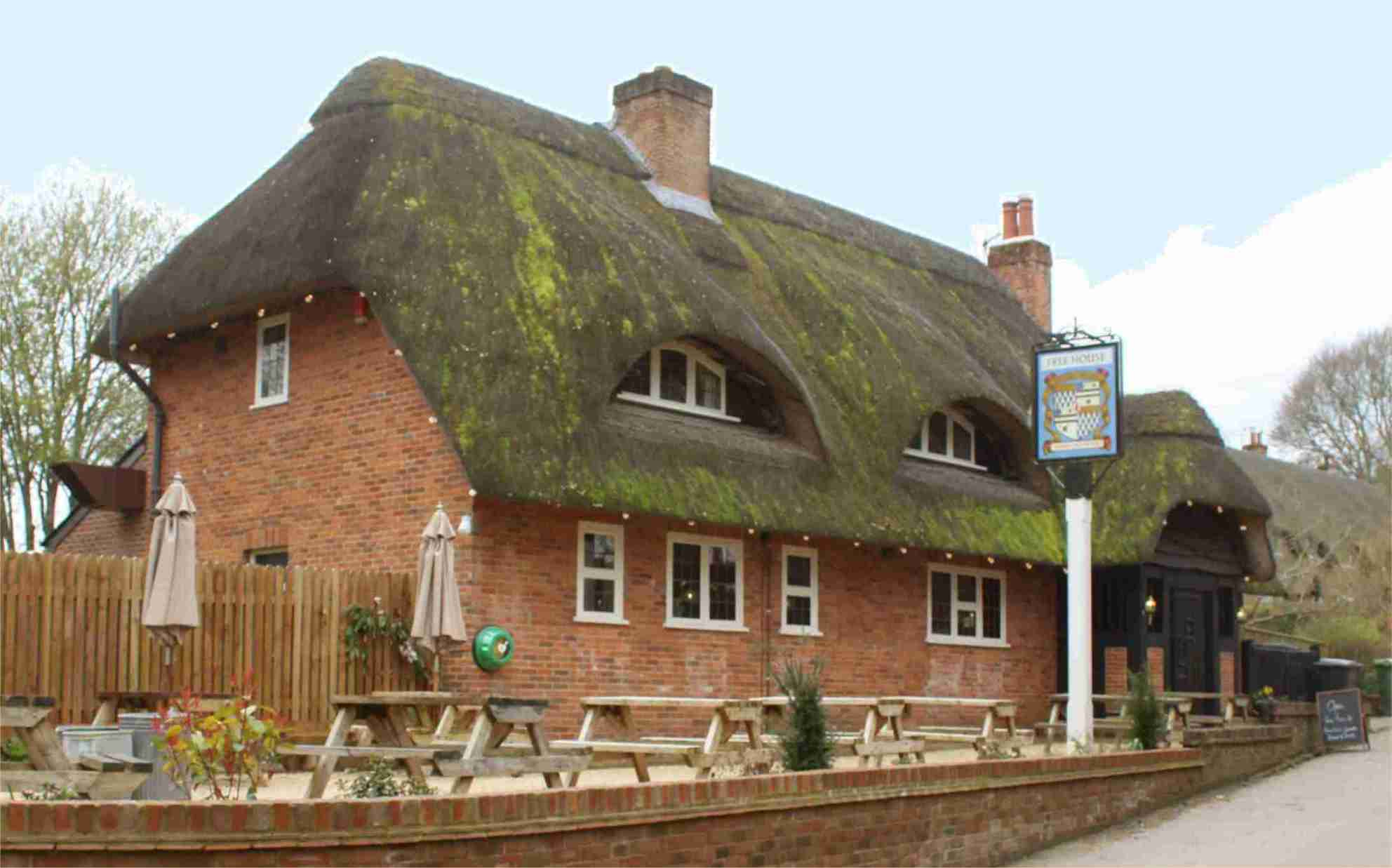
Tichborne Arms

Alresford Golf Course, founded 1890, covers much of the north-east, with greens highly rated on golfing websites.

Nearby attractions include the National Trust garden at Hinton Ampner.

In September is the large agricultural and funfair Alresford Show at Tichborne Park.

== Notable people ==
- Matilda Ellen Bishop (1842–1913), first Principal of Royal Holloway, University of London
- Sandy Brown (born 1946), ceramics artist
- James Lillywhite (cricketer, born 1793)
- Bryan Michie (1906–1971), producer and broadcaster
- Charlie Ottley (born 1971), journalist and broadcaster

== Sources ==
- Page, W.H., ed. (1908). A History of the County of Hampshire, Volume 3. Victoria County History. pp. 336–338.
- Pevsner, Nikolaus; Lloyd, David (1967). Hampshire and the Isle of Wight. The Buildings of England. Harmondsworth: Penguin Books. pp. 621–622.
