= Feel Free =

Feel Free may refer to:

- Feel Free (Laird book), a 2018 book of poems by Nick Laird
- Feel Free (Smith book), a 2018 book of essays by Zadie Smith
- Feel Free (album), a 1996 album by Welsh musician Mike Peters
- "Feel Free", a 2025 song by Zach McPhee
