= White Teeth (TV serial) =

2002 British TV drama series

- DVD cover
- Genre: Drama, comedy
- Written by: Simon Burke; Zadie Smith
- Directed by: Julian Jarrold
- Starring: Om Puri; Phil Davis; Naomie Harris; Archie Panjabi
- Composer: Adrian Johnston
- Country of origin: United Kingdom
- Original language: English
- No. of series: 1
- No. of episodes: 4 (list of episodes)

Production
- Executive producers: Rebecca Eaton; George Faber; Suzan Harrison; Charles Pattinson
- Producer: Nicolas Brown
- Production locations: London, United Kingdom, India, Jamaica
- Cinematography: David Odd
- Editor: Andrew Hulme
- Running time: 50 minutes
- Production companies: Company Pictures; Channel 4 Television Corporation

Original release
- Network: Channel 4
- Release: 17 September – 8 October 2002

White Teeth is a 2002 British four-part drama TV serial based on the 2000 novel of the same name written by Zadie Smith.

The series was directed by Julian Jarrold, adapted by Simon Burke, and stars Om Puri and Phil Davis. It was broadcast by Channel 4 over four consecutive weeks between 17 September 2002 and 8 October 2002.

== Overview ==
White Teeth consists of four self-contained short-stories, focusing on a major male character as he encounters a turning point in his life, with background cameos from other characters. The series spans 20 years of three cultures, chronicling the interlinked stories of three families over three generations in a multicultural area of north-west London from 1974 to 1992.

The four-hour saga also features leaps back to the Second World War, where Samad and Archie served together, and even further back to the 1857 Indian Mutiny.

== Cast ==
=== Main cast ===
- Om Puri as Samad Miah Iqbal
- Phil Davis as Archie Jones
- Naomie Harris as Clara Bowden/Jones
- Archie Panjabi as Alsana Begum/Iqbal
- Geraldine James as Joyce Malfen
- Robert Bathurst as Marcus Malfen
- Christopher Simpson as Magid Iqbal/Millat Iqbal
- Sarah Ozeke as Irie Jones
- James McAvoy as Josh Malfen

=== Recurring cast ===
- Mona Hammond as Hortense Bowden
- Kammy Darweish as Ardashir
- Charlie Creed-Miles as Ryan Topps
- Maggie O'Neill as Poppy Burt-Jones
- Deepak Verma as Shiva
- Jeff Mirza as Mohammed Ishmael
- Nina Wadia as Neena
- Sophie Winkleman as Joely
- Rufus Jones as Crispin
- Chu Omambala as Brother Ibrahim
- Jacob Scipio as Young Magid Iqbal/Millat Iqbal

=== Guest cast ===
- John Simm as Mr Hero
- Russell Brand as Merlin
- Vernon Dobtcheff as Devil of Dachau

== Episodes ==
No.	Title	Original release date
1	"The Peculiar Second Marriage of Archie Jones"	17 September 2002
In 1974, recently divorced Archie Jones (Phil Davis) is one of life's losers, with a dead end job. He makes important life decisions on the toss of a coin. Archie's old war comrade, Samad Miah Iqbal (Om Puri) returns to fulfil an arranged marriage to a woman half his age, Alsana (Archie Panjabi). After being unable to find work, Samad reluctantly asks his cousin, Ardashir (Kammy Darweish), for a job in his restaurant, Curry Heaven. Meanwhile, Jamaican-born Clara Bowden (Naomie Harris), with the encouragement of her Jehovah's Witness mother, Hortense (Mona Hammond), proselytises door-to-door about the end of the world. When she meets Ryan Topps (Charlie Creed-Miles), she loses her virginity and abandons her religion, and after an encounter with a commune takes up his rebellious ways. After Ryan and Clara have an accident in Ryan's scooter, Ryan himself becomes a believer. Merlin (Russell Brand) from the commune takes Clara from hospital to the End of the World party. Lonely and depressed, Archie's attempts suicide on New Year's Eve, though his plan is thwarted by butcher, Mo (Jeff Mirza). By chance, Archie meets Clara at the End of the World party, and they kiss at the stroke of midnight. Clara leaves home after Hortense disowns her. Archie's boss, Mr Hero (John Simm), raises concerns over racial tension arising if Archie brings his new fiancée to the company dinner. Archie and Clara then get married, and during Samad's best man's speech he reveals that during World War II Archie executed a Nazi war criminal, the Devil of Dachau.
2	"The Temptation of Samad Iqbal"	24 September 2002
In 1984, Samad works as a waiter in his cousin's restaurant and is forced to sleep in the loft by his feisty wife, Alsana, who is on sex-strike. After Samad meets Poppy Burt-Jones (Maggie O'Neill), his twin sons' teacher, on his way to a PTA meeting, a frustrated Samad embarks on a passionate, adulterous affair. Meanwhile, Millat, Magid, Josh and Irie deliver their harvest festival offerings. To make amends Samad tries to save his sons from the corruption of the West, however, he can only afford to send one of them to Bangladesh for a proper education in the old ways. He has to choose between pompous, know-it-all Magid, or idle, good-for-nothing Millat. Samad thinks Millat would benefit the most, however, after he finds out Magid saw him kissing Poppy, with Archie's help, he sends Magid to Bangladesh instead.
3	"The Trouble with Millat"	1 October 2002
In 1992, Millat (Christopher Simpson) is a 17-year-old, attractive, streetwise, drug-dealer, who is idolised by Archie's diffident daughter Irie, who is in turn adored by nerdy Josh Malfen (James McAvoy). When all three are caught with a joint at school, their punishment is study classes with Josh's eccentric parents, controversial geneticist Marcus (Robert Bathurst) and author Joyce (Geraldine James). Alsana worries about Magid and resents Samad for sending him away. Samad is angered by Millat's rebellious behaviour and in a drunken rage burns Millat's belongings. Millat leaves home and moves in with the Malfen's. Irie gets a job as Marcus's secretary, and develops a desire to visit Jamaica to discover her roots. After Clara objects, Irie runs away and moves in with Hortense. Samad's colleagues, Shiva (Deepak Verma) and Mo attempt to recruit Millat into an Islamic sect, K.E.V.I.N (Keepers of the Eternal and Victorious Islamic Nation). Millat joins K.E.V.I.N after finding his girlfriend Karin (Annie Cooper)'s immodesty irritating. Joyce worries about Millat's disappearance and whereabouts. After being canvassed by Joely (Sophie Winkleman), a neglected Josh is smitten and leaves home to join F.A.T.E (Fighting Animal Torture and Exploitation), an animal rights group with plans for mouse liberation, whose number one target is Marcus. Meanwhile, to Samad's horror, a video from Bangladesh reveals a grown-up Magid (Christopher Simpson) more "British" than ever and is now an atheist. He has a place at Oxford University and a secret benefactor, who is flying him home.
4	"The Return of Magid Iqbal"	8 October 2002
In 1992, Magid arrives home and moves in with his benefactor, Marcus Malfen. They are preparing for the launch of Malfen's breakthrough in genetic engineering - FutureMouse, an £8 million, genetically modified, terminally-ill mouse. Joyce, concerned about Millat, suggests to Alsana that Millat and Magid should meet. Alsana blames the Malfen's for her sons leaving home, Joyce alleges that the Iqbal's were already dysfunctional provoking Alsana to assault Joyce. When Irie goes to deliver the launch tickets to Millat, she finds him naked and has sexual intercourse with him. When Millat regrets his actions, Irie runs to Magid and has sexual intercourse with him. Later, Irie, disgruntled by Marcus's sexist treatment of her, gives Hortense launch tickets for the Jehovah's Witnesses to attend. F.A.T.E are stopped by police, so Josh and Joely drive away leaving the other members behind. At the FutureMouse launch: Magid reunites with Alsana, and Marcus introduces his mentor, Professor Archibald (the Devil of Dachau (Vernon Dobtcheff), who Archie was supposed to have killed during the war). Josh and Joely capture the mouse. Whilst attempting to shoot Marcus, Millat changes his mind and fires at the mouse cage subsequently shooting Archie. Archie survives due to a coin in his pocket. Irie reveals to Magid and Millat that she is pregnant with twins.

== Production ==
White Teeth was originally due to become a BBC drama series. However, after Channel 4 acquired the rights, it compressed a £3.5 million version of Smith's novel into four one-hour episodes. Company Pictures originally approached Zadie Smith to adapt the screenplay for the series from her novel. However, she declined the offer in order to continue with her next novel The Autograph Man. Smith was later given the role of creative consultant.

In February 2002, the adaptation went into production. It was shot mainly in Willesden and Cricklewood as well as the Caribbean and the Indian sub-continent.

=== Soundtrack ===
White Teeth: The Soundtrack

Soundtrack album by Various Artists
- Released: 16 September 2002
- Genres: Pop, psychedelic pop, glam rock, folk rock, hard rock, new wave, ska, dance, soul, rhythm and blues, alternative rock, punk rock
- Length: 61:06
- Label: Channel 4 Music

==== Track listing ====
No.	Title	Length
1.	"Hang On In There Baby" (Johnny Bristol)	03:51
2.	"Lazy Sunday" (Small Faces)	03:08
3.	"Maggie May" (Rod Stewart)	05:15
4.	"Mama Weer All Crazee Now" (Slade)	03:42
5.	"House Of The Rising Sun" (Frijid Pink)	03:27
6.	"Make Me Smile (Come Up and See Me)" (Steve Harley & Cockney Rebel)	03:59
7.	"Children Of The Revolution" (T. Rex)	02:29
8.	"Solid Air" (John Martyn)	05:43
9.	"You Won't Find Another Fool Like Me" (The New Seekers)	03:11
10.	"Tunnel Of Love" (Fun Boy Three)	03:07
11.	"The Sun and the Rain" (Madness)	03:32
12.	"Back to Life (However Do You Want Me)" (Soul II Soul)	03:46
13.	"God's Cop" (Happy Mondays)	05:00
14.	"Too Blind To See It" (Kym Sims)	03:31
15.	"Suspect Device" (Stiff Little Fingers)	02:35
16.	"Dead Heat" (Barry Adamson)	04:50
Total length:		61:06

== Release ==
In the United Kingdom, White Teeth was broadcast on Channel 4 over four consecutive weeks from 17 September 2002 to 8 October 2002. In the United States, the series aired as part of the PBS Masterpiece Theatre anthology over two consecutive weeks on 11 May 2003 and 18 May 2003. The series was also broadcast in; Australia in November 2002, Sweden in March 2003, Finland in September 2003 as Valkoiset hampaat, and Denmark in December 2004 as Hvide tænder.

The DVD of the series was released on 9 May 2011.

== Reception ==
White Teeth's first episode received 2.2 million viewers and a 14 per cent audience share between 10pm and 11.05pm, according to unofficial overnight figures. The series gained healthy viewing figures throughout and peaked at 3.5 million during the final episode.

In October 2002, the series was hailed as one of the must-watch shows that autumn on British television.

William Feaver called the series "an enjoyable epic sweep type romp... liked the way in which topics are brought in, adroitly dealt with and dealt out." Bonnie Greer thought "the adapter did a very good job... broke it open and made it into something else... lovely multicultural sweep... The cast was wonderful." Mark Lawson "thought the director... was trying to put a visual style to replace the prose style." Tim Lott said "it captured the energy of the book very well... more successful than the book, artistically... very well cast... It's very brilliantly cut. It has great pace... It's one of the best adaptations."

BBC News reported "White Teeth lives up to the book but arguably betters it. The screenplay captures the book's grand scale and intimacy. But it also keeps up the pace where the novel began to flag... it is fresh, energetic and effortlessly played out by a great cast."

TV Quick thought the series was "a fabulous four part drama, with a cracking soundtrack." John Leonard New York called it "superb... rambunctious...White Teeth is a wild ride..." Sean O'Hagen of The Observer described it as "taut and fast-moving... On the television screen, White Teeth unfolds as a thing of often surreal and impressionistic beauty..." Also adding that "it features a strong cast... as well as strong performances from relative newcomers..."

Daily Express thought the series was "beautifully shot, beautifully acted, this modern classic is a screen triumph." The Observer thought "the cinematography has a understated beauty rarely seen in television adaptations."

Book Magazine reported "wonderful... Indian superstar Om Puri is masterful." Express on Sunday reported "White Teeth may finally make Phil Davies the superstar he deserves to be." Independent on Sunday reported "a beguiling performance from newcomer Naomie Harris."

== Awards and nominations ==
Year	Award	Category	Recipient(s)	Result
2003	British Academy Television Awards	Best Make Up & Hair Design	Sharon Martin	Nominated
2003	British Academy Television Awards	Best Photography and Lighting (Fiction/Entertainment)	David Odd	Nominated
2003	British Academy Television Awards	Best Production Design	Alice Normington	Nominated
2003	Cologne Conference	Best Fiction Program	Julian Jarrold	Won
2003	Cologne Conference	TV Spiel Film-Preis		Won
2003	Monte-Carlo Television Festival	Best Mini Series		Won
2003	Monte-Carlo Television Festival	Mini-Series - Best Performance by an Actress	Naomie Harris	Won
2003	Indie Awards	Drama		Nominated
2003	Race in the Media Awards	Drama		Nominated
2003	Royal Television Society Craft & Design Awards	Tape & Film Editing	Andrew Hulme	Nominated
2003	Screen Nation Film & TV Awards	Technical Achievement		Nominated
