= Swing Time =

Swing time is a time feel in jazz music.

Swing Time may also refer to:

- Swing Time (film), a 1936 movie directed by George Stevens starring Fred Astaire and Ginger Rogers
- Swing Time (novel), a 2016 novel by Zadie Smith
- Swing Time Records, a record label active in the 1940s and '50s
