= On Beauty =

2005 novel by Zadie Smith

- First UK edition cover
- Author: Zadie Smith
- Language: English
- Genre: Novel
- Publisher: Hamish Hamilton, London
- Publication date: 2005
- Publication place: United Kingdom
- Media type: Print (hardcover and paperback)
- Pages: 446 pp
- ISBN: 0-241-14293-8
- OCLC: 61855450
- Dewey Decimal: 829.914 22
- LC Class: PR6069.M59 O5 2005b

On Beauty is a 2005 novel by British author Zadie Smith, loosely based on Howards End by E. M. Forster. The story follows the lives of a mixed-race British/American family living in the United States, addresses ethnic and cultural differences in both the USA and the UK, as well as the nature of beauty, and the clash between liberal and conservative academic values. It takes its title from an essay by Elaine Scarry—"On Beauty and Being Just". The Observer described the novel as a "transatlantic comic saga".

The novel was shortlisted for the 2005 Man Booker Prize on 8 September 2005. Smith won the Anisfield-Wolf Book Award for fiction and Orange Prize for Fiction in June 2006.

== Plot summary ==
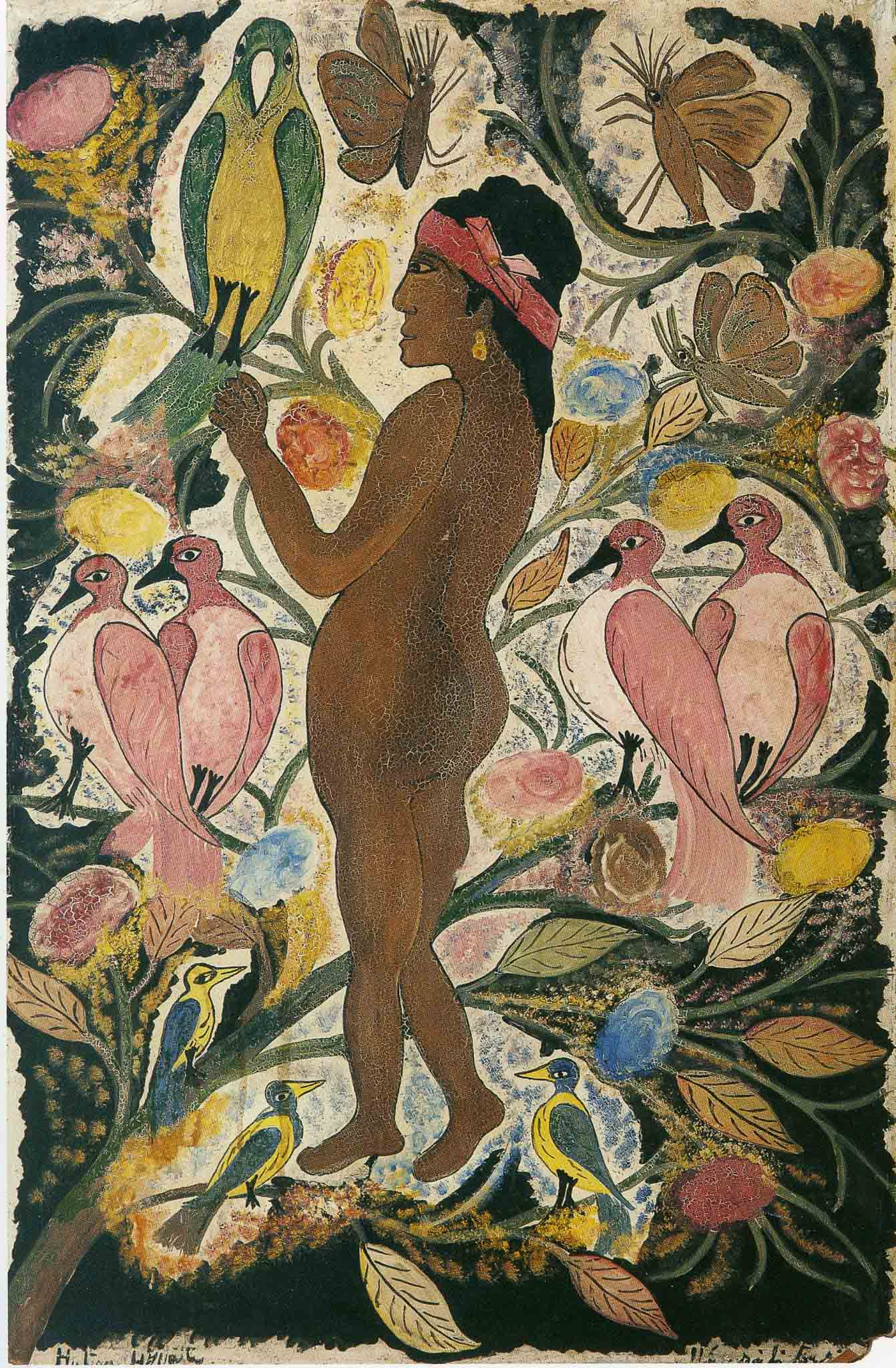
Maitresse Erzulie by Hector Hyppolite

On Beauty centres around two families and their different yet increasingly intertwined lives. The Belsey family consists of university professor Howard, a white Englishman and Rembrandt scholar; his African-American wife Kiki; and their children, Jerome, Zora, and Levi. They live in the fictional university town of Wellington, outside Boston. Howard's professional nemesis is Monty Kipps, a Trinidadian living in Britain with his wife Carlene and children Victoria and Michael.

The Belsey family defines itself as liberal and atheist, and Howard in particular is furious when his son Jerome, lately a born-again Christian, goes to work as a summer intern with the ultra-conservative Christian Kipps family. After a brief and badly ending relationship with Victoria, Jerome returns home. However, the families are again brought closer nine months later when the Kipps family move to Wellington, and Monty begins work at the university. Meanwhile, the Belsey family is dealing with the fallout of Howard's affair with colleague and family friend Claire.

Carlene and Kiki become friends despite the tensions between their families. The women bond over Maitresse Erzulie, a painting by Haitian Hector Hyppolite in Carlene's library. Carlene tells Kiki that she purchased the painting in Haiti prior to meeting Monty. The women see each other twice more before Carlene dies of cancer, having kept her illness from her family. The Belseys attend Carlene's funeral in London, where Howard has sex with Victoria, now his student and with whom he had an ongoing flirtation. While reviewing Carlene's will, the Kipps family discover that Carlene intended Maitresse Erzulie be left to Kiki. Believing Carlene to have been of unsound mind, Monty instead hangs the painting in his university office.

The rivalry between Monty and Howard increases as Monty challenges the liberal attitudes of the university on issues such as affirmative action, which comes to a head when both men debate the topic before students and staff. Monty's academic success also highlights Howard's inadequacies and failure to publish a long-awaited book. Zora and Levi become friends with Carl, a young African-American man of a lower-class background. Zora uses him as a poster-child for her campaign to allow talented non-students to attend university classes. For Levi, Carl is a source of identity, as a member of what Levi considers a more "authentic" black culture.

Levi quits his retail job due to its poor employee treatment. Struggling with his mixed-race identity, he befriends and works for a group of Haitian men who sell counterfeit merchandise on Boston streetcorners. Levi views them as the "essence of blackness," while remaining self-conscious of being seen in public with members of the Haitian population of Wellington. Levi's friend Chouchou claims that Monty bought Haitian artwork from peasants for very little money, and Levi and Chouchou steal the Hyppolite painting from Monty's office as part of a campaign against anti-Haitian injustice. Upon discovering the stolen painting in Levi's room, Jerome finds a note from Carlene gifting the painting to Kiki.

Meanwhile, Zora and Howard arrive home, and Zora reveals to Howard that she knows about two crucial affairs: his with Victoria, and Monty’s with another student. Zora tells her mother about the affair with Victoria.

The final chapter depicts the Belseys in an early stage of separation. In the final scene, Howard fails to deliver a potentially career-reviving lecture. Instead, he smiles at his wife in the audience and she returns the smile, under a projection of Rembrandt's depiction of his own wife in A Woman Bathing in a Stream (1654).

== Reception ==
=== Lists ===
In 2024, the novel was listed by The New York Times as number 94 in its list of 100 Best Books of the 21st century.

== Inspiration ==
The book is loosely based on Howards End by E. M. Forster; Smith has called it an "homage". Among the parallels are the opening sections (Howards End begins with letters from Helen to her sister, On Beauty with emails from Jerome to his father); the bequeathing of a valuable item to a member of the other family (the Wilcox house Howards End is left by Ruth Wilcox to Margaret Schlegel; Carlene leaves Kiki a painting); and, more broadly, the idea of two families with very different ideas and values gradually becoming linked.

Much like Howards End, the novel is full of humanist themes, including most obviously and directly in its depiction of clashes between morally concerned liberal atheism and traditional religious morality, but also in its deep focus on the relationship of its characters and their interiority. This concern is evident from the start; the narrative is foregrounded with a quote from Humanists UK executive director Harold Blackham.

The setting of much of the novel, the fictitious Wellington College and surrounding community, contains many close parallels to the real Harvard University and Cambridge, Massachusetts. Smith wrote part of the novel as a fellow at Harvard Radcliffe Institute.

Smith gives herself a very brief Hitchcock-style cameo in the novel: the narrator (or, indirectly, Howard) describes her as a "feckless novelist", a visiting fellow of the fictional Wellington faculty (as Smith was of Harvard's) who is quick to abandon a tedious meeting.

The failed final lecture that concludes the novel is loosely based on an infamous job talk given by former Harvard professor Leland de la Durantaye for the Harvard English Department on Lolita.

== See also ==
- Hysterical realism
- Historiographic metafiction
- The Fraud by Zadie Smith
