= NW (novel) =

2012 novel by Zadie Smith

- First UK edition cover
- Author: Zadie Smith
- Language: English
- Genre: Novel, experimental novel, tragicomedy
- Publisher: Hamish Hamilton, London
- Publication date: 27 August 2012
- Publication place: United Kingdom
- Media type: Print (hardcover)
- Pages: 304 pp
- ISBN: 0-241-14414-0
- Dewey Decimal: 823.914

NW is a 2012 novel by British author Zadie Smith. It takes its title from the NW postcode area in North-West London, where the novel is set. The novel is experimental and follows four different characters living in London, shifting between first and third person, stream-of-consciousness, screenplay-style dialogue, and other narrative techniques in an attempt to reflect the polyphonic nature of contemporary urban life. It was nominated for the 2013 Women's Prize for Fiction.

== Content ==
=== Plot ===
Set in the northwest of London, England, four locals — Leah Hanwell, Natalie (born Keisha) Blake, Felix Cooper, and Nathan Bogle — try to make adult lives outside of Caldwell, the working-class council estate where they grew up. While Leah has not managed to venture far from her childhood location, her best friend Natalie, now a successful, self-made barrister, lives in an affluent neighbourhood in a Victorian house. Despite their friendship and history, the two women find that they are very different from each other socio-economically. Meanwhile, a chance encounter brings Felix and Nathan together. Leah is the focus of a lower-working-class life in comparison to Natalie who represents the small higher-working-class. All four characters represent a piece of the lost generation struggling to ascend economically.

Part 1 – "visitation": Social worker Leah Hanwell is contacted by Shar, a now destitute former school classmate, who claims she needs money for a cab ride to visit her mother in the emergency room. Leah later learns that Shar is a drug addict and this is a scam she regularly operates for drug money. Leah becomes obsessed with Shar and begins following her around Northwest London. After tracking Shar to her flat one day and leaving behind pamphlets for a rehabilitation center, Leah receives a threatening phone call from a man whom she believes to be Shar's boyfriend. Believing she recognizes his voice on the street one day, Leah inadvertently goads her husband, Michel, into confronting the man, who kicks their dog to death. Around the same time, Leah has a chance encounter with her former teenage crush, Nathan "Nate" Bogle, now a homeless drug addict; it occurs to Leah that Nathan may be Shar's boyfriend and the man who called her. Shortly thereafter, Leah learns of a local man's brutal murder during Notting Hill Carnival. The incidents lead her to question her trust in the community and her own life's work.

Part 2 – "guest": Former drug addict Felix Cooper wants to start a new life with his girlfriend, Grace. Formerly a successful chef, he bowed to pressure from his Rastafarian father and uncle to quit his job to go into a tourism business with them; the failure of the business precipitated Felix's decline into drug abuse and eventually rehab. He meets one last time with his drug-using ex-lover to say goodbye and purchases a heavily damaged vintage car with the intention of restoring it. On his way home, a pregnant white woman mistakes him for the companion of a pair of train passengers because all three are black. Felix inadvertently slights the men in his efforts to persuade one of them to move his feet, to allow the woman to sit down. After Felix departs the train, the men follow him and rob him. When Felix refuses to hand over a pair of zirconium earrings that were a gift from Grace, one of the men impulsively stabs him to death.

Part 3 - "host": Keisha "Natalie" Blake has met every goal she ever set for herself. She graduated from a prestigious university, became a successful lawyer, married an investment banker from a rich family, and moved to one of to the most expensive parts of London to raise her two children with him. Nonetheless, Natalie feels that her life is empty and is haunted by thoughts that she isn't a complete person. She struggles to reconcile her working-class, liberal, Afro-Caribbean roots- "Keisha"- with the upwardly mobile, socially conservative "Natalie" persona she has crafted for herself and which she has come to feel increasingly trapped by. Hoping to find an escape, she arranges a series of disastrous sexual encounters online with couples via swingers sites. On the night of the Notting Hill Carnival, Natalie's husband learns of her double life and they have a disastrous argument that culminates in Natalie suffering a nervous breakdown and wandering into the carnival in her pyama.

Part 4 – "crossing": Wandering the streets of London during the Notting Hill Carnival in a fugue state, Natalie runs into Nathan Bogle, who offers her comfort. The two smoke marijuana together and reminisce about their divergent paths in life; Natalie looks for a reason for Nathan's downward trajectory in spite of his good grades in school and personal charisma, but Nathan sees nothing more than bad luck as responsible for his current position in life. The two pass the site of Felix's murder, which startles Natalie. Nathan makes reference to a violent acquaintance of his named Tyler; it becomes apparent that Nathan and Tyler were the men who robbed Felix, though Tyler actually committed the murder. She later accompanies Nathan to a tube station where she sees him receive stolen goods from Shar and another woman, whom Nathan implies work for him as prostitutes. Natalie wanders to a bridge where she attempts suicide, only for Nathan to stop her.

Part 5 – "visitation": Already strained by the events she's experienced and witnessed, Leah suffers a psychotic break after Michel learns she's secretly been taking birth control pills to prevent a pregnancy despite their trying to conceive. Michel calls Natalie, who remains shaken after her near suicide. Natalie arrives and recites what she realizes are a series of empty conservative talking points and declares her belief in the just world fallacy, and that the two women are successful because they are deserving while people like Nat Bogle and Felix Cooper suffer terrible fates because they are unworthy. Feeling the need to do something truly meaningful, the women each contact the police to let them know Nathan Bogle has information about Felix's murder before resettling into their lives as they existed at the start of the book.

=== Characters ===
Leah Hanwell: Her parents are from Ireland and were able to provide a stable home for Leah. Unlike her best friend Natalie, Leah has never been very ambitious and still lives in her old neighbourhood. She is content with her job, working for an organisation distributing lottery earnings to social projects and still very attracted to her husband Michel, a Frenchman with Algerian roots. But while Leah does not want her life to change, Michel wants children. Leah has been avoiding the confrontation and lies about no longer taking her birth control. Although Leah is generally at peace with the choices she has made so far and therefore should have little reason to envy Natalie, she's increasingly ill-at-ease with her successful friend's new-found wealth and status.

Felix Cooper: After struggling with drug addiction for years, Felix is about to turn his life around. He cuts ties with people from his drug-dominated past and makes plans for a career in film. His new lease on life is inspired by his new girlfriend Grace, whose optimism and can-do-spirit is contagious.

Natalie Blake: Natalie's parents are from Jamaica. They originally gave her the name Keisha, which Natalie dropped during her time at university, to better fit in with her new social circle. After graduating from a prestigious university, becoming a successful lawyer and marrying into money, Natalie is the only member of her family who is upwardly mobile. This enables her to financially support her previously convicted younger brother and her older sister's large family. Nevertheless, Natalie is regularly accused of being a "coconut" – black outside, white inside; someone who denies her origins to pander to the ruling class. Natalie feels increasingly alienated from her original community and cannot even open up to her childhood friend Leah.

Nathan Bogle: As a young boy, he showed great potential as a football player. His ambitions were foiled by his drug addiction. Now he earns his living through illegal activities, operating from a house in Leah's street.

== Themes ==
One of the novel's main themes is the restructuring of the class system. Whereas one's ethnicity used to be seen as an identity defining feature, it now no longer automatically entails membership in any specific milieu, as illustrated by Natalie's example. In the highly competitive society of Natalie's London, belonging to an ethnic minority no longer guarantees any form of mutual solidarity. Tensions between the different classes of London remain prevalent in the face of increasing disparities in income (and other forms of wealth inequality) even as ambitious immigrants join the upper class via their own wealth accumulation.

In a world with an increasing variety of lifestyle choices, the issue of self examination gains importance. Leah, who sees no appeal in the traditional maternal role, rejecting still widespread societal expectations, cuts to the core of this new liberty: "I am the sole author of the dictionary that defines me." This freedom of self-definition however also comes with increased responsibility. Getting to choose means having to carefully consider your choices and having more occasion for doubts. In NW, the possibility of being the sole author of your own life is portrayed as a blessing and a curse at the same time.

Self-examination, however, does not always protect against delusion. In a quest to be all things to all people, a person can lose sight of their innermost self. In contrast to Leah, Natalie has always tried her best to meet societal expectations – in her role as daughter, sister, mother, wife, lawyer, rich person, poor person, Briton and Jamaican. Each of these roles demands its own costume. Natalie comes to see them as a cage, from which she tries to escape, through her sexual escapades.

The novel portrays different reactions to the social pressures placed on women with regard to motherhood. Leah ultimately resists the pressure, but still feels a need to hide her desire to remain childless as long as possible. Natalie wants to meet social expectations of motherhood, but in a way that does not hamper her career – to her, having it all is mostly a question of timing, allowing her to meet personal as well as professional objectives. The novel also highlights different attitudes towards maternal perfectionism depending on someone's milieu. In Caldwell it is enough to abstain from physical violence to be considered a decent mother. Everywhere else, everything has to be perfect and even then the mother is not guaranteed to escape judgement.

== Style ==
Smith's style in NW is characterized by a rapid succession of associations, conveyed in brief sentences, dialogues and short scenes in a mix of literary and colloquial language. Instead of an omniscient narrator, she uses various narrative techniques to portray the multiple layers and idiosyncrasies of her four central characters' perspectives. Natalie is efficient, goal-oriented, well-organized: her life is systematically laid out in 185 numbered vignettes. Leah in contrast is mellow and prefers to go with the flow: her part of the book is dominated by stream-of-consciousness. Smith's use of this narrative technique invites comparisons to James Joyce, Virginia Woolf and John Dos Passos.

The central characters' life stories are told independently, but juxtaposed in a manner that enhances mutual characterization. The use of various narrative techniques as well as the frequent change of perspective create a tension between internal and external views on the characters. While Smith places an emphasis on the interior, with characters like Leah, Natalie and Felix, she deliberately refrains from guiding readers' sympathies towards Nathan, neglecting to portray his inner life. She aims for Nathan to remain a stranger to readers, in order to confront them with their reaction to such a character – the sort of isolated, homeless addict, who is likely to be perceived as a threat first and foremost. The objective is to preserve his otherness.

== Reception ==
The book was praised by critic James Wood, who criticised Smith's early work for its tendency towards what he called hysterical realism. Wood included the novel in his "Best Books of 2012" and commented that "underneath the formal experimentation runs a steady, clear, realistic genius. Smith is a great urban realist... the best novel she has yet written." Writing in The Daily Telegraph, Philip Hensher gave the novel five stars, describing it as "a joyous, optimistic, angry masterpiece, and no better English novel will be published this year, or, probably, next." Award-winning novelist Anne Enright reviewed the book for The New York Times, arguing that "the result is that rare thing, a book that is radical and passionate and real".

== Television adaptation ==
The novel was adapted into a 2016 television film by the BBC directed by Saul Dibb and written by Rachel Bennette, starring Nikki Amuka-Bird and Phoebe Fox. It was broadcast on BBC Two on 14 November 2016.
