= Intimations =

2020 essay collection by Zadie Smith

- First edition
- Author: Zadie Smith
- Language: English
- Publisher: Penguin Books
- Media type: Print (Hardback)

Intimations is a 2020 collection of essays by writer Zadie Smith. Smith began writing the book around the time the COVID-19 pandemic began in the United States, and completed it soon after the murder of George Floyd.

The essays discuss topics including creative writing, the pandemic, and the murder of George Floyd.

== Reception ==
Constance Grady, writing for Vox, referred to Smith's essays about current events as occasionally "facile" and that the collection was best when addressing the nature and utility of writing.
