= The Wife of Bath's Tale =

Part of the Canterbury Tales

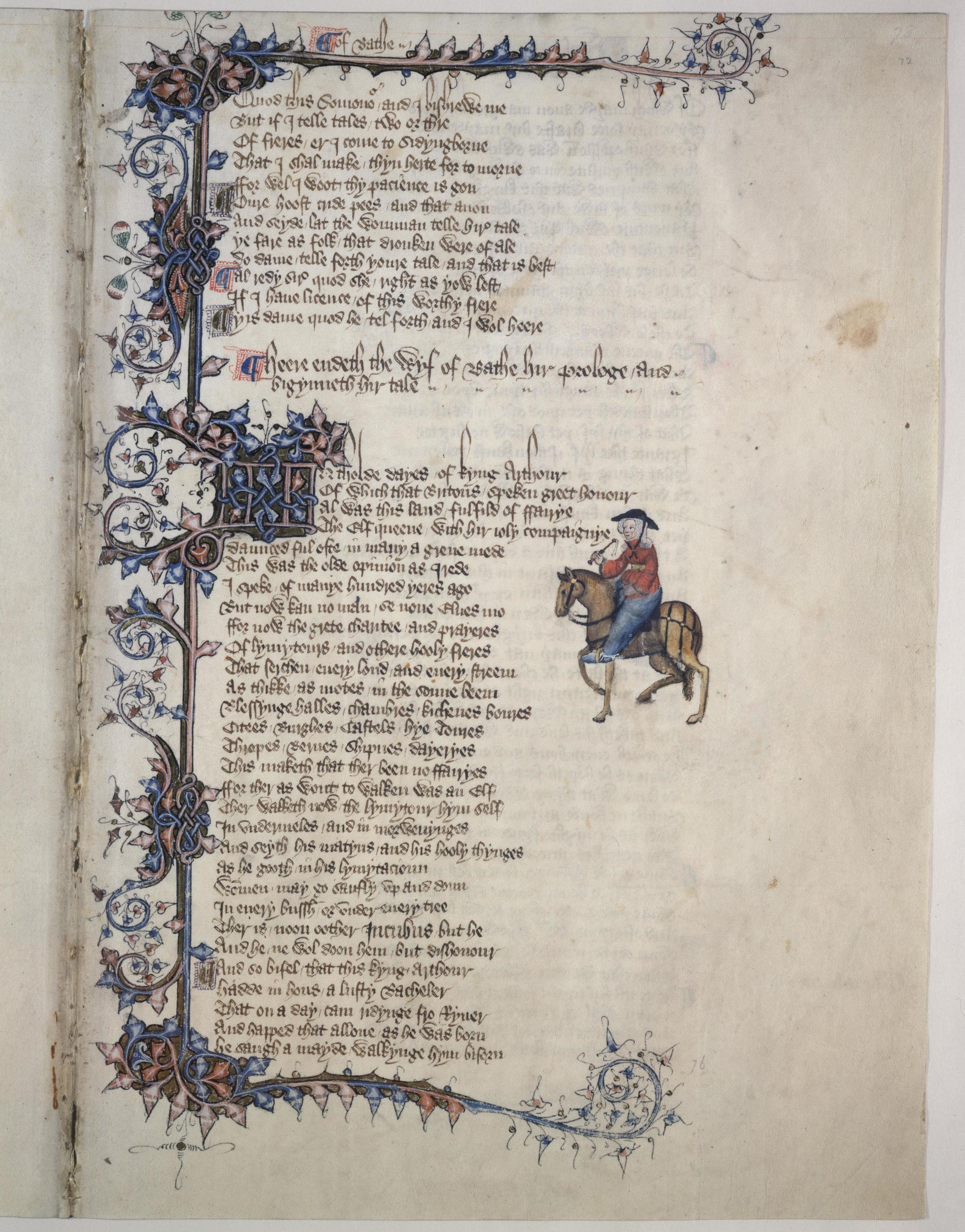
The Wife of Bath's Tale in the Ellesmere manuscript of The Canterbury Tales, c. 1405–1410.

"The Wife of Bath's Tale" (Middle English: The Tale of the Wyf of Bathe) is among the best-known of Geoffrey Chaucer's Canterbury Tales. It provides insight into the role of women in the Late Middle Ages. The wife of Bath is one of Chaucer's most developed characters, with her Prologue twice as long as her Tale. She calls herself both Alyson and Alys in the prologue, but these are also the names of her "gossip", a close friend whom she mentions several times, as well as many female characters throughout The Canterbury Tales.

Chaucer wrote the "Prologue of the Wife of Bath's Tale" during the fourteenth century, during the reign of Richard II. The tale is often regarded as the first of the "marriage group" of tales, which includes the Clerk's, the Merchant's, and Franklin's tales.

The tale contains an example of the "loathly lady" motif.

== Synopsis ==
=== Prologue ===
The Wife of Bath's Prologue is, by far, the longest in The Canterbury Tales and is twice as long as the actual story, showing the importance of the prologue to the significance of the overall tale. In the beginning, the wife expresses her views in which she believes the morals of women are not merely that they all solely desire "sovereignty,” but that each individual woman should have the opportunity to make the decision. The Wife of Bath speaks against many of the typical customs of the time, and provides her assessment of the roles of women in society.

The Wife of Bath particularly speaks out in defence of those who, like her, have married multiple times. As a counterargument, she mentions many holy men who have had multiple wives:

I woot wel Abraham was an holy man, And Iacob eek, as ferforth as I can; And ech of hem hadde wyves mo than two; And many another holy man also. Whan saugh ye ever, in any maner age, That hye God defended mariage By expres word? I pray you, telleth me; Or wher comanded he virginitee?	I know well that Abraham was a holy man, and Jacob as well, as far as I know, and each of them had more than two wives, and many other holy men did as well. When have you seen that in any time great God forbade marriage explicitly? Tell me, I pray you, Or where did He order people to remain virgins?

In this extract, she addresses why society should not look down on her or any other woman who has wed to multiple men, throughout their life. The tale confronts the double standard and the social belief in the inherent inferiority of women and tries to establish a defense of secular women's sovereignty that opposes the conventions available to her.

=== Tale ===
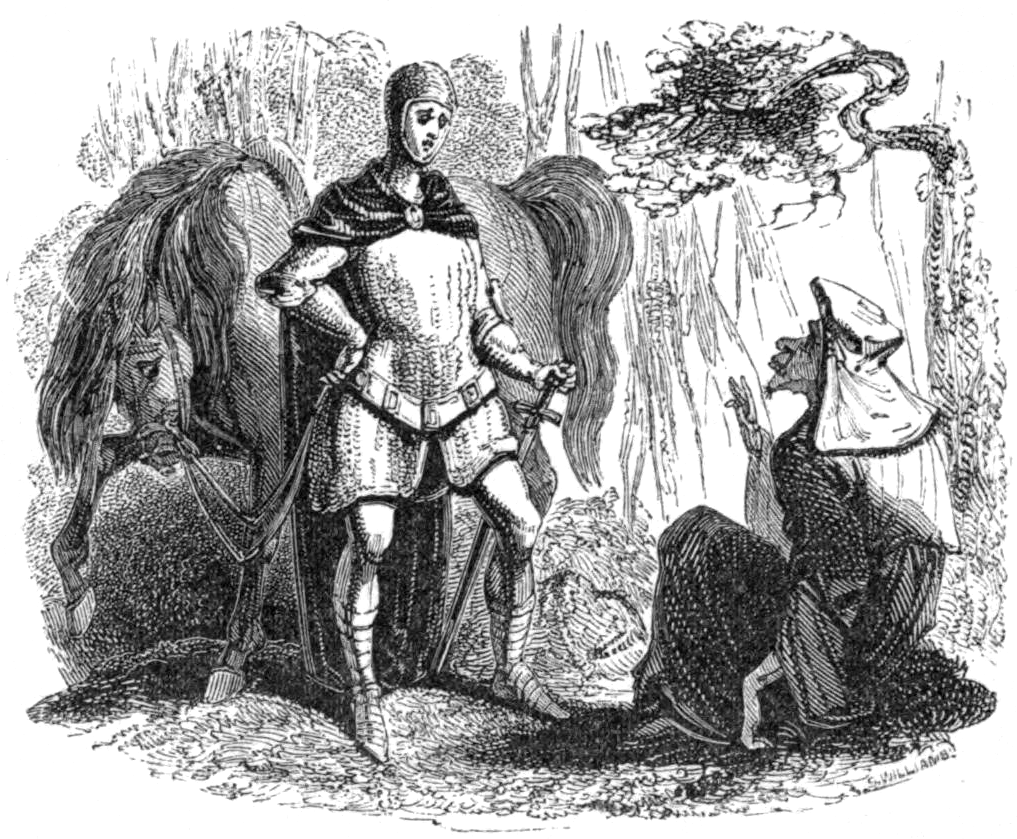
Illustration by Samuel Williams (c. 1870)

In the days of King Arthur, the land was full of mischievous elves and fairies. (These days it is not so: women nowadays have to fear only the attentions of roving friars.) In that olden time, one of Arthur's knights while traveling alone encounters a woman and rapes her by force. The knight is arrested and condemned to death, but Queen Guinevere and her ladies intercede on his behalf, and he is turned over to Guinevere for punishment instead. The Queen tells the knight that he may save his own life if he can discover, in a year and a day, what it is that women most desire.

Everywhere the knight goes, he asks the opinion of those he meets; but he never gets the same answer twice. Some say women desire riches; or sexual pleasure; or a variety of husbands; or to be flattered; or to be free; or to be confided in. (The wife of Midas was confided in, but in the end she could not keep his secret. This story's conclusion, says the Wife, may be found in Ovid.)

The year having passed fruitlessly, the knight turns homeward in sorrow. At the edge of the woods he sees twenty-four maidens dancing and singing, but when he approaches they disappear as if by magic, leaving only the ugliest old woman anyone could imagine. She asks his trouble, and the knight explains that he seeks to know what women most desire. She whispers to him the answer, but only after extracting from him the promise to grant her the first favor she should ask him in the future. Arriving at the court, he gives the old hag's answer:

Wommen desiren to have sovereynetee
As wel over hir housbond as hir love,
And for to been in maistrie hym above.
This is youre mooste desir [...] (1038–1041)

That is, women most desire sovereignty over their husbands and lovers. This is unanimously agreed to be true by the women of the court, who, accordingly, free the knight.

The hag then calls on the knight, before all the court, to grant her favor: his hand in marriage. Aghast, he begs her to choose another favor; but she is firm, and he keeps his word. There is no wedding feast. That night, the knight tosses and turns and will not embrace the hag. She asks the reason. He gives three: that she is loathsome, and old, and low-born. She tells him that all this could be amended, if only he were pleasant toward her. Concerning her low birth, she quotes "the wise poete of Florence," Dante, who writes that virtue and nobility do not rise along the branches of the family tree but rather descend by God's grace upon the leaves (Conv. IV.20; Purg. VII). She urges him to read Seneca, Boethius, and Valerius, in all of whom he will find "that he is gentil that dooth gentil dedis," regardless of birth. Concerning her poverty, she reminds him that Jesus Christ chose to be poor; and that

Poverte a spectacle is, as thynketh me,
Thurgh which he may his verray freendes see. (1203–1204)

Concerning her old age, she reminds him that one should be courteous to one's elders. Concerning her ugliness, she assures him that for that reason he needn't fear becoming a cuckold; yet she will always satisfy his appetites.

Finally, she asks him which he would prefer: an old and ugly wife who is true and humble, or a beautiful young wife with all the risks to his reputation that such a wife might entail. The knight replies that he will express no opinion; she should choose the better option according to her own pleasure and honor. "Then I have got mastery of you?" she inquires; he agrees. She then promises him both beauty and fidelity; casting up the curtain, he finds that she has become beautiful. He kisses her a thousand times; she promises to obey him in everything; and they live their lives in perfect joy.

The Wife of Bath ends her tale with a prayer that all women be blessed with meek, young, vigorous husbands and the grace to outlive them; and that all ungovernable husbands and skinflints be cursed with short lives and pestilence.

== Themes ==
=== Feminist critique ===
The Wife of Bath's Prologue simultaneously enumerates and critiques the long tradition of misogyny in ancient and medieval literature. As Helen Cooper notes, the Wife of Bath's "materials are part of the vast medieval stock of antifeminism", giving St. Jerome's Adversus Jovinianum, which was "written to refute the proposition put forward by one Jovinianus that virginity and marriage were of equal worth,” as one of many examples.

Jane Chance (1995) suggests that the Wife of Bath's Prologue, depicting a self-assured and realistic (rather than allegorical) woman, might have been written as a self-imposed "poetic penance" for Chaucer's "shameful" depiction of Criseyde in Troilus and Criseyde, which he himself acknowledged in the Prologue to The Legend of Good Women.

Ruth Evans, in Feminist Readings in Middle English Literature (1995), postulates that the Wife of Bath embodies the ideology of "sexual economics" and suffers the "psychological effects of economic necessity, specifically on sexual mores." The Wife of Bath is described as a woman in the trade of textiles, she is neither upper-class or lower, strictly a middle-class woman living independently off her own profit. The Wife of Bath sees the economics of marriage as a profitable business endeavor, based solely on supply and demand: she sells her body in marriage, and in return she is given money in the form of titles and inheritance. She is both the broker and the commodity in this arrangement.

The Wife of Bath's first marriage occurred at the age of twelve, which highlights the lack of control that girls and women had over their own bodies in medieval Europe, as children were often bartered, in marriage, to increase family status. By choosing her next husbands and subsequently "selling herself," she regains some semblance of control and ownership over her body, and the profit is solely hers to keep.

The simple fact that she is a widow who has remarried more than once radically defies medieval conventions. Further evidence of this can be found through her observation: "For hadde God commanded maydenhede, / Thanne hadde he dampned weddyng with the dede." She refutes Jerome's proposition, concerning virginity and marriage, by noting that God would have condemned marriage and procreation if He had commanded virginity. Her decision to include God as a defence for her lustful appetites is significant, as it shows how well-read she is. By the same token, her interpretations of Scripture, such as Paul on marriage, are tailored to suit her own purposes.

While Chaucer's Wife of Bath is clearly familiar with the many ancient and medieval views on proper female behavior, she also boldly questions their validity. Her repeated acts of remarriage, for instance, are an example of how she mocks "clerical teaching concerning the remarriage of widows." Furthermore, she adds, "a rich widow was considered to be a match equal to, or more desirable than, a match with a virgin of property," illustrating this point by elaborating at length concerning her ability to remarry four times and to attract a much younger man.

While she gleefully confesses to the many ways in which she falls short of conventional ideals for women, she also points out that it is men who constructed those ideals in the first place.

Who painted the lion, tell me who?
By God, if women had written stories,
As clerks have within their studies,
They would have written of men more wickedness
Than all the male sex could set right.

=== Behaviour in marriage ===
Both Mary Carruthers and Cooper reflect on the way that Chaucer's Wife of Bath does not behave as society dictates, in any of her marriages. Through her nonconformity to the expectations of her role as a wife, the audience is shown what proper behaviour, in marriage, should be like. Carruthers' essay outlines the existence of deportment books, the purpose of which was to teach women how to be model wives. Carruthers notes how the Wife's behaviour in the first of her marriages "is almost everything the deportment-book writers say it should not be." For example, she lies to her old husbands about them getting drunk and saying some regrettable things. Yet Carruthers does note that the Wife does do a decent job of upholding her husbands' public honour. Moreover, deportment books taught women that "the husband deserves control of the wife, because he controls the estate"; it is clear that the Wife is the one who controls certain aspects of her husband's behaviour in her various marriages.

Cooper also notes that behaviour in marriage is a theme that emerges in the Wife of Bath's Prologue; neither the Wife nor her husbands conform to any conventional ideals of marriage. Cooper observes that the Wife's fifth husband, in particular, "cannot be taken as any principle of correct Christian marriage". In a remarkable passage, the Wife describes her relationship with husband no. 5 (Jankyn) as follows:

Now of my fifthe housbonde wol I telle. God lete his soule nevere come in helle! And yet was he to me the mooste shrewe; That feele I on my ribbes al by rewe, And evere shal unto myn endyng day. But in oure bed he was so fressh and gay, And therwithal so wel koude he me glose, Whan that he wolde han my bele chose; That thogh he hadde me bete on every bon, He koude wynne agayn my love anon.	Now of my fifth husband I will tell. God let his soul never come in hell! And yet he was to me the greatest scoundrel; That feel I on my ribs one after another, And ever shall unto my final day. But in our bed he was so lively and gay, And moreover he so well could deceive me, When he would have my `pretty thing'; That though he had beat me on every bone, He could win back my love straightway. (503-524)

Based on this passage, Jankyn fails to exhibit behaviour conventionally expected within a marriage. This can, perhaps, be attributed to his young age and lack of experience in relationships, as he does change at the end, as does the Wife of Bath. Thus, through both the Wife's and her fifth and favorite husband's failure to conform to expected behaviour in marriage, the poem exposes the complexity of the institution of marriage and of relationships, more broadly.

But the passage has been interpreted differently. Elaine Hansen writes that this passage suggests that

male violence is not just offset by good sex but male violence and female pain are mutually constitutive elements of female desire. [. . .] The message seems to be clear here: whatever sexual pleasure the Wife may enjoy, sober or not, has a considerable element of what we might identify as masochism. The Wife is apparently a woman who enjoys being beaten up by her young husband.

Other authors go farther, suggesting that Chaucer intends for us to view the Wife as a pathological, even sociopathic, character.

Harriet Muus argues instead that the mate preferences attributed by Chaucer to the Wife are quite normal: "Chaucer in this passage presents a beautifully concise and accurate précis of a typical (heterosexual) woman’s psychology of (intersexual) attraction." Muus points to studies that document women's preference for men with aggressive or dominating personalities, and suggests that the Wife, far from being a masochist, is saying "The delights of partnering with a ‘bad boy’ like Jankyn are sufficient to compensate for the bad times, even the times when he is physically abusive to me." Muus argues in addition that these preferences, assuming they have remained constant over time, could have been recognized by any careful observer, including Chaucer. Thus, she argues, "Chaucer’s insights into female psychology were at least as astute as those of his modern critics."

=== Female sovereignty ===
As Cooper argues, the tension between experience and textual authority is central to the Prologue. The Wife argues for the relevance of her own marital experience. For instance, she notes that:

Unnethe myghte they the statut holde "unnethe" = not easily
In which that they were bounden unto me. "woot" = know
Ye woot wel what I meene of this, pardee! "pardee" = "by God", cf. French "par dieu"
As help me God, I laughe whan I thynke
How pitously a-nyght I made hem swynke! (III.204–08) "hem" = them; "swynke" = work

The Wife of Bath's first three husbands are depicted as subservient men who cater to her sexual appetites. Her characterisation as domineering is particularly evident in the following passage:

Of tribulacion in mariage,
Of which I am expert in al myn age
This is to seyn, myself have been the whippe. (III.179–81)

The image of the whip underlines her dominant role as the partnership; she tells everyone that she is the one in charge in her household, especially in the bedroom, where she appears to have an insatiable thirst for sex; the result is a satirical, lascivious depiction of a woman, but also of feudal power arrangements.

However, the end of both the Prologue and the Tale make evident that it is not dominance that she wishes to gain, in her relation with her husband, but a kind of equality.

In the Prologue, she says: "God help me so, I was to him as kinde/ As any wyf from Denmark unto Inde,/ And also trewe, and so was he to me." In her Tale, the old woman tells her husband: "I prey to God that I mot sterven wood,/ But I to yow be also good and trewe/ As evere was wyf, sin that the world was newe."

In both cases, the Wife says so to the husband, after she has been given "sovereyntee.” She is handed over the control of all the property, along with the control of her husband's tongue. The old woman in the Wife of Bath's Tale is also given the freedom to choose which role he wishes her to play in the marriage.

=== Economics of love ===
In her essay "The Wife of Bath and the Painting of Lions," Carruthers describes the relationship that existed between love and economics for both medieval men and women. Carruthers notes that it is the independence that the Wife's wealth provides for her that allows her to love freely. This implies that autonomy is an important component in genuine love, and since autonomy can only be achieved through wealth, wealth, then, becomes the greatest component for true love. Love can, in essence, be bought: Chaucer makes reference to this notion, when he has the Wife tell one of her husbands:

Is it for ye wolde have my queynte allone? "queynte" = a nice thing, cf. Latin quoniam, with obvious connotation of "cunt"
Wy, taak it al! Lo, have it every deel! "deel" = "part"; plus, the implication of transaction
Peter! I shrewe yow, but ye love it weel; "Peter" = St. Peter; "shrewe" = curse; hence: "I curse you if you don't love it well."
For if I wolde selle my bele chose, "belle chose": another suggestion of female genitalia (her "lovely thing")
I koude walke as fressh as is a rose;
But I wol kepe it for youre owene tooth. (III.444–49) "tooth" = taste, pleasure

The Wife appears to make reference to prostitution, whereby "love" in the form of sex is a "deal," bought and sold. The character's use of words, such as "dette (debt)" and "paiement (payment)" also portray love in economic terms, as did the medieval Church: sex was the debt women owed to the men that they married. Hence, while the point that Carruthers makes is that money is necessary for women to achieve sovereignty in marriage, a look at the text reveals that love is, among other things, an economic concept. This is perhaps best demonstrated by the fact that her fifth husband gives up wealth, in return for love, honour, and respect.

The Wife of Bath does take men seriously and wants them for more than just sexual pleasure and money. When the Wife of Bath states, "but well I know, surely, God expressly instructed us to increase and multiply. I can well understand that noble text" to bear fruit, not in children, but financially through marriage, land, and from inheritance when her husbands die; Chaucer's Wife chose to interpret the meaning of the statement by clarifying that she has no interest in childbearing, as a means of showing fruitfulness, but the progression of her financial stability is her ideal way of proving success.

=== Sex and Lollardy ===
While sexuality is a dominant theme in The Wife of Bath's Prologue, it is less obvious that her sexual behaviour can be associated with Lollardy. Critics such as Helen Cooper and Carolyn Dinshaw point to the link between sex and Lollardy. Both describe the Wife's knowledge and use of Scripture, in her justification of her sexual behaviour. When she states that "God bad us for to wexe and multiplye", she appears to suggest that there is nothing wrong with sexual lust, because God wants humans to procreate. The Wife's "emphatic determination to recuperate sexual activity, within a Christian context, and on the authority of the Bible [on a number of occasions throughout the text] echoes one of the points made in the Lollard Twelve Conclusions of 1395". The very fact that she remarries, after the death of her first husband, could be viewed as Chaucer's characterisation of the Wife as a supporter of Lollardy, if not necessarily a Lollard, herself, since Lollards advocated the remarriage of widows.

Author Alastair Minnis makes the assertion that the Wife of Bath is not a Lollard, at all, but was educated by her late husband, Jankyn, an Oxford-educated clerk, who translated and read aloud anti-feminist texts. Jankyn gave her knowledge far beyond what was available to women of her status, which explains how she can hold her own, when justifying her sexual behavior to the Canterbury group. Further, Minnis explains that "being caught in possession of a woman's body, so to speak, was an offense, in itself, carrying the penalty of a life-sentence", showing a perception that in medieval Europe, women could not hold priestly duties on the basis of their sex and no matter how flawless her moral status was, her body would always bar her from the ability to preach the word of God. Minnis goes on to say that "it might well be concluded that it was better to be a secret sinner than a woman," as a sinful man could always change his behavior and repent, but a woman could not change her sex.

=== Femininity ===
In an effort to assert women's equality with men, the Wife of Bath states that an equal balance of power is needed, in a functional society. Wilks proposes that through the sovereignty theme, a reflection of women's integral role in governance compelled Chaucer's audience to associate the Wife's tale with the reign of Anne of Bohemia. By questioning universal assumptions of male dominance, making demands in her own right, conducting negotiations within her marriages, and disregarding conventional feminine ideals, Chaucer's Wife of Bath was ahead of her time.

=== The Queen's Law ===
The Wife of Bath's Tale reverses the medieval roles of men and women (especially regarding legal power), and it also suggests a theme of feminist coalition-building. Appointed as sovereign and judge over the convicted knight, the Queen holds a type of power given to men in the world outside the tale. She has power, as judge over the knight's life. Author Emma Lipton writes that the Queen uses this power to move from a liberal court to an educational court. In this sense, the court is moving beyond punishment for the offense, and it, now, puts a meaning behind the offense, tying it to consequences. In the tale, the Queen is a figurehead for a feminist movement, within a society that looks much like the misogynistic world in which the Canterbury Tales are told. From this tale's feminist notion that the Queen leads, women are empowered, rather than objectified. The effect of feminist coalition-building can be seen through the knight. As a consequence for the knight's sexual assault against the maiden, when the old woman asks the Queen to allow the knight to marry her, the Queen grants it. This shows support for the broader female community's commitment to education in female values. In response to this fate, the knight begs the court and the Queen to undo his sentence, offering all his wealth and power: "Take all my goods, and let my body go," which the Queen does not allow. The knight's lack of agency, in this scene, demonstrates a role reversal, according to Carissa Harris, in juxtaposition to women's lack of agency in situations of rape.

== Adaptations ==
In the 15th-century poem The Wedding of Sir Gawain and Dame Ragnelle, Arthur's nephew Gawain goes on a nearly identical quest to discover what women truly want, after he errs in a land dispute. It is theorized that the author of the Wedding had consulted, and was responding to and elaborating on, Chaucer's "Wife of Bath's Tale."

Pier Paolo Pasolini adapted the prologue of this tale in his film The Canterbury Tales (1972). Laura Betti plays the wife of Bath and Tom Baker plays her fifth husband.

Patience Agbabi's poetry collection Telling Tales (2014) retells The Canterbury Tales from the perspective of 21st-century characters, including the Wife of Bath as Mrs Alice Ebi Bafa, a Nigerian woman.

Zadie Smith adapted and updated the prologue and story for the Kiln Theatre in Kilburn in 2019 as The Wife of Willesden, a play which ran from November 2021 to January 2022.

Joanna Quinn animated the story as a segment of The Canterbury Tales (1998-2000), a television adaptation of nine tales animated within a stop motion framing sequence.

The Wife of Bath's Prologue has been adapted by Karen Brooks as The Good Wife of Bath (2021) and by Chaucer scholar Marion Turner as The Wife of Bath: A Biography (2023).

== See also ==
- Blaesilla, on whom the tale is partly based.
- Bacon in the fabliaux – a figurative use of bacon echoed by Chaucer
