= The Wife of Willesden =

2021 play by Zadie Smith

- First edition cover
- Author: Zadie Smith
- Language: English
- Publisher: Hamish Hamilton
- Publication date: 4 November 2021
- Publication place: United Kingdom
- Media type: paperback
- Pages: 144 pp.
- ISBN: 9780241471968

The Wife of Willesden is the debut play of Zadie Smith, first published on 4 November 2021 by Hamish Hamilton. It is an adaptation of Geoffrey Chaucer's The Wife of Bath's Prologue and Tale, reimagined into present-day North London. It was first staged at London's Kiln Theatre, where it ran from 11 November 2021 to 15 January 2022.

== Background ==
Smith wrote her first play, The Wife of Willesden after learning that her borough in London, Brent, had been selected in 2018 as the 2020 London Borough of Culture. She chose to adapt "The Wife of Bath's Tale" in Geoffrey Chaucer's Canterbury Tales, recalling how she had translated Chaucer into contemporary English during her studies at Cambridge. The retelling replaces the pilgrimage with a pub crawl set in contemporary London, with the Wife of Bath becoming Alvita, a Jamaican-born British woman in her mid-50s who challenges her Auntie P's traditional Christian views on sex and marriage. Like the original tale, Alvita is a woman who has had five husbands, her experiences with them ranging from pleasant to traumatic. The majority of the piece is spent on her talking to the people in the pub, in much the way that the Wife of Bath's prologue is longer than the tale itself. To her, Alvita's voice is a common one that she heard growing up in Brent, and thus writing this play was a natural choice for the festival. The tale itself is set in early 18th-century Jamaica, where a man guilty of rape is brought before Queen Nanny of the Maroons, who decrees that his punishment is to go and find what women truly desire.

== Reception ==
The Guardian's Kate Wyver commended Smith's "clever mimicry" but felt there were moments where the play got "lost in its own tangents" as well as a "a certain sense of stagnancy" due to its faithfulness to Chaucer's verse.

Marion Turner for The Times Literary Supplement deemed the play a "triumphant work of art, an utterly riveting theatrical experience" and praised the hilarity in its writing and presentation whilst also "[engaging] powerfully with current debates about which histories matter and what Englishness and Britishness might be."

Wendy Smith of The Boston Globe praised the "vitality and sheer verbal relish" of the contemporary vernacular, writing, "The 10-syllable verse line fits contemporary speech rhythms as naturally as it did Chaucer's, and Smith's relaxed approach to rhyming emulates that of her forebear."
