= Grand Union (short story collection) =

2019 short story collection by Zadie Smith

Grand Union: Stories
- Cover of first edition
- Author: Zadie Smith
- Audio read by: Doc Brown; Zadie Smith
- Language: English
- Publisher: Hamish Hamilton
- Publication date: 3 October 2019
- Publication place: London
- Media type: Print (Hardcover)
- Pages: 256
- ISBN: 978-0-241-33702-8
- Dewey Decimal: 823/.914
- LC Class: PR6069.M59 A6 2019

Grand Union: Stories is a 2019 short story collection by Zadie Smith. It was published on 3 October 2019 by Hamish Hamilton, an imprint of Penguin Books.

== Contents ==
Grand Union contains nineteen short stories. Eleven of the stories are new and unpublished and eight were originally published in The New Yorker, The Paris Review, or Granta.

#	Title	Originally published in
1	"The Dialectic"	Previously unpublished
2	"Sentimental Education"	Previously unpublished
3	"The Lazy River"	18 and 25 December 2017 issue of The New Yorker
4	"Words and Music"	Previously unpublished
5	"Just Right"	Spring 2013 issue of Granta
6	"Parents' Morning Epiphany"	Previously unpublished
7	"Downtown"	Previously unpublished
8	"Miss Adele Amidst the Corsets"	Spring 2014 issue of The Paris Review
9	"Mood"	Previously unpublished
10	"Escape from New York"	8 and 15 June 2015 issue of The New Yorker
11	"Big Week"	Summer 2014 issue of The Paris Review
12	"Meet the President!"	12 and 19 August 2013 issue of The New Yorker
13	"Two Men Arrive in a Village"	6 and 13 June 2016 issue of The New Yorker
14	"Kelso Deconstructed"	Previously unpublished
15	"Blocked"	Previously unpublished
16	"The Canker"	Previously unpublished
17	"For the King"	Previously unpublished
18	"Now More Than Ever"	23 July 2018 issue of The New Yorker
19	"Grand Union"	Previously unpublished

== Reception ==
Publishers Weekly called the collection "smart and bewitching" and said, "Smith exercises her range without losing her wry, slightly cynical humor. Readers of all tastes will find something memorable in this collection."

Kirkus Reviews said, "Several of Smith's stories are on their ways to becoming classics."

David L. Ulin of the Los Angeles Times wrote that "Smith is at her finest" in Grand Union and praised the collection's "balance between humor and self-laceration."

Writing for Literary Hub, author John Freeman called Smith "one of our finest short story writers" and said, "The compression and swiftness of these tales are opposite skills to the ones Smith has plied in her five, wondrously different novels. Yet to watch these tales unfold is to feel a gladness that only virtuosity—and emotional depth—can ignite."

Alice O'Keeffe, writing for The Bookseller, said, "The first ever collection of short stories from the wonderful Zadie Smith is surely a must-read for her many fans."

Writing for The New York Times Book Review, author Rebecca Makkai wrote, "While the collection might not coalesce as a unit, it contains some of Smith's most vibrant, original fiction, the kind of writing she'll surely be known for."
