= The Autograph Man =

2002 novel by Zadie Smith

- First edition cover
- Author: Zadie Smith
- Language: English
- Publisher: Hamish Hamilton
- Publication date: 12 September 2002
- Publication place: United Kingdom
- Media type: paperback, hardback
- Pages: 432 pp.
- ISBN: 978-0-241-13998-1
- OCLC: 59446573

The Autograph Man, published in 2002, is the second novel by Zadie Smith. It follows the progress of a Jewish-Italian-Chinese Londoner named Alex-Li Tandem, who buys and sells autographs for a living and is obsessed with celebrities. Eventually, his obsession culminates in a meeting with the elusive American-Russian actress Kitty Alexander, a star from Hollywood's Golden Age. In 2003, the novel won the Jewish Quarterly-Wingate Literary Prize. The novel was a commercial success, but was not as well received by readers and critics as her previous and first novel, White Teeth (2000). Smith has stated that before she started work on The Autograph Man she had writer's block.

== Plot summary ==
Alex-Li Tandem is a 28-year-old Anglo-Chinese-Jewish man living in the fictional London suburb of Mountjoy. Overweight, an alcoholic, and given to experimentation with psychedelics, Alex is nonetheless popular among his friends, including Adam, a Beta Israel Jew whose sister, Esther, Alex has been dating since he was eighteen; Rubenfine, a socially conservative, uptight rabbi; and Joseph, a closeted homosexual who harbors a secret lust for Alex. Joseph and Alex's friendship was cemented at a wrestling match when the pair were children, and where Joseph introduced Adam to the hobby of autograph collecting. Alex's father's death the same night from metastasized brain cancer has created a link in Alex's mind between autographs and the possibility of immortality, and in adulthood become a professional collectibles dealer. Alex further hopes to find his own immortality and success as a published writer, painstakingly compiling a book based on Lenny Bruce's 'Jewish or Goyische' routine, cataloging what objects, customs, and aspects of life can be divided into either Jewish or non-Jewish categories. Alex hopes to one day obtain the autograph of Kitty Alexander, an obscure Russian-American leading woman of a small handful of 1940s films. Learning the elderly Kitty is still alive and living in seclusion in New York, Alex has been sending her fan mail for years, never receiving a reply.

As the anniversary of Alex's father's death approaches, his friends encourage him to recite the Mourner's Kaddish in honor of his Yahrzeit. The impending anniversary pushes Alex further into drug and alcohol abuse, and he begins having an affair with a girl named Boot who buys collectibles from his shop. Joseph exposes the affair to Esther, straining their relationship. In the throes of a drug binge, Alex produces an autographed photo of Kitty Alexander he claims to have received in the mail; his friends write it off as a forgery of his own making. Alex initially believes them right, until another letter arrives; determined to meet Kitty, he leaves for a collectibles' convention in New York City, abandoning Esther on the day she's having open heart surgery to repair her faulty pacemaker.

In New York, Alex meets Kitty and learns that her manager Marty has been keeping her in seclusion for years out of a deluded obsession with her; Kitty discovered Alex's letters in a trove of hidden mail he's been keeping in her home. Having been living as a virtual prisoner, Kitty has no clue of the value of her autograph on the collectors' market or the cult of celebrity that's grown up around her films. Alex conspires to help Kitty escape her home and smuggles her out of the country back to England with him. Marty, in a fit of pique, files a false report with the press that Kitty has died.

Promising to correct the news, Alex instead takes advantage of public mourning around Kitty's death to present a number of items she had given to him at a prestigious London auction house. Fast tracking the sale, Alex makes several hundred thousand pounds from buyers believing Kitty is dead. Initially intending to keep his sizable brokerage fee for himself, Alex instead gifts it to a dying fellow autograph man whose lonely, dissolute life Alex sees as his own worst case scenario.

Having learned of his ruse, Kitty and Esther confront Alex. Alex gives Kitty her share of the earnings, but she tells him they can no longer have a relationship; Esther similarly dumps Alex. With his father's Yahrzeit approaching, Alex goes to a pub and becomes black-out drunk after attempting to binge drink his way through alcohols according to the letters of the alphabet. Joseph, Adam, and Rubinfine discover Alex on a sidewalk and get him home; Alex wonders why people remain friends with him when he contributes nothing positive to their lives.

The next morning, a still drunk and slovenly Alex recites the Mourner's Kaddish among a crowd of strangers at a synagogue, contemplating the stories of their lives.

== Reception ==
As with her first novel, White Teeth, the critic James Wood was highly critical. He said: "this is the closest a contemporary British writer has come to sounding like a contemporary American writer – the result is disturbingly mutant." He denounced her "cute digest chapter headings", her "silly epigraphs", her "informational interpolations" and her vacant main character. He also felt that the novel's "obsession" with Jewishness, and the way in which the subject was treated, made it clear that the book was by a non-Jew. Furthermore, he said that "she seems to like [the protagonist] Alex much more than we do", and he speculated that the character was actually a reflection of herself. At the conclusion, he conceded that certain sentences displayed brilliance, but that these were not enough to save the novel.
