= Bacon in fabliaux =

Use of bacon in medieval French fabliaux

In fabliaux – short, comic Old French narrative verse tales – bacon is one of the most commonly consumed foodstuffs, alongside capons and geese, cakes, bread, and wine. Within these stories, bacon can function both as an everyday food and as a symbol associated with clerical corruption, greed, gluttony, or sexuality.

== Du provost a l'aumuche ==
In some tales, bacon, and similarly pork and lard, are associated with corrupt clergy members as symbols of gluttony, greed, and lust. For example, in Du provost a l'aumuche a provost hides some bacon that he has stolen from a feast prepared for his master under his hat (the "aumuche" of the title, a large fur hat), but is caught and beaten after the bacon fat, melted by a nearby fire, starts to drip down his head. This parallels Galbert of Bruges's tale of the Murder of Charles the Good.

Du provost a l'aumuche is 132 lines long and tells the tale of a rich knight who, having left his provost, a "low fellow and a rascal" named Gervais, in charge when he goes on a pilgrimage to Santiago de Compostela, returns home and sends word ahead to the provost to have a feast prepared. The provost arrives at the feast early and, spying a piece of salt pork in a shared dish, steals it and hides it in his aumuche while the person with whom he shares the dish has his back turned to talk to someone else. Placing the aumuche on his head, all is well until a fire behind him is stoked by a servant, at which point the fat melts and begins dripping down him. The theft is discovered when a server, inconvenienced by the hat, removes it from the provost's head, whereupon the pork falls out. The provost tries to escape from the feast, but is caught, violently beaten, and then thrown out.

Several items in the fabliau run parallel to Galbert's tale, which likewise features a provost named Bertulf with an aumuche: the name "Erembaut Brache-huche", the fabliau provost's father; the high status and high regard of their masters; the masters both going on pilgrimages; and the provosts being motivated by greed for food (in the fabliau) or for power (in the Murder). A final parallel is the fates of both provosts: Gervais is violently punished, while Bertulf is stripped, dragged around, pelted with mud and stones, and then hanged naked at Ypres, where a mob with hooks and clubs assaults him. Gervais is pelted with hot coals by cooks, assaulted by the crowd of servants at the feast, and dragged outside and thrown in a ditch with a dead dog, which parallels the medieval practice of hanging with dogs.

== De Haimet et de Barat et Travers ==
In De Haimet et de Barat et Travers, two thieves, the eponymous brothers Haimet and Barat, and a peasant, farcically steal and then steal back a piece of bacon repeatedly.

His wife warns the peasant Travers that she believes misfortune is coming their way, and hides a piece of bacon that he knows the brother thieves (who, in the prologue to the tale, have had a thieving competition in which Haimet steals the eggs out of a bird's nest in a tree and Barat steals his trousers from him whilst he is doing it) have their eyes upon. Nonetheless, the brothers manage to steal the bacon, but while they are cooking it on a fire in the forest, Travers steals it back, scaring them away by pretending to be a ghost. The tale then proceeds to recount the bacon being stolen back and forth between the two parties.

In this fabliau, the word "bacon" denotes pork products in a general fashion, just as colloquially in Modern French "cochon" can denote both the animal per se and "a bit of pig", its preserved meat.

== Priests instead of stolen bacon ==
In two tales of circulating bodies, Du Segretain Moine and Du Prestre qu'on porte, dead priests end up substituted for stolen bacon.

In the first, the body of a priest killed by a watchful husband is hidden in the latrine of a monastery, dutifully returned by the prior, hidden again by the husband, this time in a farmer's manure pile in a sack used by thieves for stolen bacon, retrieved by the thieves thinking that it is their bacon, returned by them to where they stole the bacon from, and finally strapped to a horse and sent to the monastery by the bacon's original owner, a farmer named Thibault. The horse, which stumbles on its way to the monastery, finally gets the blame for the priest's death.

In the second, the body circulates from the doorstep of a neighbor, to a horse, to the house of a peasant, to a sack, and into the hands of thieves who have stolen some bacon. The thieves place it where the bacon was, from where it is removed by a tavernkeeper, put in the linen chest of a bishop, and thence placed in the bishop's bed whilst he is asleep by a prior. In fright when he awakes to find it there, the bishop strikes the body and, assuming that he killed the priest, quietly finally buries the body.

== Figurative bacon ==
In Le Meunier et les ii Clers, "bacon" figuratively refers to a young woman in a sexual sense, as one of the characters encourages his companion to take his "share" of a young woman with whom he has just had sex. This is a sense for the word that Geoffrey Chaucer, who would have been familiar with the usage (not least because Le Meunier et les ii Clers is a clear precursor of his "Reeve's Tale"), also uses in his "Wife of Bath's Tale".

== See also ==
- Fabliau
- Bacon
- Medieval cuisine
- Food and sexuality
