= White Teeth =

2000 debut novel by Zadie Smith

- First edition
- Author: Zadie Smith
- Language: English
- Genre: Postcolonial literature
- Publisher: Hamish Hamilton
- Publication date: 27 January 2000
- Publication place: United Kingdom
- Media type: Print (Hardcover)
- Pages: 480
- ISBN: 978-0-241-13997-4
- OCLC: 43501880
- Dewey Decimal: 823/.914 21
- LC Class: PR6069.M59 W47 2000b

White Teeth is the 2000 debut novel by British author Zadie Smith. It focuses on the later lives of two wartime friends—the Bangladeshi Samad Iqbal and the Englishman Archie Jones—and their families in London. The novel centres on Britain's relationship with immigrants from the British Commonwealth.

White Teeth won multiple honours, including the 2000 James Tait Black Memorial Prize for fiction, the 2000 Whitbread Book Award in the category of best first novel, the Guardian First Book Award, the Commonwealth Writers First Book Prize, and the Betty Trask Award. Time magazine included the novel in its list of the 100 Best English-language Novels from 1923 to 2005. In 2022, it was included on the "Big Jubilee Read" list of 70 books by Commonwealth authors, selected to celebrate the Platinum Jubilee of Elizabeth II.

== Plot ==
On New Year's Day 1975, Archie Jones, a 47-year-old Englishman whose disturbed Italian wife has just walked out on him, attempts to take his own life by gassing himself in his car when a chance interruption causes him to change his mind. Filled with a fresh enthusiasm for life, Archie flips a coin and then finds his way into the aftermath of a New Year's Eve party. There he meets the much-younger Clara Bowden, a Jamaican woman whose mother, Hortense, is a devout Jehovah's Witness. Clara had been interested in the unattractive, anti-social Ryan Topps, but their relationship falls apart after Ryan becomes a member of the Jehovah's Witnesses and grows close to her mother. Archie and Clara are soon married and have a daughter, Irie, who grows up to be intelligent but with low self-confidence due to her weight and insecurity about her mixed-race identity.

Also living in Willesden, London, is Archie's best friend Samad Iqbal, a Bengali Muslim from Bangladesh; the two men spend much of their time at the O'Connell's pub arguing with the owner, Abdul-Mickey, a Muslim whose entire extended family all suffer from cystic acne. Archie and Samad met in 1945 when they were part of a tank crew inching through Europe in the final days of World War II, though they missed out on the action. Their friendship was cemented when Archie, acting at Samad's behest, apparently executed an escaped Nazi scientist whom they had been tasked with turning over to the authorities. Following the war, Samad emigrated to Britain and married Alsana Iqbal, née Alsana Begum, or "Miss Alsana", in a traditional arranged marriage. Samad is a downtrodden waiter in a West End curry house, and is obsessed by the history of his supposed but unlikely great-grandfather, Mangal Pandey, a Hindu soldier from Uttar Pradesh, not Bengal, who is famous for firing the first shot of the Indian Rebellion of 1857 (though he missed and was executed).

Samad and Alsana have twin boys, Magid and Millat, who are the same age as Irie. Samad in particular finds it difficult to maintain his devotion to Islam in an English life; he is continually tormented by what he sees as the effects of this cultural conflict upon his own moral character—his Muslim values are corrupted by his compulsive masturbation, beer drinking, and his affair with his children's music teacher, Poppy Burt-Jones. In an attempt to preserve his traditional beliefs, he sends 10-year-old Magid to Bangladesh in the hope that he will grow up properly under the teachings of Islam. From then on, the lives of the two boys follow very different paths. To Samad's fury, Magid becomes an Anglicised atheist and devotes his life to science. Millat, meanwhile, pursues a rebellious path of womanising, drinking, and petty hooliganism—as well as harbouring a love of mob movies such as The Godfather and Goodfellas. Angry at his people's marginalisation in English society, Millat demonstrates against Salman Rushdie for his novel The Satanic Verses in 1989 and eventually pledges himself to a militant Muslim fundamentalist brotherhood known as "Keepers of the Eternal and Victorious Islamic Nation" (KEVIN).

The lives of the Joneses and Iqbals intertwine with that of the white, middle-class Chalfens, a lapsed Jewish-Catholic family of Oxbridge-educated intellectuals who typify a distinctive strain of North London liberal trendiness and who are recruited by Irie and Millat's school to tutor them after the pair are caught smoking marijuana. The father, Marcus Chalfen, is a university lecturer and geneticist working on a controversial 'FutureMouse' project in which he introduces chemical carcinogens into the body of a mouse and is thus able to observe the progression of a tumour in living tissue. By re-engineering the actual genome and watching cancers progress at pre-determined times, Marcus believes he is eliminating the random. The mother, Joyce Chalfen, is a horticulturist and part-time housewife with an often entirely misguided desire to mother and 'heal' Millat as if he were one of her plants. To some extent, the Chalfen family provides a safe haven as they (believe themselves to) accept and understand the turbulent lives of Irie, Magid, and Millat. Irie finds herself working for Marcus as a secretary; Marcus takes an intellectual interest in Magid and subsidizes his flight home, and even Millat's grades slightly improve.

However, both Alsana and Clara become suspicious of their children constantly spending time at the Chalfens', and Joyce and Marcus's arrogance antagonize both Clara and the Iqbal family. The Chalfens' actions also come at the expense of their own son, Joshua, whose difficulties are ignored by his parents. Originally a well-moulded "Chalfenist", Joshua rebels against his father and his background by joining the radical animal rights group "Fighting Animal Torture and Exploitation" (FATE). Meanwhile, after his return from Bangladesh, Magid works as Marcus's research assistant on the FutureMouse project, while Millat becomes further involved in KEVIN. Irie, who has been attracted to Millat since adolescence, has a one-night-stand with him, only for him to reject her due to his KEVIN-inspired beliefs about ritual purity. Dejected, Irie immediately seduces Magid. This causes her to become pregnant, but she is left unsure of the child's paternity, as the brothers are identical twins and therefore share the same DNA.

The strands of the narrative grow closer as Millat and KEVIN, Joshua and FATE, and Clara's mother Hortense and the Jehovah's Witnesses all plan to demonstrate their opposition to Marcus's FutureMouse—which they view as an evil interference with their own religious and ethical beliefs—at its exhibition on New Year's Eve, 1992. At the Perret Institute, Hortense and the other Jehovah's Witnesses sing loudly in front of the building. Samad goes out to hush them, but when he arrives, he cannot summon the heart to make them stop. When he returns, he realizes that the founder of the Perret Institute and the oldest scientist on Marcus Chalfen's panel is Dr. Perret, the Nazi he captured during World War II. Enraged that Archie did not kill him all those years ago, Samad runs over and begins cursing Archie. Just then, Millat advances on the table of scientists with a gun. Not wanting Millat to become a murderer, Archie jumps in front of him and takes a bullet in the thigh. As he falls, he crushes the mouse's glass cage, and it escapes.

At the novel's end, the narrator presents us with different "end games" in the style of a television series finale: since witnesses identify both as the culprit, Magid and Millat are both sentenced to community service working at a new garden project of Joyce's. Joshua and Irie end up together and join Hortense in Jamaica in the year 2000 with Irie's daughter, who remains ignorant of her true parentage and regards Magid and Millat as her uncles. Mickey opens up the previously men-only O'Connell's pub to women, and Archie and Samad finally invite their wives along with them to celebrate the new millennium.

== Major characters ==
=== Alfred Archibald Jones ===
Archie is mediocre and indecisive, preferring to make his most important decisions with the flip of a coin. Archie's ex-wife is Ophelia Diagilo, whom he supposedly drove insane with his mediocrity. He later marries Clara, a Jamaican woman less than half his age, with whom he has a daughter, Irie. Archie's best friend is Samad Iqbal. The two men served together in World War II in the British Army and frequently visit O'Connell's pub.

=== Samad Miah Iqbal ===
Archie's best friend, a middle-aged World War II veteran with a crippled right hand. Samad was born in Bangladesh and met Archie when they were soldiers in Eastern Europe. He works as a waiter at an Indian restaurant, where he receives few tips. His wife is Alsana Begum, and his twin sons are Magid and Millat. More than anything, Samad wants his sons to grow into religious, traditional Bengali Muslim men. To ensure this, he goes to great lengths, even sending Magid to be raised in Bangladesh (for all intents and purposes, this was a kidnapping).

=== Clara Bowden ===
Clara Jones, née Bowden, was an awkward, unpopular Jehovah's Witness who spent her adolescence canvassing door-to-door. When she meets the equally unappealing Ryan Topps, she abandons her religion and takes up his rebellious ways, though Ryan becomes a staunch Jehovah's Witness himself. When Ryan and Clara crash into a tree on Ryan's scooter, Clara's top teeth are knocked out. She meets Archie Jones and marries him, even though she finds him unimpressive and he is more than twice her age. Archie and Clara have a daughter named Irie.

=== Alsana Begum ===
Alsana Iqbal, née Begum, is the young wife of Samad Iqbal, to whom she was promised before her birth. They have twin sons, Magid and Millat. To help pay bills, she sews clothing on her home sewing machine for an S&M shop called Domination in Soho. Although charismatic and judgmental by nature, she thinks marriage is best handled with silence. However, she has a volcanic temper and generally wins fights with Samad by injuring him.

=== Irie Ambrosia Jones ===
Irie—whose name means "OK, cool, peaceful" in Patois—is the daughter of Clara and Archie Jones. Irie has been friends with Magid and Millat Iqbal since birth. After struggling with her sexuality and racial identity, Irie finds answers in her grandmother, Hortense Bowden. She resolves to go into the field of dentistry and, despite her best efforts to prevent it, ends up with Joshua Chalfen. Having slept with both Magid and Millat, Irie gives birth to a daughter whose father can never be known, as the twins have exactly the same DNA.

Irie is mentioned in passing in two other novels by Zadie Smith, Swing Time and NW.

=== Millat Zulfikar Iqbal ===
Millat, born two minutes later than his twin brother Magid, is the younger son of Samad and Alsana. After Magid is sent to Bangladesh, Millat comes into his own as a trouble-making, pot-smoking, womanising rebel. However, Millat eventually rejects this lifestyle in favour of fundamentalist Islam, becoming a major driving force of KEVIN. At the FutureMouse conference, he tries to shoot Dr Perret, but instead shoots Archie in the thigh. Millat may or may not be the father of Irie's baby.

=== Magid Mahfooz Murshed Mubtasim Iqbal ===
Magid is the elder son of Samad and Alsana and the twin brother of Millat. Magid is intellectually precocious and insists on dressing and acting like an adult, even at a very young age. Samad essentially kidnaps Magid and sends him to be raised traditionally in Bangladesh. When he finally returns to London, he joins Marcus Chalfen's FutureMouse programme. Magid is fascinated by the certainty of fate genetic engineering offers, and by having the power to choose another creature's path, as his was chosen for him. Magid may or may not be the father of Irie's baby.

=== Marcus Chalfen ===
Marcus Chalfen is a Jewish genetic engineer and husband of Joyce Chalfen. His controversial FutureMouse experiment involves genetically altering a mouse so that it develops cancers at specific times and sites. Marcus loses interest in mentoring Irie when he begins corresponding with Magid, and condescendingly advises that Irie is only intelligent enough to be a dentist.

=== Joyce Chalfen ===
Joyce is a horticulturalist, writer, and the wife of Marcus Chalfen. She has four sons, all of whom adore her fiercely. Joyce is a natural nurturer and constantly feels the need to care for things and people. From the moment they meet, Millat entrances Joyce, and she feels the need to mother him and pander to his needs, which Millat exploits.

=== Joshua Chalfen ===
Joshua is the son of Joyce and Marcus Chalfen. Originally interested in his studies at Glenard Oak School, Joshua rebels against the Chalfens (particularly his father) by joining the animal-rights group FATE. Joshua has a long-standing crush on Irie and, later, on Joely, who, along with husband Crispin head the group. He stays in FATE largely as an excuse to remain close to her.

== Reception ==
Though, generally, the book was critically acclaimed, the critic James Wood was largely hostile, while reserving a few moments for praise. The novel has since been the subject of numerous scholarly articles.

In 2019, the novel was ranked 39th on The Guardian's list of the 100 best books of the 21st century. On 5 November 2019, BBC News included White Teeth on its list of the 100 most influential novels.

== Adaptations ==
A four-part television adaptation of the novel was made and broadcast on Channel 4 in 2002, White Teeth. It was directed by Julian Jarrold, starring Om Puri as Samad and Phil Davis as Archie. Each episode focuses on a major male character as he encounters a turning point in his life: "The Peculiar Second Marriage of Archie Jones", "The Temptation of Samad Iqbal", "The Trouble With Millat", and "The Return of Magid Iqbal".

In 2018, London's Kiln Theatre announced the world premiere of Stephen Sharkey's stage adaptation of the novel. Directed by the venue's Artistic Director Indhu Rubasingham, the production featured 13 original songs by Paul Englishby and starred Tony Jayawardena as Samad, Richard Lumsden as Archie and Ayesha Antoine as Irie.

== See also ==
- Hysterical realism
- Mangal Pandey
- Historiographical metafiction
