= Feel Free (Smith book) =

2018 book of essays by Zadie Smith

Feel Free: Essays
- Cover of first edition
- Author: Zadie Smith
- Audio read by: Nikki Amuka-Bird
- Language: English
- Genre: Essay collection
- Publisher: Hamish Hamilton
- Publication date: 8 February 2018
- Publication place: United Kingdom
- Media type: Print (Hardcover)
- Pages: 464
- Awards: 2018 National Book Critics Circle Award for Criticism
- ISBN: 978-0241146897

Feel Free: Essays is a 2018 book of essays by Zadie Smith. It was published on 8 February 2018 by Hamish Hamilton, an imprint of Penguin Books. It has been described as "thoroughly resplendent" by Maria Popova, who writes: "Smith applies her formidable mind in language to subjects as varied as music, the connection between dancing and writing, climate change, Brexit, the nature of joy, and the confusions of personhood in the age of social media."

Smith borrowed the title from Nick Laird, her husband, who has also published a collection of poems by the same name.

== Reception ==
Feel Free won the 2018 National Book Critics Circle Award for criticism. The Times named it among 2018's best literary nonfiction.
