= Nick Laird =

Northern Irish novelist and poet

Nick Laird FRSL
- Born: 1975 (age 50–51); Cookstown, County Tyrone, Northern Ireland
- Education: Sidney Sussex College, Cambridge
- Occupations: Novelist, poet
- Spouse: Zadie Smith (m. 2004)
- Children: 2
- Relatives: Doc Brown (brother-in-law)
- Writing career
- Period: 2005–present

Nicholas Laird FRSL (born 1975) is a Northern Irish novelist and poet.

== Education ==
Laird was born in Cookstown, County Tyrone, where he attended the local comprehensive school. He then gained entry to Sidney Sussex College, Cambridge, where he initially studied Law but switched to English, in which he attained a first-class degree and won the Arthur Quiller-Couch Award for Creative Writing.

He went on to work at the law firm Allen & Overy in London for six years, before leaving to concentrate on his writing.

== Personal life ==
Laird met Zadie Smith at Cambridge University. They married in 2004 in the Chapel of King's College, Cambridge. Smith dedicated her third novel, On Beauty, to "my dear Laird." The couple lived in Rome from November 2006 to 2007 and now live in New York City and Queen's Park, London. They have two children.

== Poetry ==
=== To a Fault ===
To a Fault is Laird's first collection of poems, and was nominated for the Forward Prize for Best First Collection. To a Fault was published by Faber and Faber in January 2005.

=== On Purpose ===
On Purpose is his follow-up book of poems, published also by Faber and Faber in 2007. The collection further explores the concept of relationships, loosely based on the tract The Art of War by Sun Tzu. The book won the Somerset Maugham Award and the Geoffrey Faber Memorial Prize in 2008.

=== Go Giants ===
Go Giants is Laird's third collection, published by Faber and Faber in 2015.

=== Feel Free ===
Laird's fourth collection, published by Faber and Faber in August 2018, was shortlisted for the 2018 T. S. Eliot Prize.

== Novels ==
=== Utterly Monkey ===
Utterly Monkey was published in May 2005 by Fourth Estate, and by Harper Perennial in the US. It follows the relationship of two childhood friends from Northern Ireland. One of them, Danny, grows up to be a lawyer after attaining an education in London, while the other, Geordie, works as a labourer and does not pursue extensive studies after school. Laird has described Geordie as "more feckless than Danny" and "a kind of a drifter."

The novel also explores the ongoing political and military conflict within Northern Ireland known as The Troubles. When asked whether or not Americans can comprehend and identify with the experiences of people in Northern Ireland, Laird replied: "I think they can, but I don't think they do," and cited the "low level of discourse" that he has encountered in regard to this subject when he travels to America.

=== Glover's Mistake ===
Review from The New York Times:

A blog called The Damp Review figures prominently in Nick Laird's new novel. On it David Pinner, once an art student, now a teacher who dabbles in cultural criticism, writes about "whatever took his fancy. Or didn't," Mr. Laird writes. "He found it easier to write on disappointments. Hatreds, easier still." At the beginning of the book David goes to an art opening for Ruth Marks, a feminist American artist who is in London on a yearlong residency. Ruth was once David's teacher, and they strike up a friendship. But Ruth strikes up more with David's much-younger roommate, James Glover, who plays the innocent to David's cynic. And, as the romance between Ruth and James develops, so does David's anger and unhappiness. Mr. Laird is also a poet, a day job he reveals in sentences like "David realized he'd been unconsciously pushing his nails into his palms, leaving little red falciform marks."

The Village Voice also featured the book.

=== Modern Gods ===
Published in 2017.

== Influences and themes ==
In a January 2006 appearance on The Leonard Lopate Show, Laird explained how travelling out of Northern Ireland for education in Cambridge had expanded his horizons and opened him up to opportunities that he believes would have otherwise been closed to him: "I met a Jewish person for the first time. I met a black person for the first time." He also described the freedom that moving away from Northern Ireland gave him with respect to adopting a new, or broader, identity. "It does mean freedom in a way to reinvent."

One of the themes in Laird's writing is the interpersonal relationships forged between men and women, and in the Lopate interview, he cited Ian McEwan and Nick Hornby as writers he admired for their ability to weave this element into their work. Laird is one of the post-Troubles young novelists from Belfast, who emerged to articulate the identity of the generation whose childhoods were experienced amid some of the region's worst violence, who matured in an era of problematic reconciliation. Along with Robert McLiam Wilson, whose novel Eureka Street was widely acclaimed, the most successful young novelists from Belfast are Glenn Patterson, author of six novels and a collection of essays, and Colin Bateman, a prolific and commercially successful author of comic novels about contemporary Belfast including Divorcing Jack.

Laird cited the enduring influence of Irish poet Seamus Heaney on his life and work, tracing his love of literature back to reading some of Heaney's early work, which he claimed: "seems to be written out of the same place that you live".

== Recognition and prizes ==
To a Fault and Utterly Monkey were both long-listed for the inaugural Dylan Thomas Prize. To a Fault won the Jerwood Aldeburgh Prize, the Ireland Chair for Poetry Award and the Rupert and Eithne Strong Award. It was also shortlisted for the Forward Poetry Prize for First Collection, shortlisted for the Poetry Now Award in 2006, and longlisted for the Guardian First Book Award.

Laird won the Eric Gregory Award in 2004 and also received the Rooney Prize for Irish Literature in 2005. Utterly Monkey won the Betty Trask Prize for best first novel in 2005. It was also shortlisted for the Commonwealth Best First Novel award, the Irish Novel of the Year award, and the Kerry Group Listowel Fiction Prize. On Purpose won a Somerset Maugham Award and the Geoffrey Faber Memorial Prize in 2007.

He participated in the Bush Theatre's 2011 project Sixty Six Books, with a piece he wrote based upon a book of the King James Bible.

Laird was elected a Fellow of the Royal Society of Literature in 2013. In 2024 he was one of the judges of the inaugural PEN Heaney Prize.

== Bibliography ==
=== Novels ===
- Laird, Nick (2005). Utterly monkey. London: Fourth Estate.
- — (2009). Glover's mistake. London: Fourth Estate.
- — (2017). Modern gods. London: Fourth Estate.

=== Children's books ===
- Smith, Zadie & Nick Laird (2021). Weirdo. Illustrated by Magenta Fox. London: Puffin.

=== Poetry ===
Collections

- Laird, Nick (2005). To a fault. London: Faber and Faber.
- — (2007). On purpose. London: Faber and Faber.
- — (2013). Go Giants. London: Faber and Faber.
- — (2018). Feel free. London: Faber and Faber.
- — (2023). Up late. London: Faber and Faber.

Anthologies (as contributor)

- Reza Mohammadi (2019). "Smoke". In Schwepcke, Barbara & Bill Swainson (eds.). A new Divan : a lyrical dialogue between East & West. English version by Nick Laird. London: Gingko.

List of poems

Title	Year	First published	Reprinted/collected
User	2015	Laird, Nick (13 April 2015). "User". The New Yorker. 91 (8): 58.	
La Méditerranée	2017	Laird, Nick (30 October 2017). "La Méditerranée". The New Yorker. 93 (34): 44–45.	

== See also ==
- List of Northern Irish writers
