= Zadie Smith =

British writer (born 1975)

Zadie Smith FRSL
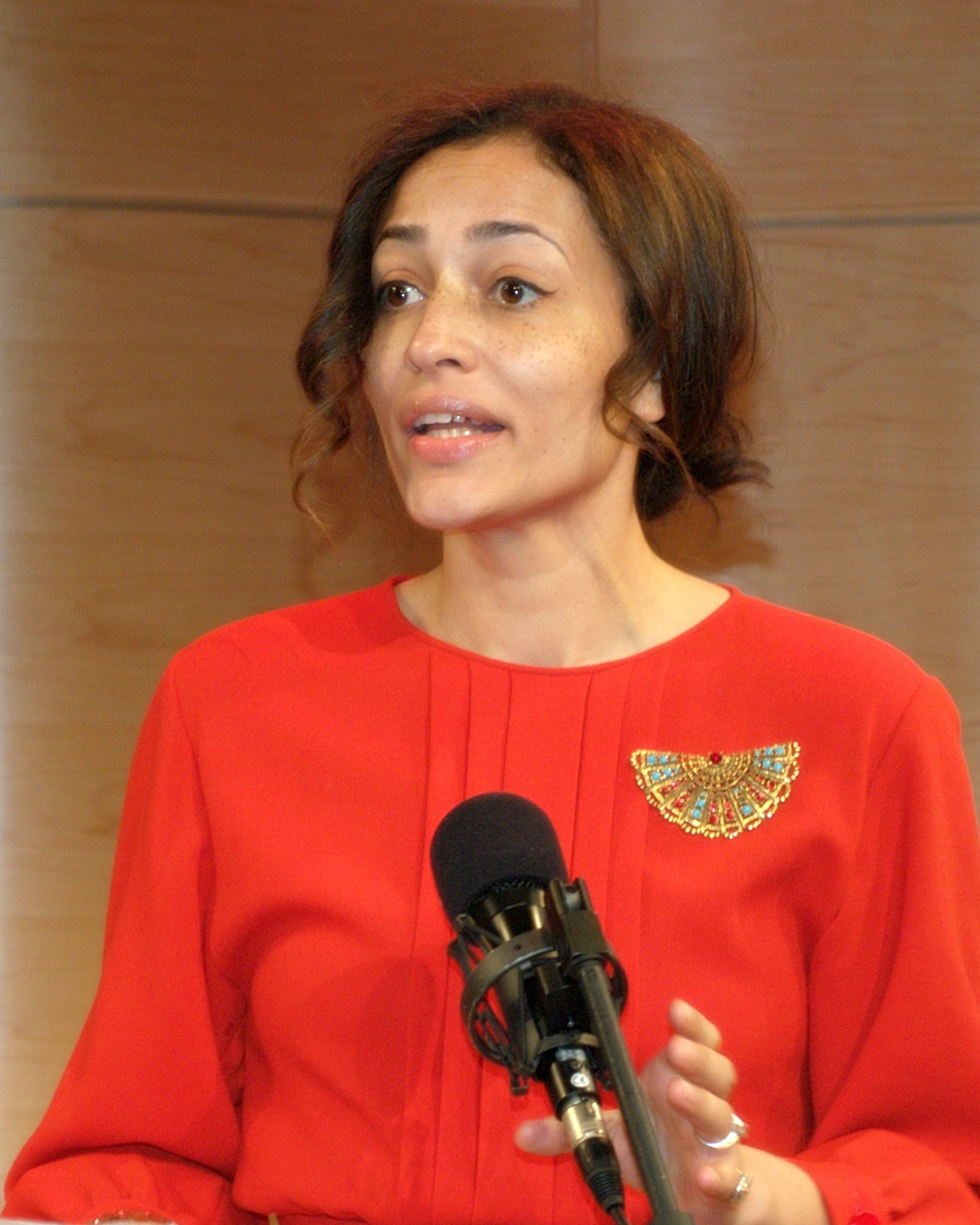
- Smith announcing the 2010 National Book Critics Circle award finalists in fiction
- Born: Sadie Smith; 25 October 1975 (age 51); London, England
- Education: King's College, Cambridge (BA)
- Occupations: Novelist; professor
- Spouse: Nick Laird (m. 2004)
- Children: 2
- Relatives: Ben Bailey Smith (brother)
- Writing career
- Period: 2000–present
- Notable works: White Teeth (2000); On Beauty (2005); NW (2012); Swing Time (2016)
- Movements: Realism; Postmodernism; Hysterical realism; New Sincerity
- Zadie Smith's voice Recorded September 2013 from the BBC Radio 4 programme Desert Island Discs
- Website: www.zadiesmith.com

Zadie Smith FRSL (born Sadie Smith; 25 October 1975) is an English novelist, essayist, and short-story writer. Her debut novel, White Teeth, published in 2000, was an immediate best-seller and won a number of awards. Smith became a tenured professor in the creative writing faculty of New York University in September 2010.

== Early life and education ==
Zadie Smith was born on 25 October 1975 in Willesden, north-west London, to a Jamaican mother, Yvonne Bailey, and an English father, Harvey Smith, who was 30 years his wife's senior. At the age of 14, she changed her name from Sadie to Zadie.

Smith's mother grew up in Jamaica and emigrated to England in 1969. Smith's parents divorced when she was a teenager. She has a half-sister, a half-brother, and two younger brothers (one is the rapper and stand-up comedian Doc Brown, and the other is the rapper Luc Skyz). As a child, Smith was fond of tap dancing, and in her teenage years, she considered a career in musical theatre. While at university, she earned money as a jazz singer, and wanted to become a journalist.

Smith attended the local schools, Malorees Junior School and Hampstead School, followed by the University of Cambridge where she studied English literature as an undergraduate at King's College, Cambridge. In an interview with The Guardian in 2000, Smith corrected a newspaper assertion that she left Cambridge with a double First. "Actually, I got a Third in my Part Ones," she said. She graduated with upper second-class honours. While at university, she auditioned unsuccessfully for the amateur theatre and comedy group Cambridge Footlights.

At Cambridge, Smith published a number of short stories in a collection of new student writing called The Mays Anthology. They attracted the attention of a publisher, who offered her a contract for her first novel. She decided to contact a literary agent and was taken on by A. P. Watt. Smith returned to guest-edit the anthology in 2001.

== Career ==
Smith's debut novel, White Teeth, was introduced to the publishing world in 1997 before it was completed. On the basis of a partial manuscript, an auction for the rights began, which was won by Hamish Hamilton. Smith completed White Teeth during her final year at the University of Cambridge. Published in 2000, the novel immediately became a best-seller and received much acclaim. It was praised internationally and won a number of awards, among them the James Tait Black Memorial Prize and the Betty Trask Award. The novel was adapted for television in 2002.

In July 2000, Smith's debut work was discussed in a controversial essay of literary criticism by James Wood entitled "Human, All Too Inhuman", where Wood critiques the novel as part of a contemporary genre of hysterical realism where "'[i]nformation has become the new character" and human feeling is absent from contemporary fiction. In an article for The Guardian in October 2001, Smith responded to the criticism by agreeing with the accuracy of the term and with Wood's underlying argument that "any novel that aims at hysteria will now be effortlessly outstripped". However, she rejected her debut being categorised alongside major authors such as David Foster Wallace, Salman Rushdie, and Don DeLillo, and the dismissal of their own innovations on the basis of being "hysterical realism". Responding earnestly to Wood's concerns about contemporary literature and culture, Smith described her own anxieties as a writer and argued that fiction should be "not a division of head and heart, but the useful employment of both".

Smith served as writer-in-residence at the Institute of Contemporary Arts (ICA) in London and subsequently published, as editor, an anthology of sex writing, Piece of Flesh, as the culmination of this role.

Smith's second novel, The Autograph Man, was published in 2002 and was a commercial success, although it was not as well received by critics as White Teeth.

After the publication of The Autograph Man, Smith visited the United States as a Fellow of the Radcliffe Institute for Advanced Study at Harvard University. She started work on a still-unreleased book of essays, The Morality of the Novel (a.k.a. Fail Better), in which she considers a selection of 20th-century writers through the lens of moral philosophy. Some portions of this book presumably appear in the essay collection Changing My Mind, published in November 2009.

Smith's third novel, On Beauty, was published in September 2005. It is set largely in and around Greater Boston. It attracted more acclaim than The Autograph Man: it was shortlisted for the Man Booker Prize, and won the 2006 Orange Prize for Fiction and the Anisfield-Wolf Book Award.

Later in the same year, Smith published Martha and Hanwell, a book that pairs two short stories about two troubled characters, originally published in Granta and The New Yorker respectively. Penguin published Martha and Hanwell with a new introduction by the author as part of their pocket series to celebrate their 70th birthday. The first story, "Martha, Martha", deals with Smith's familiar themes of race and postcolonial identity, while "Hanwell in Hell" is about a man struggling to cope with the death of his wife.

In December 2008, she guest-edited the BBC Radio 4 Today programme.

After teaching fiction at Columbia University School of the Arts, Smith joined New York University as a tenured professor of fiction in 2010.

Between March and October 2011, Smith was the monthly New Books reviewer for Harper's Magazine. She is also a frequent contributor to The New York Review of Books. In 2010, The Guardian newspaper asked Smith for her "10 rules for writing fiction". Among them she declared: "Tell the truth through whichever veil comes to hand – but tell it. Resign yourself to the lifelong sadness that comes from never being satisfied."

Smith's novel NW was published in 2012. Set in the Kilburn area of north-west London, the title being a reference to the local postcode, NW6, the novel was shortlisted for the Royal Society of Literature's Ondaatje Prize and the Women's Prize for Fiction. NW was made into a BBC television film with the same title, directed by Saul Dibb and adapted by Rachel Bennette. Starring Nikki Amuka-Bird and Phoebe Fox, the TV adaptation was broadcast on BBC Two on 14 November 2016.

In September 2013, Smith appeared on BBC Radio 4's Desert Island Discs, with her book choice being Marcel Proust's À la recherche du temps perdu.

In 2015, it was announced that Smith, along with her husband Nick Laird, was writing the screenplay for a science fiction movie to be directed by French filmmaker Claire Denis. Smith later said that her involvement in the film, titled High Life, had been overstated and that she had simply helped to polish the English dialogue for the film.

Smith's fifth novel, Swing Time, was published in November 2016. It drew inspiration from Smith's childhood love of tap dancing. It was longlisted for the Man Booker Prize 2017.

Smith is a contributor to Margaret Busby's 2019 anthology New Daughters of Africa (as is her mother Yvonne Bailey-Smith).

Smith's first collection of short stories, Grand Union, was published on 8 October 2019. In 2020, she published six essays in a collection entitled Intimations, the royalties from which she said she would be donating to the Equal Justice Initiative and New York's COVID-19 emergency relief fund.

In 2021, Smith debuted her first play, The Wife of Willesden, which she wrote after learning that her borough in London, Brent, had been selected in 2018 as the 2020 London Borough of Culture. As the most famous current writer from Brent, Smith was the natural choice to author the piece. She chose to adapt "The Wife of Bath's Tale" in Geoffrey Chaucer's Canterbury Tales, recalling how she had translated Chaucer into contemporary English during her studies at Cambridge. The retelling replaces the pilgrimage with a pub crawl set in contemporary London, with the Wife of Bath becoming Alvita, a Jamaican-born British woman in her mid-50s who challenges her Auntie P's traditional Christian views on sex and marriage. Like the original tale, Alvita is a woman who has had five husbands, her experiences with them ranging from pleasant to traumatic. The majority of the piece is spent on her talking to the people in the pub, in much the way that the Wife of Bath's prologue is longer than the tale itself. To her, Alvita's voice is a common one that she heard growing up in Brent, and thus writing this play was a natural choice for the festival. The tale itself is set in early 18th-century Jamaica, where a man guilty of rape is brought before Queen Nanny of the Maroons, who decrees that his punishment is to go and find what women truly desire.

In 2023, Smith stated that she had been writing a historical novel since 2020, focusing on Arthur Orton, who was at the centre of the Tichborne case, a famous 19th-century court case involving identity theft, but spans the period from 1830s to the 1870s (significant for the Reform Act of 1832 and the abolition of slavery). She said that she tried to avoid Charles Dickens as an influence and subject, but that her research process showed her that there was "really no way to entirely avoid Mr. Charles Dickens" since several of the places and events of her story had a relation to him. The book also includes another real-life novelist of the time, William Ainsworth. Smith's historical novel, The Fraud, was published in September 2023.

Reviewing The Fraud for The Independent, Martin Chilton said: "The novel pulls off the trick of being both splendidly modern and authentically old. ... The Fraud is the genuine article." According to Karan Mahajan, writing in The New York Times: "It offers a vast, acute panoply of London and the English countryside, and successfully locates the social controversies of an era in a handful of characters. ... Dickens may be dead, but Smith, thankfully, is alive." In a much longer review, putting The Fraud in context of Smith's other writings, Colin Burrow in The London Review of Books, highlights its "spiky delights". Burrow shows how "Smith gives a fresh angle to this often-told tale [Tichborne case] by concentrating on a key witness in the trials: Andrew Bogle, a Black man who grew up enslaved in Jamaica. There he became the page of Edward Tichborne...who was the manager of the Duke of Buckingham and Chandos's plantations around Kingston....Bogle himself remains the central enigma of the novel....Blowing a hole in earlier literature while feeling its weight is perhaps the main aim of The Fraud. Its restless movement between the 1830s and 1870s deliberately recalls the temporal span of Middlemarch" by George Eliot.

In 2023, Smith was elected to the American Academy of Arts & Sciences.

In October 2025, Smith's collection of essays Dead and Alive was published by Hamish Hamilton.

== Other activities ==
Photographed by Jack Davison and choreographed by Lenio Kaklea, Smith was featured in Bottega Veneta's 2025 advertising campaign celebrating the 50th anniversary of its signature Intrecciato leather.

Smith is featured on Devonté Hynes's fifth studio Album Essex Honey for the track "Vivid Light". She performed the track live with Blood Orange and Mustafa the Poet for BBC Music at Maida Vale Studios in December 2025.

== Personal life ==
Smith met Nick Laird at the University of Cambridge. They married in 2004 in King's College Chapel, Cambridge. Smith dedicated On Beauty to "my dear Laird". She also uses his name in passing in White Teeth: "An' all the good-lookin' men, all the rides like your man Nicky Laird, they're all dead."

The couple lived in Rome from November 2006 to 2007, and later lived in New York City and the Kilburn area of London. They have two children.

Smith describes herself as "unreligious", and was not raised in a religion, although she retains a "curiosity" about the role religion plays in others' lives. In an essay exploring humanist and existentialist views of death and dying, Smith characterises her worldview as that of a "sentimental humanist".

Zadie Smith's favourite book is Middlemarch by George Eliot. In a 2010 interview, she said that Middlemarch was "just an extraordinary achievement in a novel. It's so diverse and gigantic—its concentration is so diffuse. It's a social novel, which England has always aspired to; at the same time, it's a great philosophical novel, like its continental cousins."

In May 2025, Smith signed an open letter calling for an immediate ceasefire in Gaza. The letter described Israel's actions in Gaza as "genocidal".

== Bibliography ==
=== Novels ===
- White Teeth (2000)
- The Autograph Man (2002)
- On Beauty (2005)
- NW (2012)
- Swing Time (2016)
- The Fraud (2023)

=== Plays ===
- The Wife of Willesden (2021)

=== Short fiction ===
Collections

- Martha and Hanwell (2005)
- Grand Union: Stories (2019)

Stories (Note: Short stories unless otherwise noted.)

Title	Year	First published	Reprinted/collected	Notes
"The Waiter's Wife"	1999	"The Waiter's Wife". Granta. 67. December 1999.		
"The Girl with Bangs"	2001	McSweeney's, issue 6. 20 March 2001.		They Might Be Giants' song "Bangs", included on the CD in this issue (also on their album Mink Car) corresponds to this story.
"Martha, Martha"	2003		Martha and Hanwell	
"Envy"	2004	Programme book for the Opera North Spring Season 2004 "Eight Little Greats".		Published as one of seven short contributions on the theme of "Seven Sins"
"Hanwell in Hell"	2004		Martha and Hanwell	
"Hanwell Senior"	2007	The New Yorker, 14 May 2007		
"Permission to Enter"	2012	"Permission to Enter". The New Yorker. 23 July 2012.		
The Embassy of Cambodia	2013	"The Embassy of Cambodia". The New Yorker. Vol. 89, no. 1. 11–18 February 2013. pp. 88–98.		
"Meet the President!"	2013	The New Yorker, 5 August 2013	Grand Union: Stories	
"Moonlit Landscape with Bridge"	2014	"Moonlit Landscape with Bridge". The New Yorker. Vol. 89, no. 48. 10 February 2014. pp. 64–71.		
"Big Week"	2014	"Big Week". The Paris Review. Vol. Summer 2014, no. 209. 2014.		
"Escape from New York"	2015	The New Yorker, 1 June 2015	Grand Union: Stories	
"Two Men Arrive in a Village"	2016	"Two Men Arrive in a Village". The New Yorker. 6–13 June 2016.	Grand Union: Stories	
"Crazy They Call Me"	2017	"Crazy they Call Me". The New Yorker. 26 February 2017.		
"The Lazy River"	2017	The New Yorker, 11 December 2017	Grand Union: Stories	
"Now More Than Ever"	2018	"Now More Than Ever". The New Yorker. 23 July 2018.	Grand Union: Stories	
"Weirdo"	2021			Written with Nick Laird, illustrated by Magenta Fox

=== Non-fiction ===
- Changing My Mind: Occasional Essays (2009)
- Stop What You're Doing and Read This! (2011) (with Carmen Callil, Mark Haddon, Michael Rosen and Jeanette Winterson)
- * "Mind the Gap" in Guernica, January 2012.
- "Some Notes on Attunement: A voyage around Joni Mitchell", The New Yorker, 17 December 2012, and later featured in The Best American Essays (2013)
- "Take it or leave it". Take Out. The New Yorker. Vol. 89, no. 35. 4 November 2013. p. 86.
- "On optimism and despair", The New York Review of Books, 22 December 2016; speech given on accepting the Welt-Literaturpreis
- Fences: A Brexit Diary (2016)
- "A bird of few words : narrative mysteries in the paintings of Lynette Yiadom-Boakye". Onward and Upward with the Arts. The New Yorker. Vol. 93, no. 17. 19 June 2017. pp. 48–53. (Note: Online version is titled "Lynette Yiadom-Boakye's imaginary portraits".)
- Feel Free: Essays (2018)
- "Darryl Pinckney's Intimate Study of Black History". The New Yorker. 26 November 2019. From Introduction to Darryl Pinckney, Busted in New York and Other Essays (Farrar, Straus and Giroux, 2019)
- Intimations (2020)
- "Take it or leave it". First Tastes. 4 November 2013. The New Yorker. Vol. 97, no. 27. 6 September 2021. p. 65. (Note: Originally published in the 4 November 2013 issue.)
- "Shibboleth - the role of words in the campus protests", The New Yorker, 5 May 2024.
- "'Here comes the sun': Zadie Smith on hope, trepidation and rebirth after 14 years of the Tories", The Guardian, 3 July 2024.
- Dead and Alive. Penguin Group. 28 October 2025. ISBN 978-0-593-83468-8.

=== Children's books ===
- Smith, Zadie; Laird, Nick (2021). Weirdo. Puffin. ISBN 978-0241449608.
- Smith, Zadie; Laird, Nick (2022). The Surprise. Penguin Young Readers Group. ISBN 9780593525975.

=== As editor ===
- Piece of Flesh (2001)
- The Burned Children of America (2003) (with Dave Eggers)
- The Book of Other People (2007)

=== Critical studies and reviews of Smith's work ===
- Walters, Tracey (ed.). Decoded: New Essays on Zadie Smith. New York: Peter Lang, 2021.
- Tew, Philip (ed.). Reading Zadie Smith: The First Decade and Beyond. London: Bloomsbury, 2013.
- Tew, Philip. Zadie Smith. London and New York: Palgrave Macmillan, 2010.
- Walters, Tracey (ed.). Zadie Smith: Critical Essays. New York: Peter Lang Publications, 2008.

Reviews of Feel Free

- Clark, Alex (3 February 2018). "Feel Free by Zadie Smith review – wonderfully suggestive essays". The Guardian.
- Hoby, Hermione (21 February 2018). "Zadie Smith's book of essays explores what it means to be human : the varieties of individuality in 'Feel Free'". The New Republic.

Reviews of NW

- Smallwood, Christine (November 2012). "Mental weather : the many voices of Zadie Smith". Reviews. Harper's Magazine. Vol. 325, no. 1950. pp. 86–90.
- Bentley, Nick (2018). "Trailing Postmodernism : David Mitchell's Cloud Atlas, Zadie Smith's NW, and the Metamodern". English Studies. 99 (7): 723–43. doi:10.1080/0013838X.2018.1510611. S2CID 165906081.

== Awards and recognition ==
Smith was elected a Fellow of the Royal Society of Literature (FRSL) in 2002. In a 2004 BBC poll of cultural researchers, she was named among the top twenty most influential people in British culture.

In 2003, she was included on Granta magazine's list of 20 best young authors, and was also included in the 2013 list. She joined New York University's Creative Writing Program as a tenured professor on 1 September 2010. Smith has won the Orange Prize for Fiction and the Anisfield-Wolf Book Award in 2006 and her novel White Teeth was included in Time magazine's list of the 100 best English-language novels from 1923 to 2005.

- White Teeth: won the Whitbread First Novel Award, the Guardian First Book Award, the James Tait Black Memorial Prize, and the Commonwealth Writers’ First Book Award. Included on Time magazine's 100 best English-language novels published from 1923 to 2005
- The Autograph Man: won the Jewish Quarterly Wingate Literary Prize
- On Beauty: won the Commonwealth Writers’ Best Book Award (Eurasia Section), and the Orange Prize for Fiction; shortlisted for the Man Booker Prize
- NW: shortlisted for the Royal Society of Literature Ondaatje Prize and the Women's Prize for Fiction
- Swing Time: longlisted for the Man Booker Prize 2017
- Granta′s Best of Young British Novelists, 2003 and 2013
- 2016: Welt-Literaturpreis
- 2017: Langston Hughes Medal awarded on 16 November at the Langston Hughes Festival at The City College of New York.
- 2019: Infinity Award, Critical Writing and Research, International Center of Photography
- 2018: National Book Critics Circle Award for Criticism for Feel Free
- 2020: Grand Union named a finalist for The Story Prize
- 2022: Grammy Award for Album of the Year win as a featured artist on We Are by Jon Batiste
- 2022: received the Bodley Medal, the Bodleian Libraries' highest honour, "awarded to individuals who have made outstanding contributions to the worlds of books and literature, libraries, media and communications, science and philanthropy", presented by Richard Ovenden.
- 2022: PEN/Audible Literary Service Award in recognition of Smith's "remarkable achievements as a novelist, short story writer, and essayist whose work displays unparalleled attention to craft and humane ideals"
- 2022: Critics' Circle Theatre Award for "Most Promising Playwright" (The Wife of Willesden)
- 2023: The Fraud was awarded the inaugural Westport Prize for Literature, established by The Westport Library to honour "an original work of fiction that explores issues in contemporary society"
- 2024: Finalist for Pulitzer Prize for Criticism for "a review of the film 'Tár'".

== Interviews ==
- Elmhirst, Sophie, "Zadie Smith: Adventures in Paris, London and New York with the peerless British novelist", The Gentlewoman, Issue n° 14, Autumn & Winter 2016.
- Merritt, Stephanie, "She's young, black, British – and the first publishing sensation of the millennium", The Observer, 16 January 2000.
- Press, Joy, "Only Connect"., an interview with Zadie Smith in the Village Voice, 13 September 2005.
- Stewart, Alison. Interview with Zadie Smith about her work Grand Union. Interview and discussion broadcast on WNYC Public Radio show All Of It with Alison Stewart on 16 October 2020 (recorded in 2019).
- Tanguay, Brian, "A Conversation with Zadie Smith", Santa Barbara Independent, 21 November 2017.
