= Swing Time (novel) =

2016 novel by Zadie Smith

- Author: Zadie Smith
- Language: English
- Genre: Novel
- Publisher: Hamish Hamilton
- Publication date: 2016
- Publication place: United Kingdom
- Pages: 453
- ISBN: 978-1594203985

Swing Time is a novel by British writer Zadie Smith, published in November 2016. The story takes place in London, New York and West Africa, focusing on the relationship between an unnamed narrator and her best friend, Tracey.

The narrative opens in 1982, when the narrator meets Tracey in a dance class in North London. The two form a close friendship and are both mixed-race girls growing up in similar circumstances, though they are contrasted in temperament and ability. An early point of difference is Tracey's innate talent at dance, compared to the narrator's emotional, academic, and aesthetic interests. The novel follows both women from childhood into adulthood, moving between past and present to explore themes of freedom, determinism, and class mobility.

Swing Time was longlisted for the Man Booker Prize in 2017. It was also a finalist for the National Book Critics Circle Award for Fiction in 2016 and appeared on the New York Times' 100 Notable Books of 2016 list.

== Plot ==
Beginning in 2008, the novel tells the story of two mixed-race, black and white, girls who meet in 1982 in a tap class in London. The unnamed narrator, who has a white, working-class father, and a mother of Jamaican descent is immediately drawn to the precocious Tracey, who has a white mother and a black father in prison, as they have the same skin colour and are the only black children at their dance lessons. Despite the fact that the narrator's semi-intellectual mother looks down on Tracey, the two become best friends as they live in neighbouring estate flats. While the narrator's dance career is hampered by her flat feet, Tracey is something of a prodigy and goes on to win many awards. Tracey credits this in part to the fact that her father is one of Michael Jackson's backup dancers, a lie she makes up to explain his prolonged absences.

When the girls are ten, a twenty-two year old Australian pop-star named Aimee becomes a world-wide sensation. At the birthday party of one of their friends the girls perform a sexualized dance, inspired by Aimee's dancing which is caught on tape by one of the girls and which is cut short when the mother of the birthday girl walks in on Tracey and the narrator on top of each other.

In 1998 the narrator, newly graduated from college, is working at YTV, a music channel, and has a brief encounter with Aimee who comes to the station. When Aimee's assistant quits a month later, she hires the narrator to come work for her.

When the narrator is in her 30s, Aimee decides to build an all girls school in a rural village in an unspecified country in West Africa (implied to be Gambia). The narrator is part of Aimee's advance team along with Lamin, a young Senegalese man. Aimee builds the school but the narrator finds the work they do there questionable and often useless.

Reflecting back on her school years she recalls that, while she was identified by teachers as an advanced reader, she purposely failed her entrance exams for a grammar school. Meanwhile, Tracey attended a performing arts high school and the two mostly lost touch. Occasionally seeing each other around the neighbourhood the narrator runs into Tracey a handful of times during her teenage years, once when Tracey is having a drug overdose and another time when they are recruited by their old dance instructor to handle the tickets at the children's concert. Tracey steals the money from the concert and, when she is accused of doing so, she and her mother accuse the old piano player who accompanied the dancers as children of molesting Tracey. The narrator realizes that Tracey probably was sexually assaulted as a child by her own father.

The narrator attends college and graduates jobless. Eventually she reunites with Tracey, who has a small part in a revival of Guys and Dolls and helps the narrator secure a position as a stagehand. After four months the narrator manages to get the internship at YTV. She tells this to Tracey along with the fact that she is quitting the show. In retaliation Tracey sends her a confessional letter telling the narrator that she saw her father having sex with a black blowup doll he had dressed like a golliwog. The narrator cuts off contact with Tracey, only seeing her again roughly eight years later during a performance of Show Boat. The narrator means to say hello to Tracey after the show but she instead sees Tracey's mother coming to pick her up with two small children, assumed to be Tracey's, in the backseat.

In the present the narrator continues to visit the school Aimee built and hears rumours that Aimee is in love with Lamin and wants to bring him to the U.S. The rumours turn out to be true. The narrator is assigned degrading tasks which she thinks are punishment for her disapproval of Lamin and Aimee's relationship but turn out to be because the narrator's mother, now a Member of Parliament is openly criticizing the government of the country where Aimee's school is located.

Visiting her mother, the narrator learns that Tracey has been in contact with her once again, at first because of a local issue involving her son being expelled and then contacting her three or more times a day to send abusive emails that are full of conspiracy theories. The narrator goes to Tracey's childhood flat, where she is still living, to find Tracey who is now overweight and has three children by three different men.

Returning to West Africa for a final time with Aimee, the narrator witnesses an event where she and Aimee are introduced to a beautiful three-day-old baby. She also begins a brief sexual affair with Lamin, who is not in love with the narrator but is unhappy with his relationship with Aimee as Aimee is much older than him. Fern, one of the men who has been hired to work on the school and who is in love with the narrator, discovers the relationship between the narrator and Lamin and grows jealous.

Back in London, the narrator discovers to her shock that Aimee has adopted Sankofa, the baby they met in West Africa, by somewhat illegal means. Shortly after the narrator is fired as Fern revealed to Aimee that the narrator slept with Lamin. Angry after being thrown out of her home and realizing that her entire life was attached to Aimee, the narrator sends the news of the illegal adoption to gossip rags. Aimee and her team try to counter this by creating a blind item revealing the narrator's name, but the public is on the narrator's side. Aimee has her sent to London. Despite not loving Lamin, the narrator pays for him to meet her there.

Once in London, the video tape of the narrator dancing provocatively with Tracey is released online by Tracey and Aimee manages to smooth over the adoption scandal by having the parents of her adopted child come forward and say they are happy.

The narrator decides to move back in with her mother but discovers that she is in hospice care. She also discovers that Tracey has been continuing to send harassing emails to her mother throughout her illness. Nevertheless, the last time the narrator and her mother meet, the narrator's mother begs her to adopt Tracey's children so that they will be taken care of properly. The narrator decides that rather than adopt or ignore them she will seek out a middle ground.

The book ends on the day her mother dies when, instead of going to see her mother at the hospice, she goes to Tracey's flat and sees her and her children dancing together.

== Allusions to other works ==
The novel references numerous Hollywood musicals, as the unnamed narrator is obsessed with them as a child. It takes its title from the 1936 George Stevens movie Swing Time, starring Fred Astaire and Ginger Rogers, specifically referencing the "Bojangles of Harlem sequence" in which Astaire sports blackface. Jeni Le Gon becomes an icon for the narrator and Tracey after they see her dancing in Ali Baba Goes to Town.

In a scene in the novel, the narrator and Aimee go to Kenwood House where the narrator mentions, without naming her, Dido Elizabeth Belle and the portrait of her with her cousin Lady Elizabeth Murray.

In another scene, the narrator is taken to see Chris Marker's 1983 documentary film Sans Soleil by her boyfriend Rakim.

The novel references Smith's debut novel White Teeth as the narrator briefly mentions going to school with Irie (Irie Jones) who, like the narrator, has a Jamaican mother.

== Reception ==
Taiye Selasi writing for The Guardian called Swing Time Smith's "finest" novel yet. Ron Charles of The Washington Post dubbed it "a big social novel nimble enough to keep all its diverse parts moving gracefully toward a vision of what really matters in this life when the music stops."

Holly Bass of The New York Times criticized the "unsympathetic" narrator. Sadiya Ansari writing for the Toronto Star had similar criticisms, disliking the narrator's tendency "to just float". The Irish Times critic John Boyne was much harsher, criticizing the novel for "lacking a consistent narrative drive, an interesting voice or a compelling point of view".
