= The Fraud =

2023 novel by Zadie Smith

The Fraud: A Novel
- 2023 Penguin book jacket
- Author: Zadie Smith
- Subject: Fiction - Trials, litigation, William Harrison Ainsworth, Imposters, Housekeepers, London.
- Genre: Novel, historical fiction
- Set in: 19th-century London
- Published: September 2023
- Publisher: Penguin
- Publication place: United Kingdom, United States
- Media type: Print, E-book, Audio
- ISBN: 9780525558965
- Website: Official website

The Fraud is a historical novel based on the Tichborne case written by Zadie Smith and published by Penguin Random House in 2023.

== Synopsis ==
Mrs Touchet is the Scottish housekeeper and a cousin by marriage of William Harrison Ainsworth. In 1873 she has been living with him for thirty years in London, Brighton and Surrey. He used to be a famed novelist. In 1834 his gothic novel Rookwood was a popular serial. Later he got negative reviews, and he had a conflict with Charles Dickens and illustrator George Cruikshank.

All of England is captivated with a trial. Roger Tichborne, rightful heir to a baronetcy and a family fortune, was presumed to have died in a shipwreck in 1854, but now a man claims to be him. Andrew Bogle, who grew up as a slave on a Jamaican sugar plantation, is a star witness.

== Reception ==
According to The New York Times, Smith's "new novel, 'The Fraud,' is based on a celebrated 19th-century criminal trial, but it keeps one eye focused clearly on today's political populism." According to the Los Angeles Times, "Not only is [the novel] set in 19th century England with a sprawling cast of characters high and low, but Charles Dickens himself makes an appearance, charming everyone except those who envy his success. But there's more to this brilliant new entry in Smith's catalog than a simple literary romp."

== Accolades ==
The Fraud by Zadie Smith has garnered accolades. It was selected as a New York Times book of the year 2023, a New Yorker magazine 2023 book of the year and a Washington Post hardcover bestseller in December 2023.
