= Hysterical realism =

Term to describe certain realist-genre books

Hysterical realism, also known as recherché postmodernism, is a literary style typified by a strong contrast between elaborately absurd prose, plotting, or characterization, and careful, detailed investigations of real, specific social phenomena. The term was coined as a pejorative in 2000 by English literary critic James Wood.

== Definition and history ==
Wood introduced the term in an essay on Zadie Smith's White Teeth (2000), which appeared in the July 24, 2000, issue of The New Republic. Wood uses the term pejoratively to denote the contemporary conception of the "big, ambitious novel" that pursues "vitality at all costs" and consequently "knows a thousand things but does not know a single human being." He decried the genre as an attempt to "turn fiction into social theory," and an attempt to tell readers "how the world works rather than how somebody felt about something." Wood pointed to Don DeLillo and Thomas Pynchon as the forefathers of the genre, which was continuing, Wood claimed, in writers like David Foster Wallace.

In response, Smith described hysterical realism as a "painfully accurate term for the sort of overblown, manic prose to be found in novels like my own White Teeth and a few others [Wood] was sweet enough to mention". Smith qualified the term, though, explaining that "any collective term for a supposed literary movement is always too large a net, catching significant dolphins among so much cannable tuna." She also noted:

David Foster Wallace's mammoth beast Infinite Jest was heaved in as an exemplum, but it is five years old, and is a world away from his delicate, entirely 'human' short stories and essays of the past two years, which shy away from the kind of totalizing theoretical and thematic arcs that Wood was gunning for. If anyone has recently learned a lesson about the particularities of human existence and their separation from social systems, it is Wallace.

Wood's line of argument echoed many common criticisms of postmodernist art generally. In particular, Wood's attacks on DeLillo and Pynchon clearly echo similar criticisms other critics had already lodged against them a generation earlier. The "hysterical" prose style is often paired with "realistic"—almost journalistic—effects, such as Pynchon's depiction of 18th-century land surveys in Mason & Dixon (1997), and DeLillo's treatment of Lee Harvey Oswald in Libra (1988).

Yet, as Zadie Smith notes:

People continue to manage this awesome trick of wrestling sentiment away from TV's colonization of all things soulful and human, and I would applaud all the youngish Americans—Franzen, Moody, Foster Wallace, Eggers, Moore for their (supposedly) small but, to me, significant triumphs. They work to keep both sides of the equation—brain and heart—present in their fiction. Even if you find them obtuse, they can rarely be accused of cliché...

== Works ==
Some books described as examples of hysterical realism are:

- Pynchon, Thomas (1973). Gravity's Rainbow.
- Rushdie, Salman (1981). Midnight's Children.
- Wallace, David Foster (1996). Infinite Jest.
- DeLillo, Don (1997). Underworld.
- Pynchon, Thomas (1997). Mason & Dixon.
- Rushdie, Salman (1999). The Ground Beneath Her Feet.
- Smith, Zadie (2000). White Teeth.
- Eggers, Dave (2000). A Heartbreaking Work of Staggering Genius.
- Fuguet, Alberto (2000). The Movies of My Life.
- Franzen, Jonathan (2001). The Corrections.
- Eugenides, Jeffrey (2002). Middlesex.
- Kleeman, Alexandra (2015). You Too Can Have a Body Like Mine.
- Hobson, Brandon (2025). The Devil is a Southpaw.

== See also ==
- American realism
- Genre studies
- Literary realism
- Literary theory
- Magic realism
- Maximalism
- Realism (arts)
- Postmodernism
