= David Yates =

English filmmaker (born 1963)

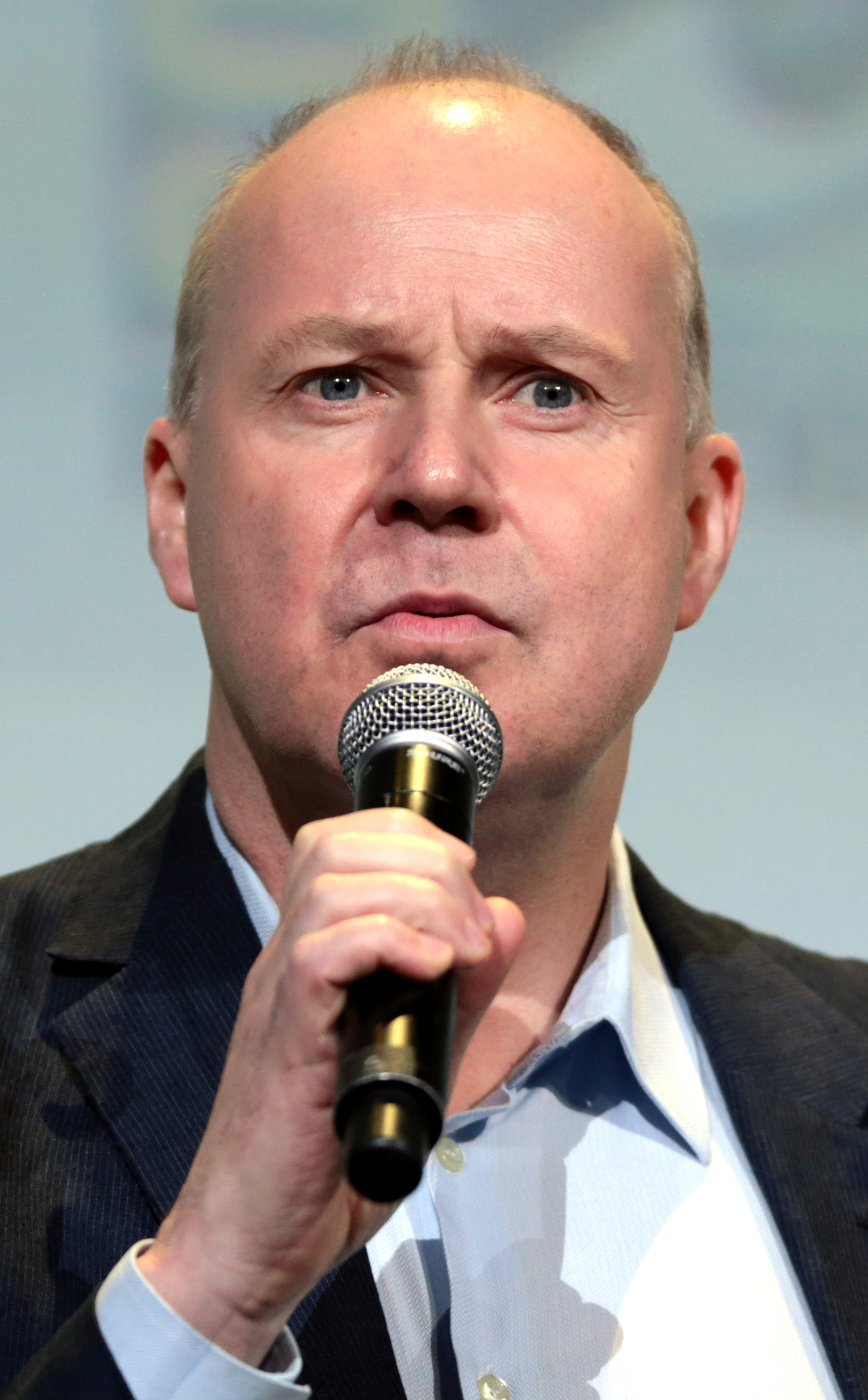
- Yates at the 2016 San Diego Comic-Con
- Born: 8 October 1963 (age 63); St Helens, England
- Education: University of Essex (BA); National Film and Television School
- Occupations: Film director; producer; screenwriter
- Years active: 1988–present
- Spouse: Yvonne Walcott
- Relatives: Theo Walcott (nephew)

David Yates (born 8 October 1963) is an English filmmaker, who has directed feature films, short films, and television productions. He is best known for directing the final four films in the Harry Potter series and the three films of its prequel series, Fantastic Beasts. His work on the Harry Potter series brought him critical and commercial success along with accolades, such as the British Academy Britannia Award for Excellence in Directing.

Yates directed various short films and became a television director early in his career. His credits include the six-part political thriller State of Play (2003), for which he won the Directors Guild of Great Britain Award for Outstanding Directorial Achievement, the adult two-part documentary drama Sex Traffic (2004) and the Emmy Award-winning television film The Girl in the Café (2005).

Yates is a founding member of Directors UK, and has had a close partnership with Warner Bros. as a director and producer. Around 2022 he started work out of his own production company, Wychwood Media.

== Early life ==
David was born on 8 October 1963 in St Helens, England. He was raised in the village of Rainhill. His parents died when he was young. Yates was inspired to pursue a career in filmmaking after watching Steven Spielberg's 1975 movie Jaws. Yates's mother bought him a Super 8mm camera. He used this to shoot various films in which his friends and family featured. One such film, The Ghost Ship, was shot on board the vessel where his uncle worked as a cook. He attended Grange Park High School, St Helens College and then the University of Essex. Yates said that he "used to skive off college all the time" and never expected to attend university before being surprised by his A-Level exam results. While at the University of Essex, Yates formed the Film and Video Production Society. He graduated with a BA in Government in 1987.

== Career ==
=== Television and film career (1988–2005) ===
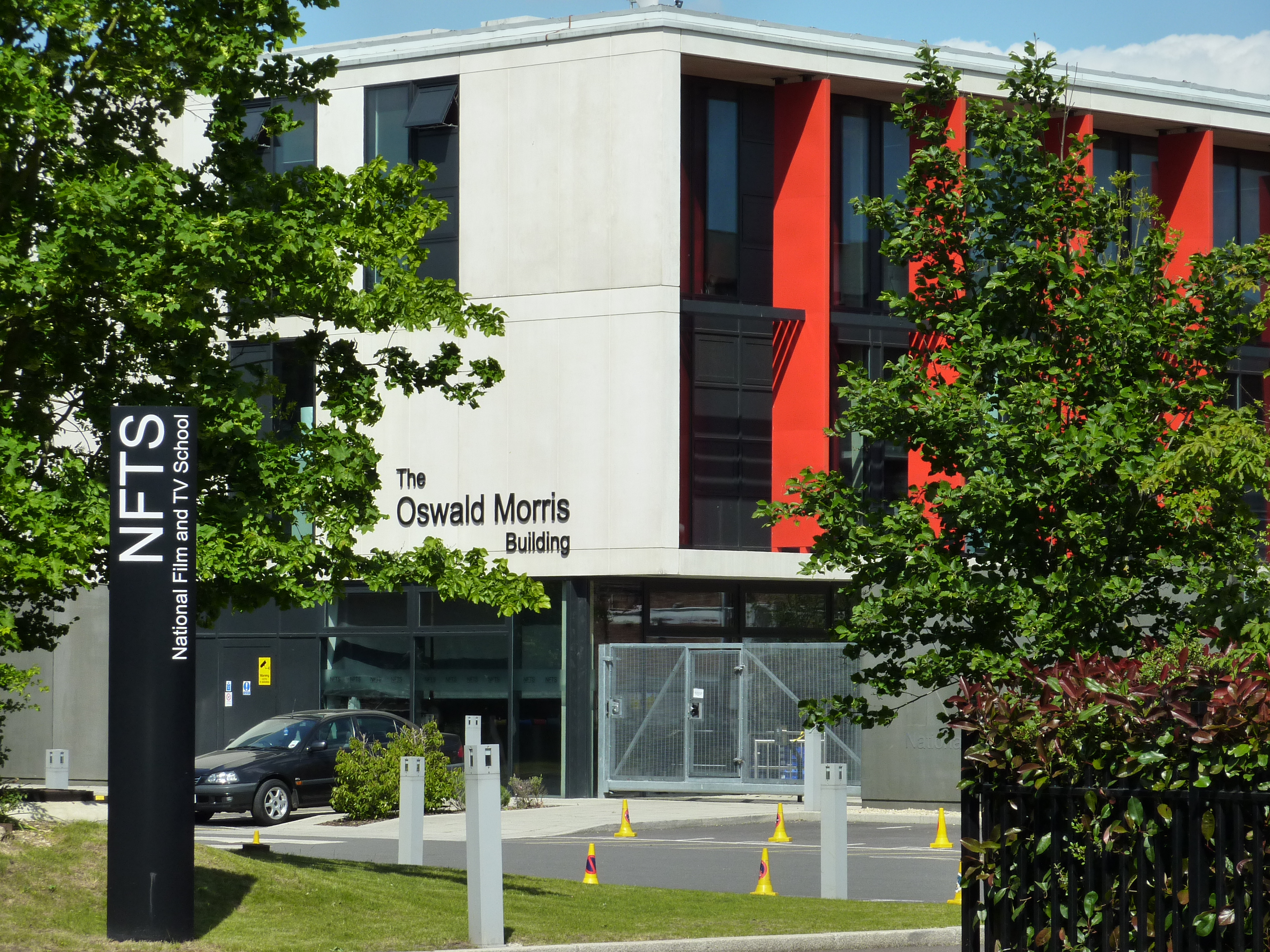
The National Film and Television School, where Yates trained as a director

In 1988, Yates made his first film When I Was a Girl in Swindon. The film entered the festival circuit where it was named Best Short Film at the San Francisco International Film Festival. It contributed towards Yates's acceptance into the National Film and Television School in 1989 and led to the BBC hiring him to direct Oranges and Lemons, a short drama film in 1991. Before completing film school, he began to direct, produce and write the screenplay to the dramatic short The Weaver's Wife. He also made his fourth short film, Good Looks, which was presented at the Chicago International Film Festival. After graduating in 1992, Yates directed an episode of the film studies programme Moving Pictures.

From 1994 to 1995, Yates directed several episodes of the ITV police procedural The Bill before directing and producing three episodes of the television documentary Tale of Three Seaside Towns alongside producer Alistair Clarke. The programme followed media personalities Russell Grant, Honor Blackman and Pam Ayres visiting and exploring the South Coast towns of Brighton, Eastbourne and Weymouth. Yates directed his fifth short film Punch before making his feature film debut in 1998 with the release of the independent historical-drama film The Tichborne Claimant. The film, which was shown at the Edinburgh International Film Festival, was written by Joe Fisher and based on the true events of the Tichborne Case. It starred Stephen Fry and Robert Hardy and was shot on location in Merseyside and on the Isle of Man.

Yates returned to television in 2000 to direct the episodes of Greed, Envy and Lust for the BBC miniseries The Sins, starring Pete Postlethwaite, as well as The Way We Live Now, the four-part television adaptation of the novel of the same name by Anthony Trollope. Yates shared the British Academy Television Award for Best Drama Serial with screenwriter Andrew Davies and producer Nigel Stafford-Clark at the 2002 BAFTA Awards.

One year later, Yates attended the 56th BAFTA Awards with a British Academy Film Award nomination for Best Short Film for the fourteen-minute production, Rank, which expressed the social elements of racism, friendship and adolescence through the story of a street gang that cross Glasgow to witness the arrival of a group of Somali refugees. Yates said that even though The Way We Live Now was "a very big production" and "enormous fun to do", Rank was an opportunity to "shake all that off" and "get back to [his] roots". Of the casting, Yates said that he "wanted to use non-actors to tell the story, to create a reality ... the kids we cast in Glasgow had never done a film before." The film was noted for its gritty style and cinematography, with a review from Eye For Film stating that "such intelligent use of camera and cast lifts Yates out of the pool of promising young directors into the front line of genuine hopefuls. This work demands respect."

The 2003 six-part thriller State of Play was Yates's next achievement. Yates collected the TV Spielfilm Award at the Cologne Conference in Germany and won the Directors Guild of Great Britain Award for Outstanding Directorial Achievement. The serial was recognised by various award ceremonies, receiving the Peabody Award for Broadcasting Excellence and being presented with two British Academy Television Craft Awards. The quality of the serial sparked Hollywood film bosses to consider adapting it into a film, with producer Andrew Hauptman declaring that "it's a blistering political thriller and we want to make an equally blistering movie." State of Play is regarded by critics from The Guardian and The Times as one of the best British television dramas of the 2000s.

Yates directed the television adaptation of nine-year-old Daisy Ashford's novel The Young Visiters, starring Jim Broadbent alongside Hugh Laurie. According to a review by Variety magazine for BBC America, Yates and his team yielded "a warm and surprisingly unsentimental production that has 'evergreen' written all over it".

In 2004, Yates's two-part drama Sex Traffic was broadcast on Channel 4. It won eight BAFTA Awards including Best Editing for Mark Day, who regularly worked with Yates on many of his television projects and short films. Day commented on his collaboration with Yates saying that "we are very good friends because we have spent so much time together". He also said, "David shoots in a similar style from piece to piece, although this wasn’t quite as frantic as State of Play." Yates was nominated for another Directors Guild of Great Britain Award for his direction of Sex Traffic and won his second BAFTA for Best Drama Serial at the British Academy Television Awards. Being a British-Canadian production, Sex Traffic gained four wins at Canada's annual television award ceremony, the Gemini Awards, including Best Dramatic Miniseries. Spanning across two parts, the three-hour-long drama reveals how the trafficking of young women into slavery is a big business which operates throughout Europe; both parts were acclaimed for their "shocking" portrayal of such a sensitive topic.

Also in 2004, Yates was involved in plans for a film adaptation of Evelyn Waugh's novel Brideshead Revisited for Warner Independent Pictures. He was set to work with Paul Bettany, Jude Law and Jennifer Connelly on the project, but pulled out in the later stages due to constant budget issues affecting the film's production.

Yates then directed Richard Curtis' script to The Girl in the Café, a television film starring Bill Nighy and Kelly Macdonald. In June 2005, the film was aired on the BBC in Britain and was also broadcast in the United States on Home Box Office. The Girl in the Café achieved three wins at the Emmy Awards, including the Primetime Emmy Award for Outstanding Made for Television Movie, and gained a total of four nominations including Outstanding Directing for Yates.

=== Harry Potter (2006–2011) ===
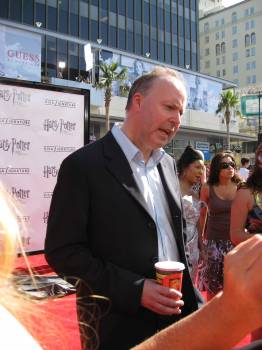
Yates outside Grauman's Chinese Theatre at the premiere of Harry Potter and the Order of the Phoenix on 8 July 2007

During the period of working on plans for Brideshead Revisited, Yates was told by his agent that he had made the director shortlist for the fifth film in the Harry Potter series and that Warner Bros. was eyeing him to direct. Shortly after, he was confirmed to direct Harry Potter and the Order of the Phoenix by Warner Bros. Pictures, with production scheduled to begin in early 2006. When asked how Yates got the job, producer David Heyman ("a big fan" of Yates's television work) said that "actors in David's television projects give their best performance, often of their career. It's important to keep pushing the actors, particularly the young ones on each Potter film. This is a political film, not with a capital P, but it's about teen rebellion and the abuse of power. David has made films in the U.K. about politics without being heavy handed."

Before production began, Yates invited Harry Potter and the Goblet of Fire director Mike Newell to a pub and "picked his brains about what it was going to be like to step into someone's shoes on a movie of this scale". The first scene that Yates shot featured a giant interacting with human characters. The scene was the very first high-scale visual effects piece Yates filmed in his career. After the film's post-production material was well received by the studio, Yates was chosen to direct the sixth film, Harry Potter and the Half-Blood Prince, which according to Yates was going to be "a cross between the chills of Prisoner of Azkaban [the third film in the series] and the fantastical adventure of Goblet of Fire".

In 2007, Order of the Phoenix opened to positive reviews and commercial success. Yates won the title of Best Director at the Empire Awards and collected the People's Choice Award from the European Film Academy. However, the film was criticised by fans of the series for having the shortest running time out of the five released instalments; Yates said that the original director's cut was "probably over three hours", resulting in much footage being cut, condensed and edited to fit within the studio's preferred time frame.

During production of Half-Blood Prince, Warner Bros. executive Alan F. Horn announced that the seventh and final novel in the series, Harry Potter and the Deathly Hallows, was to be split into two cinematic parts with Yates, once again, as the director. Yates spoke of the decision to appoint him as the director of the final films, remarking that "they wanted to do a Harry Potter that felt ... more grown up. What's smart about the studio and the producers is they have always wanted to push it a bit. Chris Columbus did a wonderful job of casting and making this world incredibly popular. But rather than do more of the same, they said, 'Let's bring in Alfonso Cuarón and let him run with it. Then later, let's bring in David Yates, who's done all this hard-hitting stuff on TV.' It's a testament to their ambition to try to keep the franchise fresh. The bizarre thing is, I did one [film] and they asked me to stay for three more, so obviously they liked something."

Half-Blood Prince was released in 2009 and became the only film in the series to earn an Academy Award nomination for Best Cinematography. Yates worked alongside French cinematographer Bruno Delbonnel on, what Yates called, extensively colour grading the "incredibly rich" picture by making it look "very European" and drawing influences from the Dutch painter Rembrandt. The film garnered a mix of accolades and was acclaimed for its stylised character-driven approach, but some fans complained about the script's deviation from the novel and the film's slight romantic comedy nature. In response to this criticism, BAFTA member and film critic Mark Kermode praised Yates's direction and ranked the film "second best" in the series, behind Prisoner of Azkaban.

Yates began to film Deathly Hallows – Part 1 and Deathly Hallows – Part 2 back-to-back in early 2009 and finished reshoots in late 2010. He stated that he had shot the two parts of the final adaptation differently, with Part 1 being a "road movie" and "quite real", "almost like a vérité documentary", while Part 2 is "more operatic, colourful and fantasy-oriented", a "big opera with huge battles." Yates reshot the final scene of the Harry Potter series at Leavesden Studios after the original version, filmed at London King's Cross railway station, did not meet his expectations. In the film, the scene takes place at the magical Platform 9¾.

Part 1 was released worldwide in November 2010 to commercial success along with generally positive reviews, some of which reflected on Yates's directing style. The Dallas Morning News affirmed that "David Yates' fluid, fast-paced direction sends up the crackling tension of a thriller" and The New York Times analysed Yates's approach to J. K. Rowling's character development by saying that he has "demonstrated a thorough, uncondescending sympathy for her characters, in particular the central trio of Ron Weasley, Hermione Granger and Harry Potter himself." The film was praised for its "dark" atmosphere and its loyalty to the source material, but it was criticised for its slow middle act, the handling of exposition, and the somewhat disjointed pacing.

Part 2 was screened in July 2011 and became an instant record-breaking success with critical acclaim. The Daily Telegraph described Part 2 as "monumental cinema awash with gorgeous tones" and Total Film wrote that Yates combines "spectacle and emotion into a thrilling final chapter." Author J. K. Rowling remarked that "everyone who watches Deathly Hallows – Part 2 is going to see that he's steered us home magnificently. It's incredible." Part 2 is one of two Harry Potter films to pass the $1 billion mark during its original theatrical run; it became the highest-grossing film in the series and the highest-grossing film of 2011, making Yates the director of the highest-grossing non-James Cameron film of all time in August 2011. Amongst other accolades, Yates won his second Empire Award for Best Director and joined the principal creative team of Harry Potter in receiving the 2012 ADG Award for Outstanding Contribution to Cinematic Imagery for their work on Deathly Hallows – Part 2 and the series in general.

Yates attended the 64th British Academy Film Awards in February 2011, where he was joined by J. K. Rowling, David Heyman, Mike Newell, Alfonso Cuarón, David Barron, Rupert Grint, and Emma Watson in collecting the Michael Balcon Award for Outstanding British Contribution to Cinema on behalf of the Harry Potter films. Daniel Radcliffe, who portrayed the films' titular character, commented on working with Yates, saying that he "added his own sense of grit and realism [to the series] that perhaps wasn't there so much before. I think we all had a fantastic time working with David. I know we did."

=== Tyrant and Tarzan (2012–2016) ===
By 2012, Yates was working on a few Warner Bros. projects, including a Tarzan feature film and an Al Capone biopic called Cicero. He also controversially said that he was working with BBC Worldwide on plans to develop a Doctor Who film, although this was denied by the showrunner, Steven Moffat, in July 2012. Because of production delays, Yates began to explore other projects including television work.

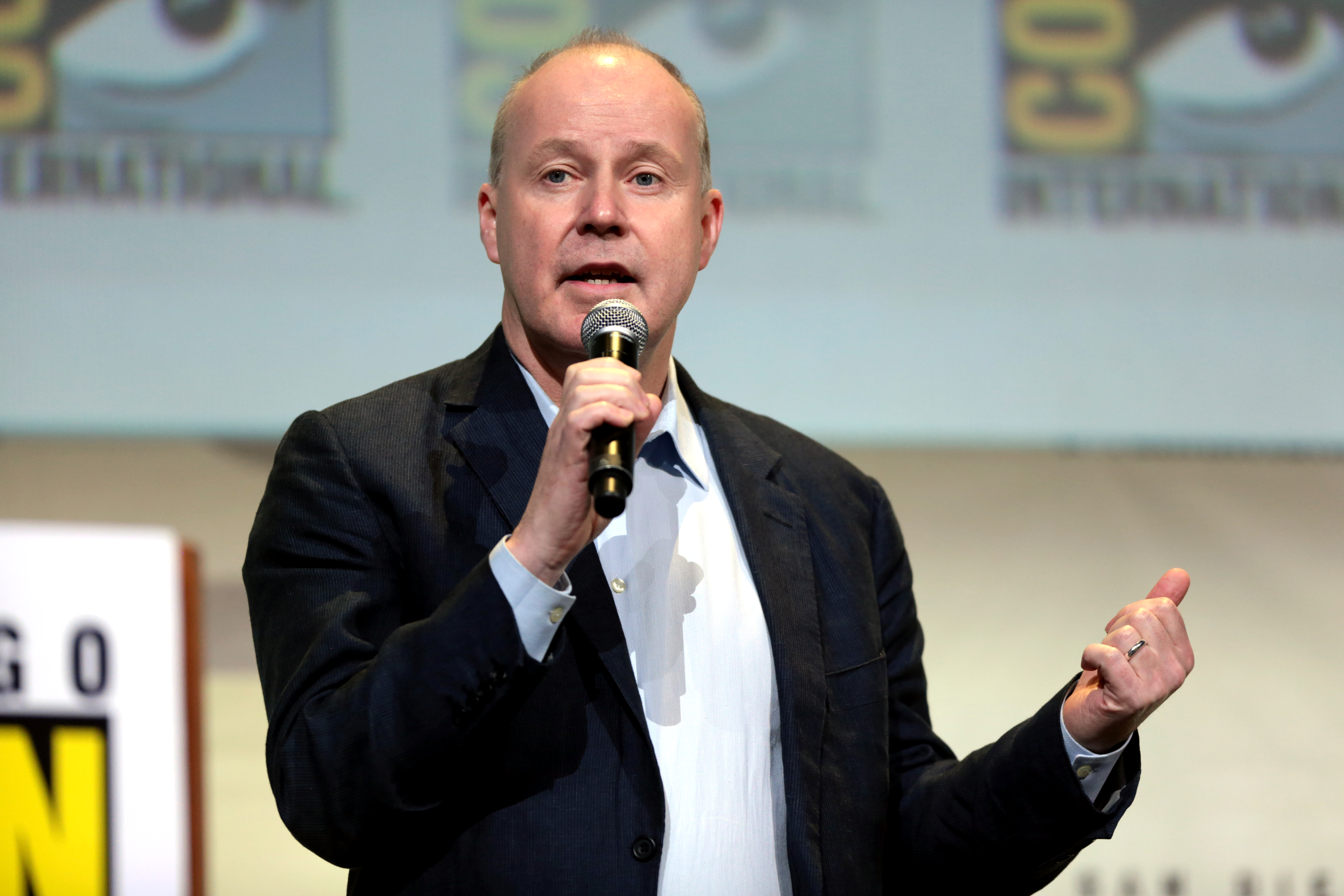
Yates speaking at San Diego Comic-Con, 2016

In 2013, he returned to television by signing on to direct the television pilot of Tyrant, an American drama set in a fictional Middle East conflict and created by Israeli filmmaker Gideon Raff, who conceived the series while watching a television news report at his apartment in Tel Aviv. The pilot was filmed in Morocco before production moved to Israel and then to Turkey for the subsequent series. The following year, Yates began shooting The Legend of Tarzan, starring Alexander Skarsgård, Samuel L. Jackson, Margot Robbie, Djimon Hounsou, Jim Broadbent, and Christoph Waltz. The film, released in 2016, opened to mixed reviews and a worldwide total of $356.7 million.

=== Fantastic Beasts series (2016–2022) ===
Yates directed Fantastic Beasts and Where to Find Them, a 2016 film which is the first in a series of five instalments based on J. K. Rowling's book, set in the world of her Harry Potter novels. David Heyman and Harry Potter screenwriter Steve Kloves joined Yates and J. K. Rowling in developing the script. The film was released in November 2016, it received generally positive reviews and was a commercial success having grossed $814 million. It stars Eddie Redmayne, Katherine Waterston, Dan Fogler, Alison Sudol, Ezra Miller, Colin Farrell, and Johnny Depp.

Yates directed the 2018 sequel, Fantastic Beasts: The Crimes of Grindelwald which received mixed critical reception but emerged a box office success having grossed $654 million. In an interview with The Hollywood Reporter, he stated he was open to directing all five planned films in the Fantastic Beasts series. He returned to direct the third film, Fantastic Beasts: The Secrets of Dumbledore in 2022 which also received mixed critical reception and grossed $407 million worldwide, making it a box office disappointment and the lowest-grossing film in the Wizarding World franchise.

=== Pain Hustlers and current work (2023–present) ===
Yates next directed the drama film Pain Hustlers, starring Emily Blunt and Chris Evans, for Netflix. Production began on 22 August 2022 and the film was released on 27 October 2023.

== Wychwood Media ==
Yates founded production company Wychwood Media with Lewis Taylor. In May 2022, Sister entered a first-look deal with Wychwood Media.

== Personal life ==
Yates has a younger brother and an elder sister. He is married to Yvonne Walcott. He is the uncle of former professional footballer Theo Walcott.

== Directorial style ==
Commenting on their work on Harry Potter, Emma Watson stated that Yates liked to push the cast and crew to physical and emotional extremes, with Gary Oldman confirming Yates's preference for working slowly by shooting numerous takes to draw the finest performances out of the cast. Yates has been influenced by such directors as Steven Spielberg, David Lean, and Ken Loach. Yates's style of work includes social and political themes, character-driven narratives, realism, and atmospheric drama.

== Filmography ==
=== Feature film ===
Year	Title	Director	Producer
1998	The Tichborne Claimant	Yes	No
2007	Harry Potter and the Order of the Phoenix	Yes	No
2009	Harry Potter and the Half-Blood Prince	Yes	No
2010	Harry Potter and the Deathly Hallows – Part 1	Yes	No
2011	Harry Potter and the Deathly Hallows – Part 2	Yes	No
2016	The Legend of Tarzan	Yes	Executive
2016	Fantastic Beasts and Where to Find Them	Yes	No
2018	Fantastic Beasts: The Crimes of Grindelwald	Yes	No
2022	Fantastic Beasts: The Secrets of Dumbledore	Yes	No
2023	Pain Hustlers	Yes	Yes

=== Short film ===
Year	Title	Director	Writer	Producer
1988	When I Was a Girl	Yes	Yes	Yes
1991	The Weaver's Wife	Yes	Yes	No
1991	Oranges and Lemons	Yes	No	No
1992	Good Looks	Yes	No	No
1996	Punch	Yes	No	No
2002	Rank	Yes	No	No

=== Television ===
TV series

Year	Title	Notes
1994–95	The Bill	5 episodes
2014	Tyrant	Episode "Pilot", also executive producer

Miniseries

- The Sins (2000) (3 episodes)
- The Way We Live Now (2001)
- State of Play (2003)
- Sex Traffic (2004)

TV movies

- The Young Visiters (2003)
- The Girl in the Café (2005)

Documentary series

Year	Title	Notes
1994	Moving Pictures	Episode "Low Budget"
1995	Tale of Three Seaside Towns	Co-directed with Alistair Clarke; Also producer

== Accolades ==
Only certain awards for Yates's direction are shown in this section. A complete list of awards for a project may be found on its article page.

Year	Award	Category	Title	Result
1991	Cork International Film Festival	Best European Short	When I Was a Girl	Won
1991	San Francisco International Film Festival: Golden Gate Award	Best Short Film	When I Was a Girl	Won
1991	Belfort Film Festival	Best Film	When I Was a Girl	Won
1992	Chicago International Film Festival: Silver Hugo	–	Good Looks	Won
1998	Emden Film Festival Award	–	The Tichborne Claimant	Nominated
2002	BAFTA: British Academy Television Award	Best Drama Serial	The Way We Live Now	Won
2003	BAFTA: British Academy Film Award	Best Short Film	Rank	Nominated
2003	Directors Guild of Great Britain	Outstanding Directorial Achievement in a TV Movie/Serial	State of Play	Won
2004	BAFTA: British Academy Television Award	Best Drama Serial	State of Play	Nominated
2004	Cologne Conference: TV Spielfilm Award	Best Fiction Programme	State of Play	Won
2004	Directors Guild of Great Britain	Outstanding Directorial Achievement in a TV Movie/Miniseries	Sex Traffic	Nominated
2005	BAFTA: British Academy Television Award	Best Drama Serial	Sex Traffic	Won
2005	Prix Italia	Best TV Movie or Miniseries	Sex Traffic	Won
2006	Cinema For Peace	Most valuable work of a director, producer or screenwriter	The Girl in the Café	Won
2006	Primetime Emmy Award	Outstanding Directing for a Miniseries, Movie or Dramatic Special	The Girl in the Café	Nominated
2008	Empire Award	Best Director	Harry Potter and the Order of the Phoenix	Won
2008	Saturn Award	Best Director	Harry Potter and the Order of the Phoenix	Nominated
2010	NFTS Honorary Fellowship	Outstanding Contribution to the British Film and Television Industry	–	Won
2011	BAFTA: Britannia Award (Los Angeles)	John Schlesinger Britannia Award for Excellence in Directing	Harry Potter; Order of the Phoenix, Half-Blood Prince, Deathly Hallows	Won
2011	Saturn Award	Best Director	Harry Potter and the Deathly Hallows – Part 1	Nominated
2011	Scream Award	Best Director	Harry Potter and the Deathly Hallows – Part 2	Nominated
2012	Saturn Award	Best Director	Harry Potter and the Deathly Hallows – Part 2	Nominated
2012	SFX Award	Best Director	Harry Potter and the Deathly Hallows – Part 2	Nominated
2012	Empire Award	Best Director	Harry Potter and the Deathly Hallows – Part 2	Won
2012	University of Essex	Honorary Degree	–	Won
2016	BAFTA: British Academy Film Award	Outstanding British Film	Fantastic Beasts and Where to Find Them	Nominated

== Notes ==
Preceded by Mike Newell	Harry Potter film director 2007–2011	Succeeded by End of Series
Preceded by Alan Parker	NFTS Honorary Fellowship; 2010	Succeeded by Jonathan Ross
