= 56th British Academy Film Awards =

2003 film awards ceremony

- Date: 23 February 2003
- Site: Odeon Leicester Square
- Hosted by: Stephen Fry

Highlights
- Best Film: The Pianist
- Best British Film: The Warrior
- Best Actor: Daniel Day-Lewis; Gangs of New York
- Best Actress: Nicole Kidman; The Hours
- Most awards: Chicago, The Hours, The Lord of the Rings: The Two Towers, The Pianist, Road to Perdition, and Talk to Her (2)
- Most nominations: Chicago and Gangs of New York (12)

The 56th British Academy Film Awards, more commonly known as the BAFTAs, took place on 23 February 2003 at the Odeon Leicester Square in London, honouring the best national and foreign films of 2002. Presented by the British Academy of Film and Television Arts, accolades were handed out for the best feature-length film and documentaries of any nationality that were screened at British cinemas in 2002.

The Pianist won Best Film and Best Director for Roman Polanski. Daniel Day-Lewis won Best Actor for Gangs of New York and Nicole Kidman won Best Actress for The Hours. Christopher Walken won Best Supporting Actor for Catch Me If You Can and Catherine Zeta-Jones won Best Supporting Actress for Chicago. The Warrior, directed by Asif Kapadia, was voted Outstanding British Film of 2002.

Stephen Fry hosted the ceremony for the second consecutive year.

== Winners and nominees ==
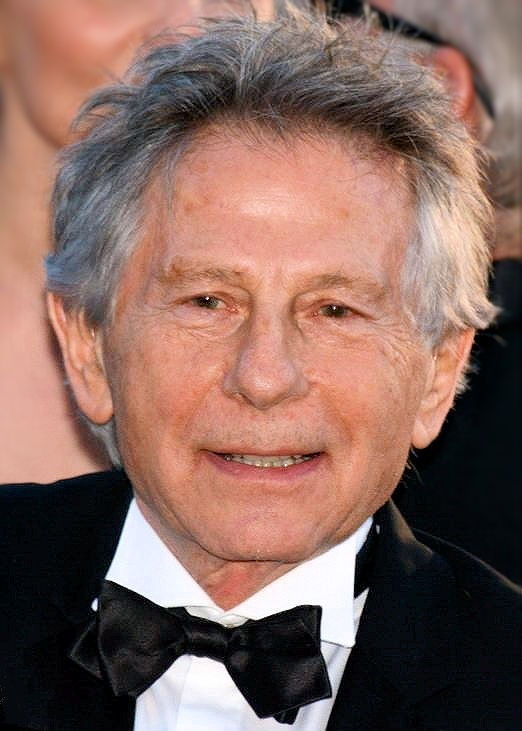
Roman Polanski, Best Director winner

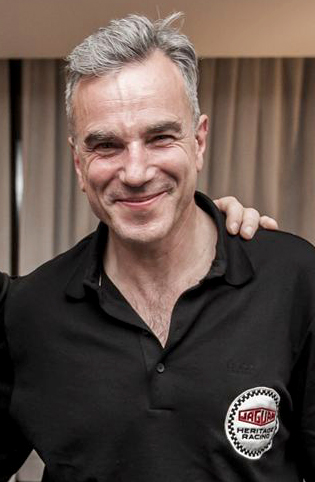
Daniel Day-Lewis, Best Actor winner

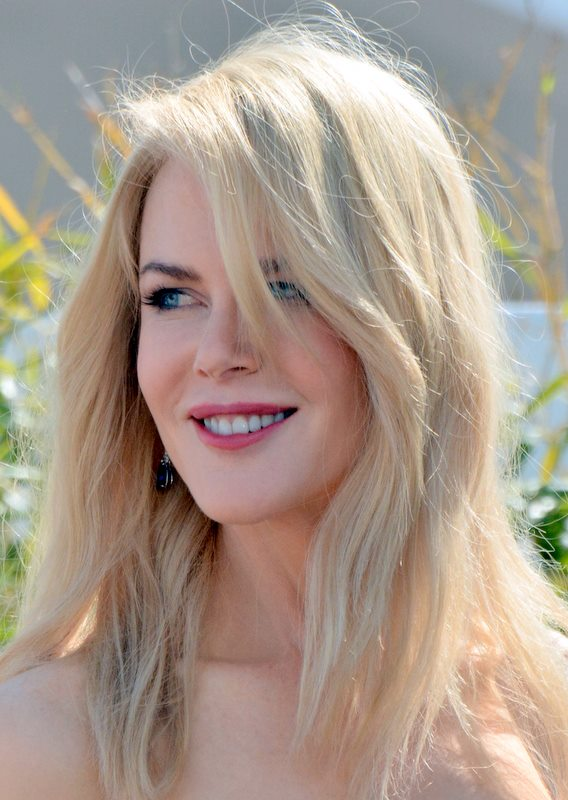
Nicole Kidman, Best Actress winner

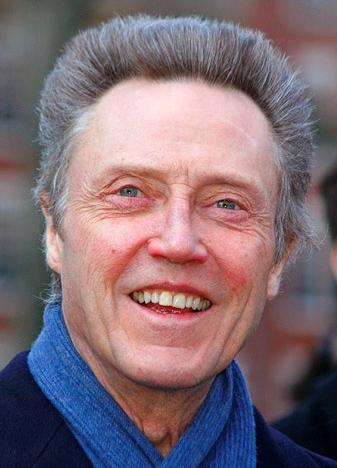
Christopher Walken, Best Supporting Actor winner

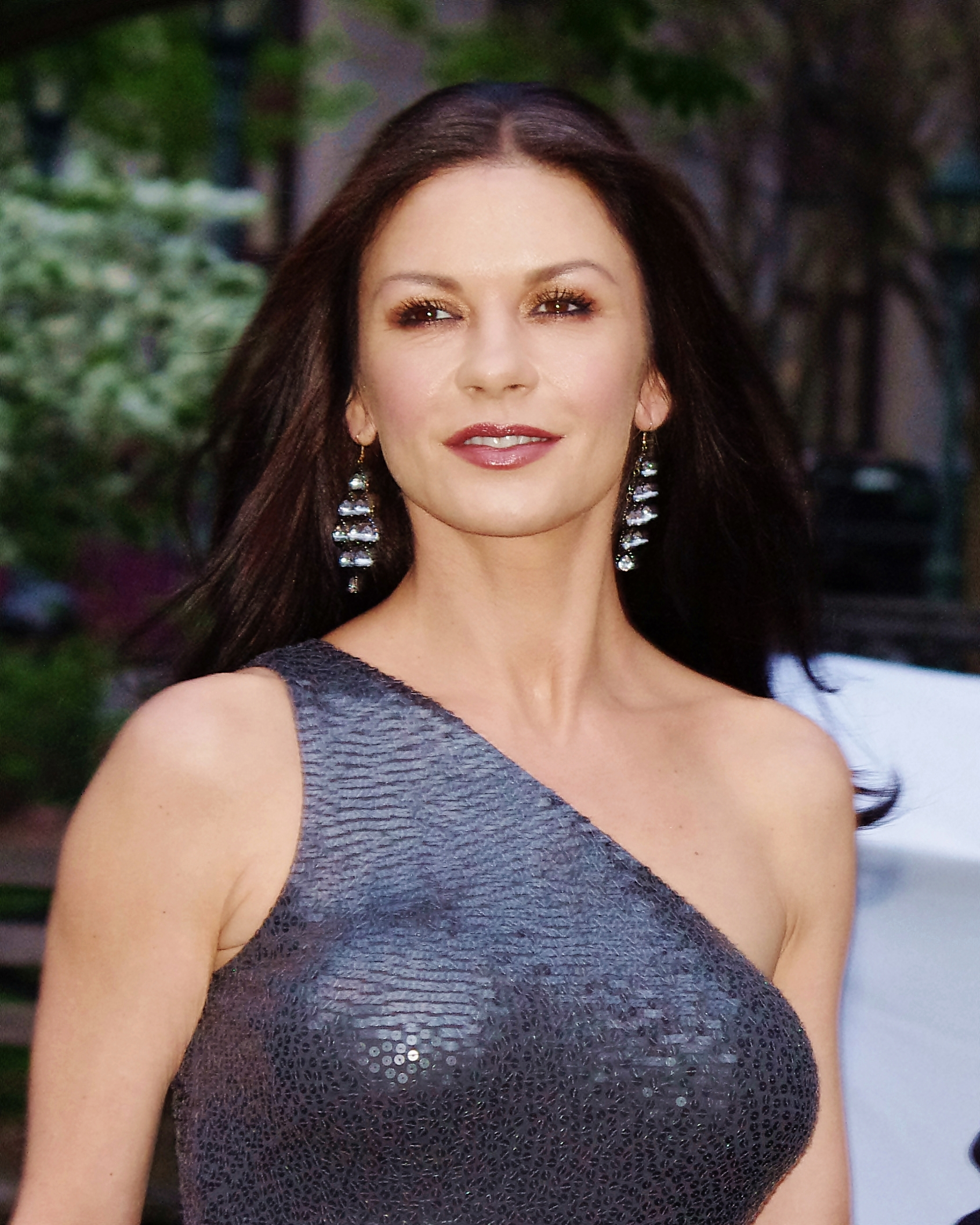
Catherine Zeta-Jones, Best Supporting Actress winner

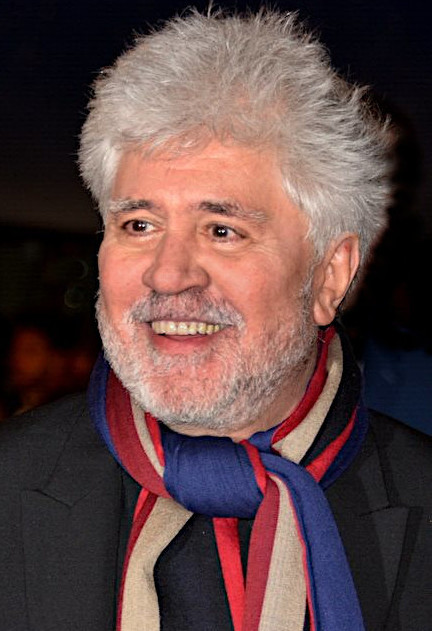
Pedro Almodóvar, Best Original Screenplay winner

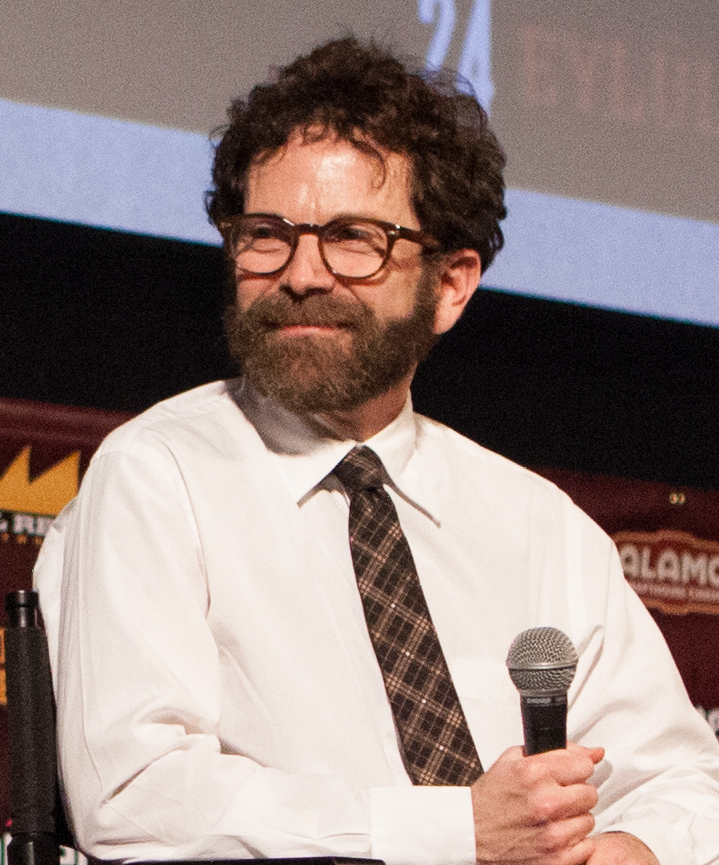
Charlie Kaufman, Best Adapted Screenplay co-winner

=== BAFTA Fellowship ===
- **Saul Zaentz**

=== Outstanding British Contribution to Cinema ===
- **Michael Stevenson** and **David Tomblin**

=== Awards ===
Winners are listed first and highlighted in boldface.

**Best Film**: **The Pianist – Roman Polanski, Robert Benmusso and Alain Sarde**; Chicago – Martin Richards; Gangs of New York – Alberto Grimaldi and Harvey Weinstein; The Hours – Scott Rudin and Robert Fox; The Lord of the Rings: The Two Towers – Barrie M. Osborne, Fran Walsh and Peter Jackson	**Best Direction**: **Roman Polanski – The Pianist**; Stephen Daldry – The Hours; Peter Jackson – The Lord of the Rings: The Two Towers; Rob Marshall – Chicago; Martin Scorsese – Gangs of New York
**Best Actor in a Leading Role**: **Daniel Day-Lewis – Gangs of New York as William Cutting**; Adrien Brody – The Pianist as Władysław Szpilman; Nicolas Cage – Adaptation as Charlie Kaufman / Donald Kaufman; Michael Caine – The Quiet American as Thomas Fowler; Jack Nicholson – About Schmidt as Warren Schmidt	**Best Actress in a Leading Role**: **Nicole Kidman – The Hours as Virginia Woolf**; Halle Berry – Monster's Ball as Leticia Musgrove; Salma Hayek – Frida as Frida Kahlo; Meryl Streep – The Hours as Clarissa Vaughan; Renée Zellweger – Chicago as Roxie Hart
**Best Actor in a Supporting Role**: **Christopher Walken – Catch Me If You Can as Frank Abagnale Sr.**; Chris Cooper – Adaptation as John Laroche; Ed Harris – The Hours as Richard Brown; Alfred Molina – Frida as Diego Rivera; Paul Newman – Road to Perdition as John Rooney	**Best Actress in a Supporting Role**: **Catherine Zeta-Jones – Chicago as Velma Kelly**; Toni Collette – About a Boy as Fiona Brewer; Julianne Moore – The Hours as Laura Brown; Queen Latifah – Chicago as Matron "Mama" Morton; Meryl Streep – Adaptation as Susan Orlean
**Best Original Screenplay**: **Talk to Her – Pedro Almodóvar**; Dirty Pretty Things – Steven Knight; Gangs of New York – Jay Cocks, Steven Zaillian and Kenneth Lonergan; The Magdalene Sisters – Peter Mullan; Y tu mamá también – Carlos Cuarón and Alfonso Cuarón	**Best Adapted Screenplay**: **Adaptation – Charlie Kaufman**; About a Boy – Peter Hedges, Chris Weitz and Paul Weitz; Catch Me If You Can – Jeff Nathanson; The Hours – David Hare; The Pianist – Ronald Harwood
**Best Cinematography**: **Road to Perdition – Conrad Hall**; Chicago – Dion Beebe; Gangs of New York – Michael Ballhaus; The Lord of the Rings: The Two Towers – Andrew Lesnie; The Pianist – Paweł Edelman	**Best Costume Design**: **The Lord of the Rings: The Two Towers – Ngila Dickson and Richard Taylor**; Catch Me If You Can – Mary Zophres; Chicago – Colleen Atwood; Frida – Julie Weiss; Gangs of New York – Sandy Powell
**Best Editing**: **City of God – Daniel Rezende**; Chicago – Martin Walsh; Gangs of New York – Thelma Schoonmaker; The Hours – Peter Boyle; The Lord of the Rings: The Two Towers – Michael J. Horton	**Best Makeup and Hair**: **Frida – Judy Chin, Beatrice De Alba, John E. Jackson and Regina Reyes**; Chicago – Jordan Samuel and Judi Cooper-Sealy; Gangs of New York – Manlio Rocchetti and Aldo Signoretti; The Hours – Ivana Primorac, Conor O'Sullivan and Jo Allen; The Lord of the Rings: The Two Towers – Peter Owen, Peter King and Richard Taylor
**Best Original Music**: **The Hours – Philip Glass**; Catch Me If You Can – John Williams; Chicago – Danny Elfman, John Kander and Fred Ebb; Gangs of New York – Howard Shore, Robbie Robertson and The Edge; The Pianist – Wojciech Kilar	**Best Production Design**: **Road to Perdition – Dennis Gassner**; Chicago – John Myhre; Gangs of New York – Dante Ferretti; Harry Potter and the Chamber of Secrets – Stuart Craig; The Lord of the Rings: The Two Towers – Grant Major
**Best Sound**: **Chicago – Michael Minkler, Dominick Tavella, David Lee and Maurice Schell**; Gangs of New York – Tom Fleischman, Ivan Sharrock, Eugene Gearty and Philip Stockton; Harry Potter and the Chamber of Secrets – Randy Thom, Dennis Leonard, John Midgley, Ray Merrin, Graham Daniel and Rick Kline; The Lord of the Rings: The Two Towers – Ethan Van der Ryn, David Farmer, Mike Hopkins, Hammond Peek, Christopher Boyes, Michael Semanick and Michael Hedges; The Pianist – Jean-Marie Blondel, Dean Humphreys and Gerard Hardy	**Best Special Visual Effects**: **The Lord of the Rings: The Two Towers – Jim Rygiel, Joe Letteri, Randall William Cook and Alex Funke**; Gangs of New York – Bruce Steinheimer, Michael Owens, Ed Hirsh and Jon Alexander; Harry Potter and the Chamber of Secrets – Jim Mitchell, Nick Davis, John Richardson, Bill George and Nick Dudman; Minority Report – Scott Farrar, Michael Lantieri, Nathan McGuinness and Henry LaBounta; Spider-Man – John Dykstra, Scott Stokdyk, Anthony LaMolinara and John Frazier
**Outstanding British Film**: **The Warrior – Bertrand Faivre and Asif Kapadia**; Bend It Like Beckham – Deepak Nayar and Gurinder Chadha; Dirty Pretty Things – Tracey Seaward, Robert Jones and Stephen Frears; The Hours – Scott Rudin, Robert Fox and Stephen Daldry; The Magdalene Sisters – Frances Higson and Peter Mullan	**Outstanding Debut by a British Writer, Director or Producer**: **The Warrior – Asif Kapadia (Writer/Director)**; AKA – Duncan Roy (Writer/Director); Christie Malry's Own Double-Entry – Simon Bent (Writer); Lost in La Mancha – Lucy Darwin (Producer)
**Best Short Animation**: **Fish Never Sleep – Gaëlle Denis**; The ChubbChubbs! – Jacquie Barnbrook, Eric Armstrong and Jeff Wolverton; The Dog Who Was a Cat Inside – Andrew Ruhemann, Siân Rees and Siri Melchoir; Sap – Lucie Wenigerová and Hyun-Joo Kim; Wedding Espresso – Jonathan Bairstow, Sandra Ensby and Lesley Glaister	**Best Short Film**: **My Wrongs 8245–8249 & 117 – Mark Herbert and Chris Morris**; Bouncer – Natasha Carlish, Sophie Morgan, Michael Baig-Clifford and Geoff Thompson; Candy Bar Kid – Benjamin Johns and Shan Khan; Good Night – Yoav Factor and Sun-Young Chun; The Most Beautiful Man in the World – Hugh Welchman and Alicia Duffy; Rank – Andrew O'Connell, David Yates and Robbie McCallum
**Best Film Not in the English Language**: **Talk to Her – Agustín Almodóvar and Pedro Almodóvar**; City of God – Andrea Barata Ribeiro, Mauricio Andrade Ramos and Fernando Meirelles; Devdas – Bharat Shah and Sanjay Leela Bhansali; The Warrior – Bertrand Faivre and Asif Kapadia; Y tu mamá también – Jorge Vergara and Alfonso Cuarón

== Statistics ==
Films that received multiple nominations
Nominations	Film
12	Chicago
12	Gangs of New York
11	The Hours
9	The Lord of the Rings: The Two Towers
7	The Pianist
4	Adaptation
4	Catch Me If You Can
4	Frida
3	Harry Potter and the Chamber of Secrets
3	Road to Perdition
3	The Warrior
2	About a Boy
2	City of God
2	Dirty Pretty Things
2	The Magdalene Sisters
2	Talk to Her
2	Y tu mamá también

Films that received multiple awards
Awards	Film
2	Chicago
2	The Hours
2	The Lord of the Rings: The Two Towers
2	The Pianist
2	Road to Perdition
2	Talk to Her
2	The Warrior

== See also ==
- 75th Academy Awards
- 28th César Awards
- 8th Critics' Choice Awards
- 55th Directors Guild of America Awards
- 16th European Film Awards
- 60th Golden Globe Awards
- 23rd Golden Raspberry Awards
- 7th Golden Satellite Awards
- 17th Goya Awards
- 18th Independent Spirit Awards
- 8th Lumière Awards
- 14th Producers Guild of America Awards
- 29th Saturn Awards
- 9th Screen Actors Guild Awards
- 55th Writers Guild of America Awards
