= Rank (film) =

- Directed by: David Yates
- Screenplay by: Robbie McCallum
- Produced by: Andrew O'Connell
- Cinematography: Ryszard Lenczewski
- Edited by: Mark Day; Rex Perkins
- Production company: P45 Films
- Release date: 2002
- Running time: 14 minutes
- Country: United Kingdom
- Language: English

Rank is a 2002 fourteen-minute short film directed by David Yates. It was nominated for the British Academy Film Award for Best Short Film at the BAFTAs.

== Development ==
Producer Andrew O'Connell said "We first went to the London Production Fund who gave us the full grant of £15,000. Then we approached Scottish Screen but as we were not a Scots production company they could only give us £5,000. We got Scottish co-producers, re-applied and got £25,000. We also got a lot of deals on post production and post production finance from The First Film Foundation – who are backed by UGC and Universal".

In an interview with Film London, director David Yates stated that he "wanted to use non actors to tell the story, to create a reality. It was also a big break for our writer, Robbie – because it was essentially his first film and for all the kids we cast in Glasgow who had never done a film before." He went on to say that he had "just finished a period drama called The Way We Live Now, which had taken me a year, and which was a very big production ... but fairly formal in many ways as a piece of work ... this [Rank] was an opportunity to just shake all of that off and get back to my roots."

== Plot ==
Rank tells the story of a street gang that cross Glasgow to witness the arrival of a group of Somali refugees. The themes of racism, friendship and adolescence are reflected throughout the film.

== Cast ==
- Brian Dunn as Twist
- Christopher Gorman as Gerrad
- Ian Jarvie as Noel
- William McLachlan as Spartacus
- Rudi Neequaye as Aziz
- Stephen Ross as Frankie
- Owen Gorman as Janitor
- Steven Leach as Council Official (as Stephen Leach)
- Shouakat Hussain as Shop Owner

== Crew ==
Paul Nolan and David Smith were the executive producers of the film and the first assistant director to David Yates was Dave Tarvit. The production designer was Nikie McCallum and the costume designers were Arnalie Harper Gow and Anna Lau. Makeup was designed by Fiona Maynard.
