= Arthur Orton =

English imposter (1834–1898)

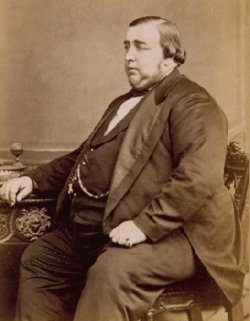
- Arthur Orton, 1872
- Born: 20 March 1834; Wapping, Middlesex, England
- Died: 1 April 1898 (aged 64); Marylebone, County of London, England
- Other name: Thomas Castro
- Occupation: Butcher
- Years active: 1866–1898
- Known for: Tichborne Case

Arthur Orton (20 March 1834 – 1 April 1898) was an English man who has generally been identified by legal historians and commentators as the "Tichborne Claimant", who in two celebrated court cases both fascinated and shocked Victorian society in the 1860s and 1870s.

The son of a London butcher, Orton went to sea as a boy, spent a year in Chile, and worked as a butcher and stockman for squatters in Australia in the middle-to-late 1850s. In 1866 Thomas Castro, a butcher from Wagga Wagga in Australia, claimed to be Roger Tichborne, the heir to the Tichborne estates and baronetcy who had been declared lost at sea in 1854. During the protracted court proceedings that followed Castro's claim, evidence was produced that Castro might in fact be Arthur Orton, attempting to secure the Tichborne fortunes by imposture.

The verdict of the jury in Regina versus Castro (1873–74) was that Castro was not Roger Tichborne, and that he was Arthur Orton. He was sentenced to fourteen years imprisonment for perjury. After his release he lived in great poverty, still insisting that he was Tichborne. In 1895 he confessed to being Orton, but about one year later he retracted his confession. He died in 1898; the Tichborne family allowed a coffin plate bearing the names "Sir Roger Charles Doughty Tichborne" to be placed on the coffin, not because his claim had been conceded, but because "[n]o legal means of preventing such an outrage existed".

Commentators have generally concurred with the court's verdict that the Claimant was Orton, but some 20th-century analysts have raised uncertainties about this accepted view, and have suggested that, although the Orton identity remains the most likely, a lingering doubt persists.

== Biography ==
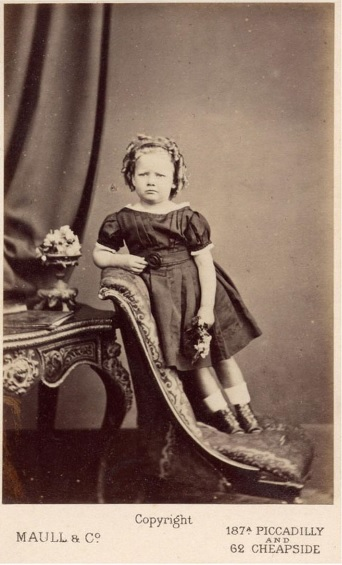
Arthur Orton's daughter Theresa Mary Agnes Orton (1866–1939), photographed in London c. 1871.

Orton was born at Wapping, London, the son of George Orton, a butcher and purveyor of ships' stores.

In November 1852 he sailed for Tasmania aboard the Middleton and arrived at Hobart in May 1853. There, Orton worked for several butchers. There is some evidence he was a heavy drinker; and for minor trade malpractices, he appeared before magistrates. The Hobart Mercury of 1 Aug 1855 reports on the case of 'Fane v. Orton' in the Mayor's Court in which the City Surveyor brought a charge of 'offering for sale...unwholesome meat, unfit for human food' against 'Arthur Orton, butcher, Macquarie-street' to which Orton pleaded guilty. In October 1855, Orton appeared on a charge of obtaining money under false pretences brought by Frederick Dight, after Orton had been a witness against Dight in an earlier Supreme Court trial, but the case was dismissed.

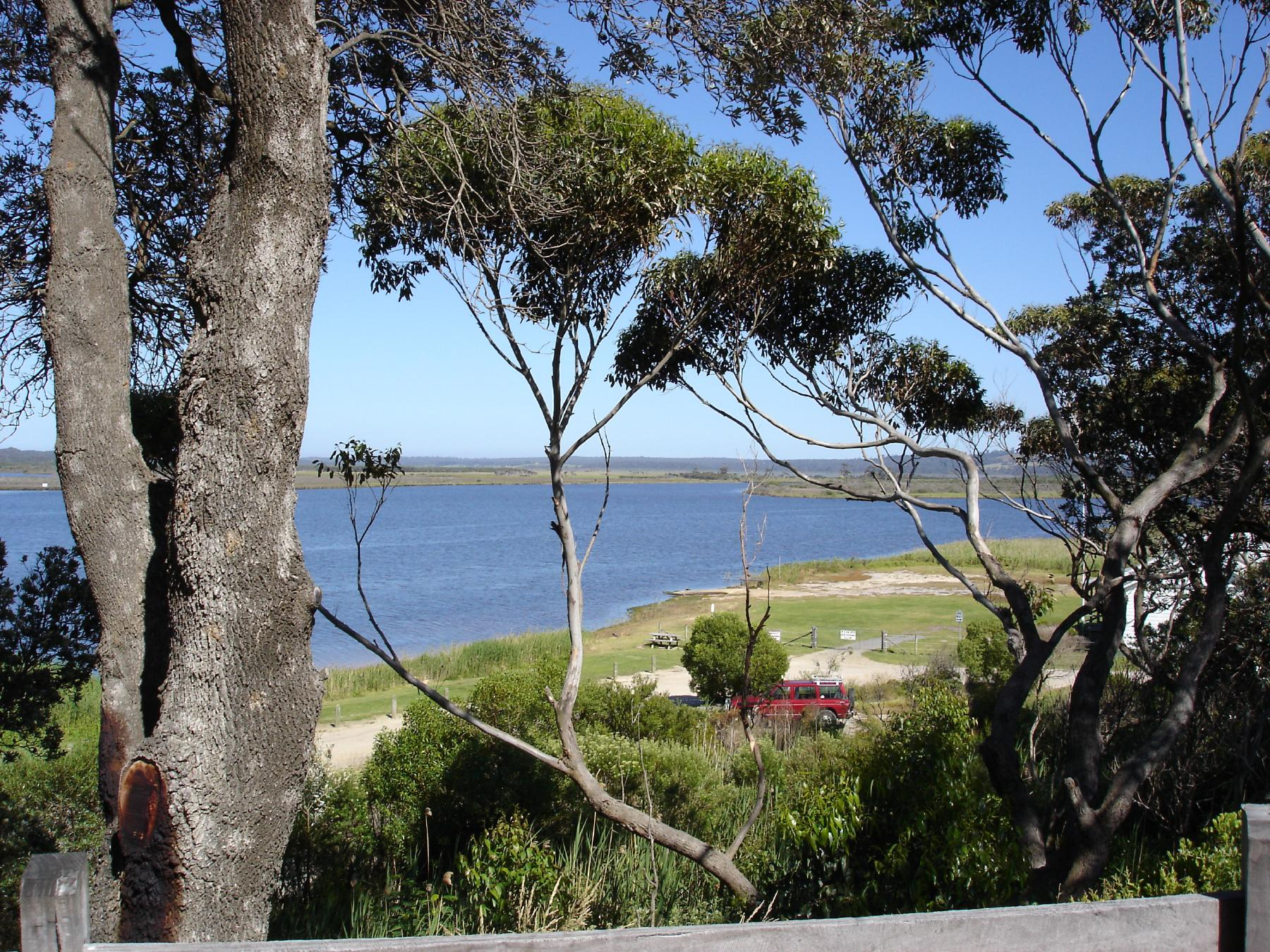
Contemporary view of Port Albert, Gippsland. Arthur Orton landed there as a passenger on the schooner 'Eclipse' after leaving Tasmania for mainland Australia in 1855.

From 1855 to the mid-1860s there is little detail about his life, but he appears to have pursued gold prospecting, mail-running and pastoral station-hand work, with a suggestion of bushranging and even murder. Orton left Hobart as a passenger on schooner Eclipse on 16 November 1855 bound for Port Albert on the coast of Gippsland, Victoria. He worked for some time on squatters 'runs' in the district. While employed at one he was said to have written 'on a fly-leaf of one of the station novels' and this was later offered as evidence that Orton did not have the education that would have been expected of Tichborne:

"This day i have received a letter from Donald MacDonald. With the Seal Broken. i Arthur Orton here make a vow on this Book. Although not a Bible. It bear a cross, That i am a man of Bone Blood and flesh. That i will find out the Man if Possible. That broke the said Seal. And that i will punish him according to the laws of, My Countrie.
Sined Arthur Orton
Dargo
11 March 1858"

In May 1856, he appears in a subscription list, donating £2, for 'the Patriotic Fund from the Upper District of Gippsland' as a stockman and 'one of the men' of 'Mewburn Park'. In April 1859, a letter to the editor of the 'Gippsland Guardian' mentions Orton, 'who was in charge of the Dargo station', and recounts Orton's testimony in relation to 'the mysterious disappearance of William Henry Clare alias Ballaarat Harry, and Thomas Took'.

Orton's letters to England while he was in Hobart showed he was fond of dogs and children and affectionate towards his girlfriend in Wapping. However a personal notice in a Hobart newspaper from May 1856 – 'If this should meet the eye of Arthur Orton, formerly of 69, Wapping, London, by applying on board the "Irene", he will hear of his friends.' – after he had departed for Victoria raises the question of when the correspondence may have ended.

== Tichborne claimant ==
In August 1865 advertisements appeared in Australian newspapers asking for information about the fate of Roger Charles Tichborne (born 1829), who had been on a vessel, Bella, which had disappeared at sea off the coast of South America in 1854. This advertisement had been inserted by Lady Tichborne, the missing man's mother, who believed her son was still alive. Roger Tichborne had, however, been presumed dead by the courts and his younger brother had thus succeeded to the Tichborne baronetcy and the family's estates.

In 1866, through his solicitor William Gibbes, a butcher in Wagga Wagga known as "Thomas Castro" came forward, claiming to be the missing Sir Roger. He appeared to have some knowledge of the missing man's background and family history, although many of his assertions were inaccurate or false. However, at Gibbes's prompting he wrote to Lady Tichborne and was invited to come to England to be recognised.

Whilst living in England, he stayed at Essex Lodge in Thornton Heath with Lady Tichborne. According to author Bernard Falk, her religious sensibilities were offended by the great usage he and his invited guests made of alcohol and tobacco, so she moved out.

It is the contention of most historians that the Claimant was Arthur Orton, who may have at some point during his travels encountered Roger Tichborne, whose identity Orton then adopted.

== Recognition, doubt and legal process ==
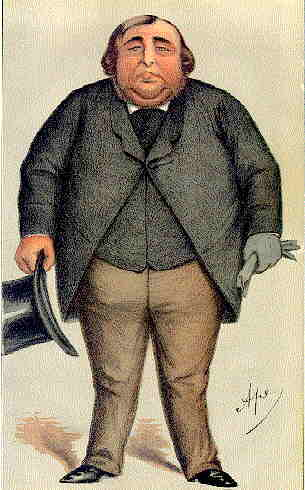
Orton as portrayed in Vanity Fair by ''Ape' June 1871

The Scotland Yard detective Jack Whicher discovered that immediately on his arrival in England in December 1866 the Claimant visited Wapping and made enquiries about the Orton family. When this visit was made public during the legal processes, it was presented as strong evidence that the Claimant was indeed Arthur Orton. However, Lady Tichborne recognised him as her son with complete certainty; he was likewise accepted as Roger by numerous family servants and professional advisers. In his analysis of the affair, Rohan McWilliam considers the extent of recognition remarkable, given the physical bulk and unrefined manners of the Claimant, as compared with the Roger Tichborne of 1854. Almost all the rest of the Tichborne family considered the Claimant an imposter. Nevertheless, he obtained much financial support for the prosecution of his claim, which went ahead despite the death of Lady Tichborne in 1868. After a lengthy civil hearing the jury dismissed the Claimant's case to be Sir Roger; he was then arrested and tried for perjury under the name of Thomas Castro. In the trial that followed the jury declared that he was not Roger Tichborne and identified him on the evidence as Arthur Orton. He was sentenced to 14 years' imprisonment, of which he served 10 before his release on licence in 1884.

== Appraisal ==
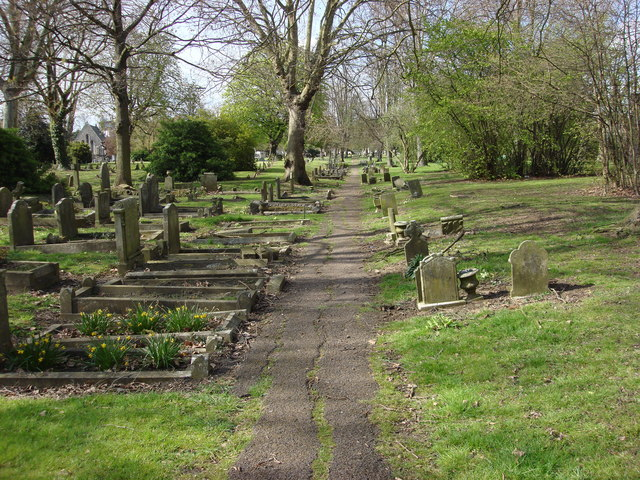
Paddington Cemetery, the Claimant's burial place

After his release the Claimant continued to press his claim, but gradually lost his following. By the mid-1890s he was impoverished; in 1895, for a fee of several hundred pounds, he published a confession in The People that he was Orton. However, almost immediately he repudiated this confession, and styled himself once again as Sir Roger Tichborne. He died on 1 April 1898 in impoverished circumstances, and was given a pauper's burial in Paddington Cemetery. In "an act of extraordinary generosity", the Tichborne family allowed a card bearing the name "Sir Roger Charles Doughty Tichborne" to be placed on the coffin before its interment. This "generosity" is disputed by author Bernard Falk, who stated that "No legal means existed to prevent" a named coffin plate claiming the Baronet's title being attached.

The modern consensus is that the Claimant was Orton, who had used family information obtained from gullible or self-serving supporters. However, in his 1957 account of the case, Douglas Woodruff insists that at least some degree of doubt as to the Claimant's true identity must remain. Woodruff argues the sheer improbability of anyone conceiving such an imposture from scratch and at such a distance: "[I]t was carrying effrontery beyond the bounds of sanity if Arthur Orton embarked with a wife and retinue and crossed the world, knowing that they would all be destitute if he did not succeed in convincing a woman he had never met and knew nothing about first-hand, that he was her son". Orton's cause continued to be upheld during the 20th century by his eldest daughter – one of four children borne him by his wife – who lived until 1926.

== In popular culture ==
He was fictionalized by Jorge Luis Borges in Tom Castro, The Implausible Impostor, written between 1933 and 1934 and published in A Universal History of Iniquity in 1935.

Orton was portrayed by actors Hugh Keays-Byrne in The Tichborne Affair and Robert Pugh in The Tichborne Claimant, dramas about the case.

Zadie Smith's 2023 novel The Fraud features the Tichborne trial and the circumstances around it.

== See also ==
- List of impostors

== Sources ==
- McWilliam, Rohan (2007). The Tichborne Claimant: A Victorian Sensation. London: Hambledon Continuum. ISBN 978-1-85285-478-2.
- Woodruff, Douglas (1957). The Tichborne Claimant: A Victorian Mystery. London: Hollis & Carter.
