= Theresa Doughty Tichborne =

Daughter of Claimant in the Tichborne Case

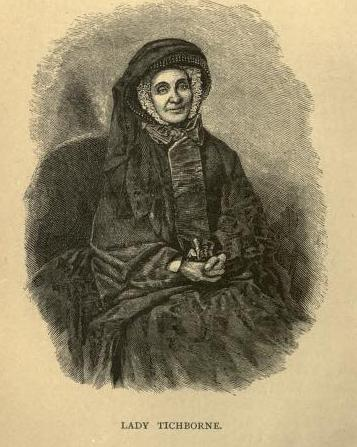
Lady Tichborne, Sir Roger Tichborne's mother, who recognised Theresa's father's claim. Some of Theresa's earliest memories were of staying with Lady Tichborne.

Theresa Mary Doughty Tichborne or Orton (1866–1939) was the daughter of Arthur Orton, a claimant in the 19th century Tichborne case, who continued her father's claim into the 1920s.

== Early life ==
Born Agnes, in Wagga Wagga, New South Wales, Australia, in 1866, Tichborne was the eldest daughter of Arthur Orton. She was nine months old when she traveled to England with her parents after her father was invited to meet with Lady Tichborne, mother of the missing Tichborne heir. Theresa recalled that one of her earliest memories was being called 'Little Miss Tichborne' when she stayed with Lady Tichborne 'on several occasions'.

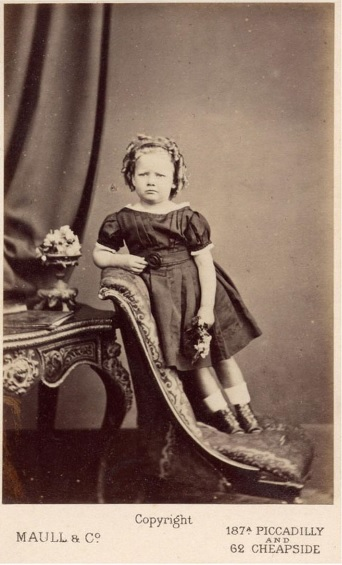
Mary Agnes Theresa Tichborne photographed in London (c1871)

At age five she was included in the 1871 English census as 'Teresa M. Tichborne', and used the name Theresa Mary Doughty Tichborne, or Theresa Mary Agnes Doughty Tichborne, in the years that followed. In her professional life, as an actress, she also used the names 'Agnes Tichborne' and the surname 'Alexander'.

In 1884, her father, who had been found not to be the missing heir, Sir Roger Tichborne, and sentenced for perjury in 1873, was released, and Theresa acted as his secretary during his mid-1880s lecture tour. Theresa later said she left the secretary's role because of her father's drunkenness and personal conduct. She was also to reveal, in 1924, that it was during this time that her father told her that he was Sir Roger Tichborne, and had shot, and killed, Arthur Orton, in Australia before taking his name.

Following her departure from the lecture tour she worked as an actress, and a barmaid. For a time, in the late 1880s, she socialised with Henry Alfred Joseph Doughty-Tichborne, 12th Baronet Tichborne, known as 'Goldie', a grandson of Lady Tichborne, who had succeeded to the Tichborne baronetcy as 12th Baronet after his father's death, and Arthur Orton's unsuccessful claim.

== 1913 arrest ==
In June 1913, Theresa was remanded 'on a charge of threatening to murder' Miss Denise Fulke Greville, fiancée of the then baronet Sir Joseph Tichborne. The substance of the charge was in a letter she sent to the Earl of Granard:

"I have just seen the announcement of the approaching marriage of my cousin, Joseph Tichborne. I have asked you to use your influence to make them give me some of the money they stole from us, but you do nothing. It is nothing to you if I starve, as long as you and your wife can give parties and flaunt about with people who, if they knew the truth, would be ashamed to know you.

You cannot hide any more, for I am making you an accessory before the fact by telling you that I am going to shoot that girl rather than Joseph shall marry her and they shall live on my money. I am going to do it. Now hide, and pretend you think I don't mean it." (Note: The final paragraph of the letter varies slightly in two published accounts. This is the more complete of the two.)

A second letter, in the same handwriting, was also produced which warned 'Colonel Stratton Bates' that 'the ladies of his family' should not attend the wedding and would 'be safer elsewhere'.

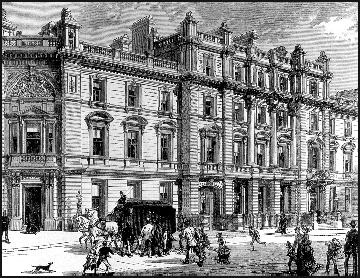
Bow Street Police Court where Theresa was remanded in 1913.

At the remand hearing, held at the Bow Street Police Court in London, Theresa 'protested that she did not intend to do any harm to Miss Grenville' and 'her only motive' in writing to Granard (who was married to wealthy American heiress Beatrice Mills) was 'to attract attention to her case'.

The issue of Theresa and her late father's names was the subject of exchanges at the hearing. When the prosecutor stated that 'The defendant represents herself to be the daughter of Arthur Orton', she responded 'I never said so, I said Sir Roger Tichborne'. Similarly, when the arresting officer referred to the arrest warrant being made out in the name of 'Alexander', she explained 'Alexander is my stage name. My correct-name is Theresa Mary Doughty Tichborne'. She was remanded until the following Friday and then granted bail.

A second charge of blackmail was added in early July and at trial, later that month, it was revealed that she had 'for years past... annoyed the Tichborne family' and 'to members of which she had sent begging letters' which 'verged on blackmail'. Sir Joseph's father, the late Sir Henry Tichborne, had 'charitably given the accused £25, which she had accepted as an acknowledgement of her connection with the family' and, following this, she had asked Sir Joseph 'to give her £10,000 and she would not worry him any further'. She had also sent another letter accusing Sir Joseph's mother of destroying Sir Henry's will.

Theresa was found guilty of blackmail and sentenced to six months imprisonment. The following year, as 'Theresa Alexander', she was successful in her application to the court to have her sister stand surety on her £100 twelve-month good behavior bond.

== 1924 arrest ==
In September 1923, Theresa appeared at the Clerkenwell Police Court charged with 'publishing a defamatory libel concerning Sir Joseph Tichborne'. She had previously been charged with 'writing a letter threatening to murder Sir George Lewis, the solicitor' and would be, the prosecutor stated, shortly facing 'fresh charges... of demanding money by menace'. Described in a news report as a 'tall woman of dignified appearance', she was said to have sent 'a series of amazing letters' in which she claimed Sir Joseph Tichborne had bribed her to commit suicide. In the earliest letter, sent to the Coroner of Brockenhurst, where she was living, she wrote:

"A man named Draper came to see me last Saturday, and told me he was from Sir Joseph Tichborne. He said he wondered I did not feel suicidal with all these debts hanging over me. I said I often did. He then told me my cousin, Sir Joseph, had told him he would pay anything to know I was dead.

I asked if he thought he would pay my debts if I were dead, and he said, "Rather." I wrote to my cousin, Sir Joseph, last week, and I said I will accept his offer and take my own life."

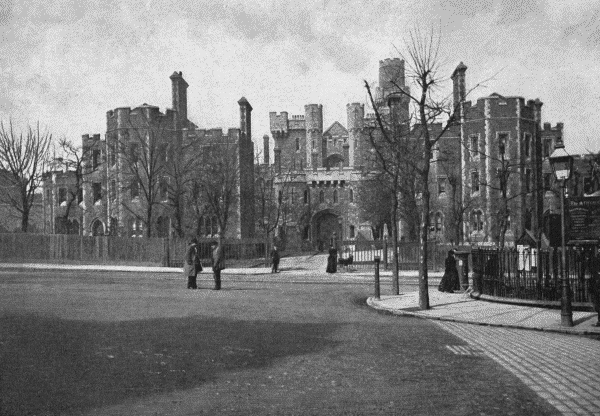
Theresa Tichbourne served a 12-month sentence in HM Prison Holloway in 1924.

After this she wrote to Sir Joseph Tichborne stating that she had 'applied to the Magistrates... to protect me against you' and added 'The suggestion is that I should give up the claim to the Tichborne estates and my name and relationship on the consideration that you give me sufficient income. I am owing in Brocklehurst £3000'. After writing to the solicitors Lewis and Lewis requesting £50, she wrote again to Sir Joseph stating that if the solicitors 'do not come to a settlement' she would go to the Tichborne estate and 'commit suicide, as you suggest I should do'. To George Lewis she wrote 'If I am to shoot some one like you before committing suicide... there wouldn't be much chance of the matter being hushed up again'. While to the actress Gladys Cooper, she referred to an earlier correspondence where she 'warned' Cooper to 'stay away' from Sir Joseph and his wife, before repeating the suicide claim and asking 'would you lend me a few pounds by the morning?'.

Theresa was brought to trial in October 1923 and was sentenced to one year in prison for 'writing threatening letters' and attempting to 'extort money from the Tichborne family by threats to kill them'. Upon her release she was given a twelve-month good behavior bond with £300 of her own money and two sureties of £100 each. She was unable to find the sureties and was returned to jail.

== Later life ==
In October 1924, Theresa gave an interview to the London newspaper The People. In it she said that during her time in HM Prison Holloway she believed herself to be dying and wrote to the Home Office to confide a secret she said her late father had told her in 1885: 'I'm Roger Tichborne. Arthur Orton, whom I'm supposed to be, was my confederate in many exploits in Australia. I shot him dead at Wagga Wagga, during a quarrel, in which he threatened to expose me.' Her late father's visit to find the Orton family in Wapping in 1866 had only been 'carried out for the purpose of discovering if the family had been apprised of the murder'. She added that 'her sister had dissuaded her' when she planned to reveal this 'secret' at her 1913 trial.

Theresa maintained in 1924 that she had also 'been a victim of "The Case"'. She died at Tunbridge Wells, Kent, England, aged 73 years, in 1939.
