= The Assam Garden =

1985 film

- Theatrical release poster
- Directed by: Mary McMurray
- Written by: Elisabeth Bond
- Produced by: Nigel Stafford-Clark
- Starring: Deborah Kerr; Madhur Jaffrey; Alec McCowen; Zia Mohyeddin; Anton Lesser; Iain Cuthbertson
- Cinematography: Bryan Loftus
- Music by: Richard Harvey
- Distributed by: Contemporary Films Ltd.
- Release date: June 4, 1985
- Running time: 92 min.
- Country: United Kingdom
- Language: English
- Budget: £600,000

The Assam Garden is a 1985 British drama film directed by Mary McMurray and produced by Nigel Stafford-Clark with Peter Jaques as associate producer. Made by Moving Picture Company and distributed by Contemporary Films Ltd., it was written by Elisabeth Bond. The music score was by Richard Harvey and the cinematography by Bryan Loftus.

The film stars Deborah Kerr and Madhur Jaffrey with Alec McCowen, Zia Mohyeddin, Anton Lesser and Iain Cuthbertson. It is Kerr’s final feature film appearance before her retirement from acting in 1986 and death in 2007.

The film was shot at Priors Mesne in Aylburton, Gloucestershire, England. At certain times of the year the garden is opened as part of the NGS (Gardens open for Charity) Scheme. In addition part of the land owned by Priors Mesne and run by the owners is now a Deer Park.

== Plot ==
The recently widowed and somewhat cold Mrs. Graham (Deborah Kerr) discovers that her late husband's expansive garden has been selected for consideration as a "Great British Garden". Mrs Graham then devotes her days to tending the garden that her husband had devoted his life to, in the hopes of it being selected for this honour. While gardening, Mrs. Graham encounters and develops a close friendship with her neighbor, Mrs. Lal. Through working in the garden with Mrs. Lal, Mrs. Graham finds some joy and warmth in life.

However, Mrs. Lal is homesick for her native India and at the end of the film, returns to India, leaving Mrs. Graham alone again. Mrs. Graham also learns that her husband left debts and she may be forced to sell her house and beloved garden, just when it looks like it has qualified for the Great British Garden list. The film ends with Mrs. Graham standing alone in the garden calling to her late husband to not leave her.

== Cast ==
- Deborah Kerr as Helen Graham
- Ronald Russell as Mr. Grace
- Daisy Bell as Elsie Edison
- Peggy Ann Wood as Mrs. Grace
- Iain Cuthbertson as Arthur
- Paul Bown as Water Board Man
- Madhur Jaffrey as Ruxmani
- Waseem Aziz as Vijay
- Zia Mohyeddin as Mr. Lal
- Alec McCowen as Mr. Philpott
- Paula Jacobs as Carol

== Award nomination ==
Year	Award ceremony	Category	Nominee	Result
1987	David di Donatello	Best Foreign Actress	Deborah Kerr	Nominated
