= 2002 British Academy Television Awards =

UK television awards ceremony

- Date: 21 April 2002
- Site: Theatre Royal, Drury Lane
- Hosted by: Chris Tarrant

Highlights
- Best Comedy Series: The Sketch Show
- Best Drama: Cold Feet
- Best Actor: Michael Gambon; Perfect Strangers
- Best Actress: Julie Walters; My Beautiful Son
- Best Comedy Performance: Ricky Gervais The Office

Television coverage
- Channel: ITV
- Ratings: 6.82 million

The 2002 British Academy Television Awards were held on Sunday 21 April 2002. The ceremony was hosted by the television presenter Chris Tarrant and broadcast on ITV the following day.

== Winners ==
- Best Actor
  - Winner: Michael Gambon – Perfect Strangers (BBC Two)
  - Other nominees: Alan Bates – Love in a Cold Climate (BBC One); Timothy Spall – Vacuuming Completely Nude in Paradise (BBC Two); David Suchet – The Way We Live Now (BBC One)
- Best Actress
  - Winner: Julie Walters – My Beautiful Son (ITV)
  - Other nominees: Lindsay Duncan – Perfect Strangers (BBC Two); Sheila Hancock – The Russian Bride (ITV); Lesley Sharp – Bob & Rose (ITV)
- Best Comedy (Programme or Series)
  - Winner: The Sketch Show (Avalon Television / Baby Cow Productions / ITV)
  - Other nominees: BrassEye Special (TalkBack Productions / Channel 4); Bremner, Bird and Fortune (Vera Productions / Channel 4); The Kumars at No. 42 (Hat Trick Productions / BBC Two)
- Best Comedy Performance
  - Winner: Ricky Gervais – The Office (BBC Two)
  - Other nominees: Kathy Burke – Gimme Gimme Gimme (BBC Two); Robert Lindsay – My Family (BBC One); Joanna Lumley – Absolutely Fabulous (BBC One)
- Best Drama Serial
  - Winner: The Way We Live Now (BBC / WGBH / Deep Indigo / BBC One)
  - Other nominees: Bob and Rose (Red Production Company / ITV); Perfect Strangers (TalkBack Productions / BBC Two); The Russian Bride (Monogram Productions / ITV)
- Best Drama Series
  - Winner: Cold Feet (Granada Television / ITV)
  - Other nominees: At Home with the Braithwaites (Yorkshire Television / ITV); Clocking Off (Red Production Company / BBC One); Tales from Pleasure Beach (Blast Film Productions / BBC Two)
- Best Single Drama
  - Winner: When I Was 12 (BBC / BBC Two)
  - Other nominees: My Beautiful Son (Granada Television / ITV); The Navigators (Parallex Films / Channel 4); Othello (London Weekend Television / ITV)
- Best Soap Opera
  - Winner: EastEnders (BBC / BBC One)
  - Other nominees: Coronation Street (Granada Television / ITV); Doctors (BBC / BBC One); Hollyoaks (Mersey Television / Channel 4)
- Best Current Affairs
  - Winner: Dispatches: Beneath the Veil (Hardcash Productions / Channel 4)
  - Other nominees: Endgame in Ireland (Brook Lapping / BBC Two); Panorama - Jeffrey Archer: A Life of Lies (BBC / BBC One); One Day of Terror – New York Witnesses (BBC / BBC Two)
- Best Entertainment Performance
  - Winner: Graham Norton – So Graham Norton (Channel 4)
  - Other nominees: Ant and Dec – Pop Idol (ITV); John Bird and John Fortune – Bremner, Bird and Fortune (Channel 4); Paul Merton – Have I Got News For You (Hat Trick Productions / BBC One)
- Best Factual Series or Strand
  - Winner: Horizon (BBC / BBC Two)
  - Other nominees: The Blue Planet (BBC / BBC One); Langan Behind the Lines (BBC / BBC Two); Welcome to Britain (BBC / BBC One)
- Best Feature
  - Winner: Faking It (RDF Media / Channel 4)
  - Other nominees: Farmer Wants a Wife (Thames Television / ITV); The Sound of Music Children: After They Were Famous (Tyne Tees Television / ITV); What Not to Wear (BBC / BBC Two)
- Flaherty Award for Single Documentary
  - Winner: Kelly and Her Sisters (Carlton Television / ITV)
  - Other nominees: True Stories – Battlecentre (Diverse Productions / Channel 4); Ellen MacArthur – Sailing Through Heaven and Hell (BBC Wales / BBC One); When Louis Met The Hamiltons (BBC / BBC One)
- Huw Wheldon Award for Specialist Factual
  - Winner: Arena – The Private Dirk Bogarde (Various / BBC Two)
  - Other nominees: The 1940s House (Wall to Wall / Channel 4); The Six Wives of Henry VIII (Granada Television / Channel 4); Walk On By: The Story of Popular Song (BBC / BBC Two)
- Best Entertainment Programme or Series
  - Winner: Pop Idol (Thames Television / 19 TV / ITV)
  - Other nominees: Have I Got News For You (Hat Trick Productions / BBC One); Parkinson (BBC / BBC One); Room 101 (Hat Trick Productions / BBC Two)
- News Coverage
  - Winner: September 11 – 12 (Sky News / Sky News)
  - Other nominees: Attack on America – 11 September (ITN / Channel 4); Attack on America – 11 September (ITN / ITV); The BBC News Coverage of the Fall of Kabul – 12 November – 13 November (BBC News / BBC One / BBC Two / BBC News 24)
- Situation Comedy Award
  - Winner: The Office (BBC / BBC One)
  - Other nominees: Gimme Gimme Gimme (Tiger Aspect Productions / Hartswood Films / BBC Two); Happiness (BBC / BBC Two); Spaced II (London Weekend Television / Channel 4)
- Sport
  - Winner: Channel 4 Cricket (Sunset + Vine / Channel 4)
  - Other nominees: British Grand Prix, Silverstone 2001 – Farewell to Murray Walker (Chrysalis Sport / Granada Sport / ITV); FA Cup Final 2001 – Liverpool vs Arsenal (ISN / Carlton Television / ITV); Germany vs England (BBC / BBC One)
- Innovation Award
  - Winner: Doubletake (Tiger Aspect Productions / BBC Two)
  - Other nominees: Banzai (RDF Media / E4 / Channel 4); The Blue Planet – The Deep (BBC / BBC One); BrassEye Special (TalkBack Productions / Channel 4)
- Special Award
  - BBC Natural History Unit
- The Alan Clarke Award
  - Verity Lambert
- The Dennis Potter Award
  - Stephen Poliakoff
- Academy Fellowship
  - Andrew Davies
- Special Award for Contribution to Television
  - Murray Walker
