= Directors Guild Trust =

Founded in 1985, the Directors Guild Trust is the sister charity arm of the Directors Guild of Great Britain. The Trust supports the wider remit of promoting British directors' art and craft to a national and international public through education, events, commemorations and memorials.

Currently the Trust runs the DIRECT ACCESS Feature Film Directors' Mentoring Scheme, sponsored by Skillset and Film Four and in recent years has created blue plaque memorials and celebrations for famous British film directors Sir David Lean, Michael Powell and Alexander McKendrick.

The Trust is based in Central London.
