= The Tichborne Claimant (film) =

- Directed by: David Yates
- Screenplay by: Joe Fisher
- Produced by: Tom McCabe
- Starring: John Kani; Robert Pugh; Stephen Fry; Robert Hardy; John Gielgud
- Cinematography: Peter Thwaites
- Edited by: Jamie Trevill
- Music by: Nicholas Hooper
- Production companies: The Bigger Picture Company; Swiftcall Internationally Telephone Company; Isle of Man Film Commission
- Distributed by: Redbus Film Distribution
- Release date: 12 November 1999
- Running time: 98 minutes
- Country: United Kingdom
- Language: English

The Tichborne Claimant is a 1998 British drama film directed by David Yates from a screenplay by Joe Fisher. The film stars John Kani, Robert Pugh, Stephen Fry, Robert Hardy and John Gielgud. It is based on the Tichborne case, a historical case of identity theft.

In 1854, Roger Tichborne, then-heir to the Tichborne Baronetcy, disappeared while traveling in South America. He was thought likely to have set sail with the ship Bella, which was shipwrecked off the coast of the Empire of Brazil, with no known survivors. In 1865, Thomas Castro, an Australian butcher, started claiming to be the missing heir. The dispute over his identity lasted to his death in 1898. While Castro is currently considered an impostor, doubts considering his real identity have persisted to the present.

== Plot ==
Based on the Tichborne case, the film is set in the late 19th century. The film concerns a claimant to the Tichborne Baronetcy.

Roger Tichborne, son and heir of a wealthy English aristocrat, disappears after a South American shipwreck. Some years later his erudite Afro-English valet, Bogle, is sent to investigate rumors that Tichborne survived and settled in Australia. An alcoholic ruffian answers Bogle's inquiries, claiming to be the lost heir. Bogle suspects fraud, but conspires with the claimant to split the inheritance should the latter successfully pass himself off to friends, family and the courts. As the claimant returns to England to continue his charade, enough people confirm his identity to make both the claimant and Bogle believe that he just might be the rightful heir after all.

== Cast ==
- Robert Pugh as The Claimant
- John Kani as Bogle
- Stephen Fry as Hawkins
- John Gielgud as Cockburn
- Robert Hardy as Lord Rivers
- Charles Gray as Arundell
- James Villiers as Uncle Henry
- Dudley Sutton as Onslow
- Perry Fenwick as John Holmes
- Christopher Benjamin as Gibbes
- Roger Hammond as Cubitt
- John Challis as Rous the Landlord
- Anita Dobson as Fanny Loder
- Ursula Howells as Lady Doughty
- Jennifer Hennessy as Cousin Alicia
