= The Way We Live Now (2001 TV serial) =

- U.S. DVD cover
- Based on: The Way We Live Now by Anthony Trollope
- Written by: Andrew Davies (adaptation)
- Directed by: David Yates
- Starring: David Suchet; Matthew Macfadyen; Shirley Henderson; Cillian Murphy
- Composer: Nicholas Hooper
- Country of origin: United Kingdom
- Original language: English
- No. of series: 1
- No. of episodes: 4

Production
- Executive producers: Rebecca Eaton; Pippa Harris; Jane Tranter
- Producer: Nigel Stafford-Clark
- Cinematography: Chris Seager
- Editor: Mark Day
- Production company: WGBH productions for BBC

Original release
- Network: BBC One
- Release: 11 November – 2 December 2001

The Way We Live Now is a 2001 six-part television adaptation of the Anthony Trollope 1875 novel The Way We Live Now. The serial was first broadcast on the BBC and was directed by David Yates, written by Andrew Davies and produced by Nigel Stafford-Clark. David Suchet starred as Augustus Melmotte, with Shirley Henderson as his daughter Marie, Matthew Macfadyen as Sir Felix Carbury, Cillian Murphy as Paul Montague and Miranda Otto as Mrs Hurtle.

== Plot summary ==
Augustus Melmotte, a financier with a mysterious past, moves to London with his family. Rumours about him are rife in society.

Lady Carbury is an impoverished widow with a handsome but dissolute son, Sir Felix, and a pretty, intelligent daughter, Henrietta. Sir Felix has gambled away his inheritance and his mother supports them by writing. Her friend, Mr Broune, a publisher, reviews her books favourably and wants their relationship to be closer.

Felix hears that Melmotte's daughter, Marie, will have a huge dowry. He decides to retrieve the family's fortunes by marrying Marie. The Carburys are invited to a ball at Melmotte's mansion; Felix meets Marie, an inexperienced young woman, and sweeps her off her feet.

Roger, the Carburys' cousin, is a country squire. He has loved Henrietta for years but said nothing, as she has only recently come of age. Paul Montague is a young engineer, formerly Roger's ward. Newly returned from America with plans to build a railroad from Utah to Mexico, Paul meets Henrietta when the Carburys visit Roger's estate. On this visit Felix continues his affair with a country girl, Ruby. Roger later proposes to Henrietta, who turns him down. Roger refuses to give up, but Paul discloses later that he too is interested in Henrietta.

Paul and his American partner meet Melmotte, who agrees to arrange a stock offering for the railroad. Sir Felix and some of his friends join the board of directors; none cares anything about the company, but they are delighted at the chance to profit from it. The stock offering is a huge success. Melmotte begins to be accepted by some in society. Paul wants to go to America to begin construction, but Melmotte puts off financial commitments.

Paul learns that Mrs Hurtle, whom he was engaged to in America, is in London. She vanished before their marriage and he assumed that she had jilted him. She tells him that she means to enforce his promise of marriage. Paul leaves for Mexico.

Felix continues to woo Marie and approaches Melmotte, who says Felix has no money. Marie convinces Felix to elope, confident that her father will eventually support them financially. To pay for the trip to America, she steals a cheque from Melmotte. Felix fails to join her in Liverpool, where Marie is stopped by police investigating the stolen cheque. She has to return to Melmotte's house. Marie is visited by Henrietta, who says that Felix does not have the courage to defy Melmotte and has no interest in marrying Marie without a dowry. Marie's feelings for Felix change to hatred.

Melmotte is elected to Parliament. On the strength of the successful stock offering, he has borrowed huge sums of money for other ambitious projects. Paul returns to London, because no work has started on the railroad. Melmotte warns that if this is revealed, Paul and everyone who has invested in the railroad will be ruined. Paul, unwilling to be involved in a fraud, reveals everything to Mr Alf, who publishes it in his newspaper. The railroad's stock begins to plunge. Paul and Henrietta become engaged.

Felix has continued his affair with Ruby after she comes to London. When Henrietta reproaches him for abandoning Marie, he tells her about Mrs Hurtle, whom Henrietta visits. Mrs Hurtle makes Henrietta believe that her affair is still going on. Henrietta tells Paul they cannot see each other again.

The precipitous fall of the railroad stock causes Melmotte's fortunes to sink as creditors begin pressing for repayment. He asks Marie to release a large sum he put in her name to protect it from his creditors, but she refuses. Melmotte commits suicide. Marie is still wealthy thanks to that money.

Lady Carbury is now penniless. Mr Broune proposes to her and she accepts. He persuades her to send Sir Felix abroad.

Mrs Hurtle, accepting that Paul will never marry her, tells Henrietta that she was lying when she implied that she and Paul had slept together in England, and leaves for America. Paul and Henrietta marry and go to America. Other characters affected by Melmotte's chicanery face their future.

== Awards ==
At the 2002 BAFTA Awards, director David Yates and producer Nigel Stafford-Clark collected an award for The Way We Live Now, which won Best Drama Serial. Suchet was nominated as Best Actor. At the 2002 Royal Television Society Programme Awards, Suchet won Actor: Male while Shirley Henderson was nominated for Actor: Female and writer Andrew Davies was nominated for Best Writing. The same year, at the Royal Television Society Craft & Design Awards, the series received four nominations: Costume Design - Drama, Make-Up Design - Drama, Sound - Drama and Tape and Film Editing - Drama.

== Cast ==
- David Suchet: Augustus Melmotte
- Tony Pritchard: Mr Wakeham
- Paloma Baeza: Hetta Carbury
- Cheryl Campbell: Lady Carbury
- Cillian Murphy: Paul Montague
- Miranda Otto: Mrs Hurtle
- Allan Corduner: Croll
- Tony Britton: Lord Alfred Grendall
- Angus Wright: Miles Grendall
- Richard Cant: Dolly Longestaffe
- Stuart McQuarrie: Lord Nidderdale
- Robert Sterne: Portrait Painter
- Tom Fahy: Butler - Grosvenor Square
- Matthew Macfadyen: Sir Felix Carbury
- Lilo Baur: Didon (Marie's maid)
- Shirley Henderson: Marie Melmotte
- Anne-Marie Duff: Georgiana Longestaffe
- Oliver Ford Davies: Mr Longestaffe
- Joanna David: Lady Pomona Longestaffe
- Maxine Peake: Ruby Ruggles
- Trevor Peacock: Mr Ruggles
- Nicholas McGaughey: John Crumb
- Jon Rumney: Herr Vossner
- Helen Schlesinger: Madame Melmotte
- Dudley Sutton: Speaker of the House of Commons
- Graham Crowden: The Marquis of Auld Reekie
- Douglas Hodge: Roger Carbury
- David Bradley: Mr Broune
- Fenella Woolgar: Lady Julia Monogram
- Jim Carter: Mr Brehgert
- James Duke: Bank Official
- Rob Brydon: Mr Alf
- Michael Riley: Hamilton K. Fisker
- Derek Smee: Butler - Caversham Hall
- Michele Dotrice: Mrs Pipkin
- Sarah Niven: Simpson
