= Siân Rees =

English author and historian

- Born: Cornwall, England
- Education: University of Oxford
- Occupations: author and historian
- Known for: social and maritime history of the 17th and 18th centuries

Siân Rees is an English author and historian. She was born in Cornwall, has a degree in history from University of Oxford and lives in Brighton. She is particularly interested in the social and maritime history of the 17th and 18th centuries. Her first book, about the transportation of female convicts to Australia at the end of the 18th century, was made into a Timewatch documentary and has been optioned as a feature film. The second, a biography of Eliza Lynch, led to her involvement in the Argentine documentary Candido Lopez: Los Campos de Batalla, directed by José Luis García.

Her books have been published in over fifteen countries and she is represented by the London literary agent Andrew Lownie.

== Bibliography ==
- The Floating Brothel: The Extraordinary Story of the Lady Julian and its Cargo of Female Convicts Bound for Botany Bay, Hodder (2001), ISBN 0-7336-1304-7
- The Shadows of Elisa Lynch: How a Nineteenth-century Irish Courtesan Became the Most Powerful Woman in Paraguay, Headline (2003) ISBN 0-7553-1115-9
- The Ship Thieves: The True Tale of James Porter, Colonial Pirate, Aurum (2006) ISBN 1-84513-218-1
- Sweet Water and Bitter: the Ships that Stopped the Slave Trade, New Hampshire (2011) ISBN 1-58465-980-7
- Moll: The Life and Times of Moll Flanders, Chatto & Windus (2011) ISBN 0-7011-8507-4
