= Moving Pictures (TV series) =

1990 British television series

Moving Pictures is a television series devoted to film that aired on BBC 2 from 29 September 1990 to 11 June 1996. Its first series was presented by Kate Leys, with American-born Howard Schuman, screenwriter of Rock Follies and Selling Hitler, taking over from the second series.

Each program was composed of several short films on different cinematic subjects and not necessarily on current releases. Although it never achieved high ratings, Moving Pictures was frequently used to teach film studies. Interviewed on the set of Pulp Fiction, Quentin Tarantino told John Travolta it was the best show about movies on television. Director Mike Figgis credited a film about himself with salvaging his career after it showed the other side of the story of the making of his film Mr. Jones.

The series finished in 1996, largely due to the cost of paying for film clips, but excerpts from it have since appeared as supplementary material on The Criterion Collection editions of Chungking Express (1994) and Straw Dogs (1971) include Moving Pictures documentaries on Wong Kar-Wai and Sam Peckinpah respectively. Other DVD and Blu-ray releases featuring the series include The Night of the Hunter (1955), Blue Velvet (1986) and Short Cuts (1993).
