= Nigel Stafford-Clark =

British film and television producer (born 1948)

- Born: 12 June 1948 (age 78); Bromley, Kent, England
- Occupations: Film and television producer
- Years active: 1982–2018

Nigel Stafford-Clark (born 12 June 1948) is a British film and television producer, a three-time BAFTA winner and the owner of Deep Indigo Productions. He is best known as the producer of Warriors, The Way We Live Now, Bleak House, and The Passion, which were broadcast by the BBC.

== Early life and education ==
The son of distinguished psychiatrist David Stafford-Clark and brother of theatre director Max Stafford-Clark, Nigel was educated at Felsted and Trinity College, Cambridge.

== Career ==
He worked in advertising and in sponsored documentaries before becoming a commercial producer at Moving Picture Company (MPC).

In the buildup to the launch of Channel 4 in November 1982, he formed MPC's programme department, and executive-produced a number of documentary series for the new channel, including one of its earliest hits Tom Keating on Painters. He also produced several television films for the Film on Four strand, including Last Day of Summer, written by Ian McEwan from his own short story, and The House, the debut drama from writer-director and People Show alumnus Mike Figgis. He moved on to feature films in the mid-80s, including The Assam Garden, in which Deborah Kerr gave a highly acclaimed performance in what would be her last feature, and Stormy Monday, starring Melanie Griffith, Tommy Lee Jones, Sting and Sean Bean, in which Mike Figgis made an immediate impact as writer and director of his first.

In 1988, Stafford-Clark moved to Zenith Productions, the independent drama production company whose feature film credits included Prick Up Your Ears, Wish You Were Here, Sid and Nancy and The Hit, and whose television productions included Inspector Morse and Hamish Macbeth. During his time there, he produced a number of television and feature films, amongst them the highly controversial and award-winning Shoot to Kill (1990), the drama debut of documentary film-maker Peter Kosminsky, which told the story of the Stalker Inquiry in Northern Ireland.

In 1998 Stafford-Clark left Zenith to form his own production company, Deep Indigo, winning the BAFTA for Best Drama Serial three times between 1999 and 2005 with productions for the BBC. Warriors (1999), written by Leigh Jackson, reunited him with director Peter Kosminsky and dealt with the brutal realities facing young British soldiers on peacekeeping duties in Bosnia. The Way We Live Now (2001), the first of three projects with writer Andrew Davies, was directed by David Yates and starred David Suchet as Anthony Trollope's rogue Augustus Melmotte. This was followed by a second Trollope adaptation He Knew He Was Right (2003) directed by Tom Vaughan, and then by Bleak House (2005). Requested by the BBC to refresh the classic serial, Stafford-Clark devised both a format and a shooting style that broke with convention, with sixteen half-hour episodes shown twice weekly to reflect the episodic publication of Charles Dickens' epic novel. It was directed by Justin Chadwick and Susanna White, with Gillian Anderson, Charles Dance, Anna Maxwell Martin and Carey Mulligan leading a cast of over 65, and was greeted with acclaim by critics and audiences alike. It is ranked in the top 15 of Metacritic's Best TV Shows of All Time, with an aggregate critics' score of 93/100 which remains the highest for any British drama.

In March 2008, Stafford-Clark's production The Passion was broadcast on BBC One. It told the story of Jesus from his entry into Jerusalem on Palm Sunday to his Crucifixion and the events which followed, placing it firmly and vividly in the context of the world in which it took place. Written by Frank Deasy and directed by Michael Offer, it was stripped across Holy Week in four peak-time episodes.

Stafford-Clark next produced Titanic, a four-hour serial for ITV in the UK written by Julian Fellowes, that took a fresh look at the sinking of the Titanic for the one hundredth anniversary in April 2012. Filming ended in mid-July 2011 at the Stern Studios in Budapest. The UK/Hungary/Canada co-production was sold to 160 countries, including the ABC Network in the US, TF1 in France and ZDF in Germany, and won the 2013 TV BAFTA for Best Visual Effects. His most recent production is Press, a six part drama series for BBC One and PBS Masterpiece Theatre, written by Mike Bartlett (Dr Foster, King Charles III) and directed by Tom Vaughan.

== Accolades ==
In addition to the BAFTAs, his productions have received three Best Drama awards from the Royal Television Society and four from the Broadcasting Press Guild, as well as several Emmys and the prestigious Peabody Award in the US.

He is a fellow of the Royal Society of Arts.
