= Directors Guild of Great Britain =

The Directors Guild of Great Britain (DGGB) was a professional organization that represented directors across all media, including film, television, theatre, radio, opera, commercials, music videos, corporate film/video and training, documentaries, multimedia and "new technology". It had evolved to become an independent trade union and a non-profit limited company, asset-linked to the Directors Guild Trust, the charity arm of the Guild. The Guild closed in 2015 and ceased operations in March 2017. The Directors Charitable Foundation continues the charity work of the Guild.

== Foundation ==
The DGGB was founded in 1983 by a group of leading British directors who were dissatisfied by poor representation by technical trade unions. The first meeting was at Ronnie Scott's Jazz Club in London, where they agreed directors needed an independent voice and that directors would be best represented by their own organization.

== Purpose ==
The DGGB continued to be instrumental in working to improve directors’ terms, conditions, and remuneration. In 1987, they established The Directors & Producers Rights Society (DPRS) and initiated the TV directors’ rights strike in 2000, creating an industry-wide alliance of the Guild, BECTU and the DPRS, which had brought about new residual block payment agreements with the main UK TV broadcasters and production companies and an industry-wide Directors Forum and has generated contract advice guides and a "code of practice" guideline for directors in television drama and non-fiction programming. Through specific motion picture, television, theatre, and radio groups, the Guild had produced model contracts, guides and provides advice across all live and recorded media. In 2008 the DPRS became the Directors UK, now the foremost industrial negotiating body for British recorded media directors.

Guild members had an interest in the broad nature of the directing profession and reflected this diversity in the nature of its members and in their training events. The Guild had championed understanding and respect for the work of directors both within their own industry and throughout the public at large. It sponsored workshops, master classes, seminars, one-on-one mentoring, as well as conducting screenings, gala events and presenting periodic "lifetime achievement awards" to recognize outstanding British directors.

The Guild was based in central London.

== Guild member categories ==
Guild member categories were Professional (who have credits for at least two professional productions as the primary director), or Associate (supporting members who do not have their two professional credits, those working in the industry or those with a professional or academic interest in the craft of directing), who hail from the United Kingdom, as well as directors from a few other countries who support the goals of the Guild, many of whom are influenced or inspired by the British directing aesthetic or style.

== Lifetime Achievement Awards ==
Over its 25 years, the Guild had staged ten Lifetime Achievement Awards honouring individual directors, as well as two large-scale Guild Award ceremonies to honour outstanding directors in a variety of categories.

Those awards were presented to the following:

- 1993 Fred Zinnemann
- 1994 Roy Boulting
- 1995 Joan Littlewood
- 1996 Christopher Morahan
- 1997 Sir Richard Eyre
- 1998 Alan Parker
- 1999 Stanley Kubrick
- 2001 Peter Brook
- 2002 John Schlesinger
- 2003 Sir Trevor Nunn
- 2005 Sam Mendes

== Blue plaques ==
The Directors Guild Trust was the charity arm of the Guild supporting both Guild activities and the wider remit of promoting British directors' art and craft to a national and international public, through education, events, commemorations, and memorials.

The Trust has erected blue plaque memorials to:

- 2005 Michael Powell
- 2006 Alexander Mackendrick
- 2008 David Lean
- 2011 Brian Desmond Hurst
- 2013 John Schlesinger
- 2013 Joan Littlewood
