= Robbie McCallum =

British writer

Robbie McCallum (born 26 August 1967) is a Scottish screenwriter and novelist whose stories mix comedy, drama, social realism, and strong characters with a driving narrative. He has won numerous Awards for creative writing and was nominated for a BAFTA for his filmscript Rank. His debut novel I'll Be Your Dog, a comedy set in New Orleans, was released in 2010 and made the Amazon Top 10 Comedy List.

== Biography ==
McCallum was born in Govanhill, Glasgow. When he was 10 in the late 1970s, his family moved to England in search of work. He left school at 15 and joined the railway as an apprentice electrician. He subsequently attended the University of Nottingham, Universite D'Orsay and the London College of Printing. McCallum is married to the film Production Designer, Sue Ferguson. They have two children and live in Brighton (UK) and Mindelo, São Vicente (Cabo Verde).

== Work ==
=== Screenplays ===
- Sixty Cups of Coffee, 2000, short film
- Life By the Drop, 2002, short film
- Rank, 2003, short film
- The Fall of Shug McCracken, 2005, short film
- Hips, Lips and Fingertips, 2007, feature film
- The Road to Marfa Lights, 2008, feature film
- The Green Room, 2009, feature film
- Saviour, 2010, feature film
- The Brighton Send Off, 2014, feature film
- Atlantic Heart, 2014, feature film
- Bulldog Breed, 2017, feature film

=== Novels ===
- I'll Be Your Dog, 2010
- Smiling Out Loud, 2011

=== Directing ===
- Franco's Famous Cheekball, 2014, Short Film
- Monkfish, 2014, Short Film
- Brighton Is Falling, 2016, Music Video
- Atlantic Heart, 2016, Feature Film
- The Black Black, 2017, Short Film

== Awards ==
- In 2002, McCallum was a BBC Talent finalist for his film Sixty Cups of Coffee
- In 2003, Life By The Drop won the Audience Award at the Dallas International Film Festival
- In 2003, Rank won the London Production Award, was and was subsequently nominated for a BAFTA
- In 2005, The Fall of Shug McCracken was Awarded Production Funding from Scottish Screen. The film was produced in Glasgow and Texas, USA and went on to win the Best Comedy Award at the Santa Monica Film Festival
- In 2008, The Road to Marfa Lights was Awarded Development funding from Scottish Screen
